= Benjamin Frederik Matthes =

Dutch linguist, Buginese and Makassarese language expert and missionary

Reverend Benjamin Frederik Matthes
- J.P. Berghaus: Dutch missionary and linguist Benjamin Frederik Matthes (1818–1908), 1848. Lithography.
- Born: Benjamin Frederik Matthes; 16 January 1818; Amsterdam, Netherlands
- Died: 9 October 1908 (aged 90); Nijmegen, Netherlands
- Occupations: protestant missionary, linguist, translator, author
- Spouse(s): Everharda Catharina Engelenburg (Deventer, 1821 – Maros, South Sulawesi, Indonesia, 9 March 1855)
- Children: 2
- Writing career
- Notable work: Boeginesche chrestomathie (1872, includes a section from the Buginese epic La Galigo)
- Notable awards: Honorary doctorate in linguistics and literature of the Malay Archipelago, Leiden University 1881

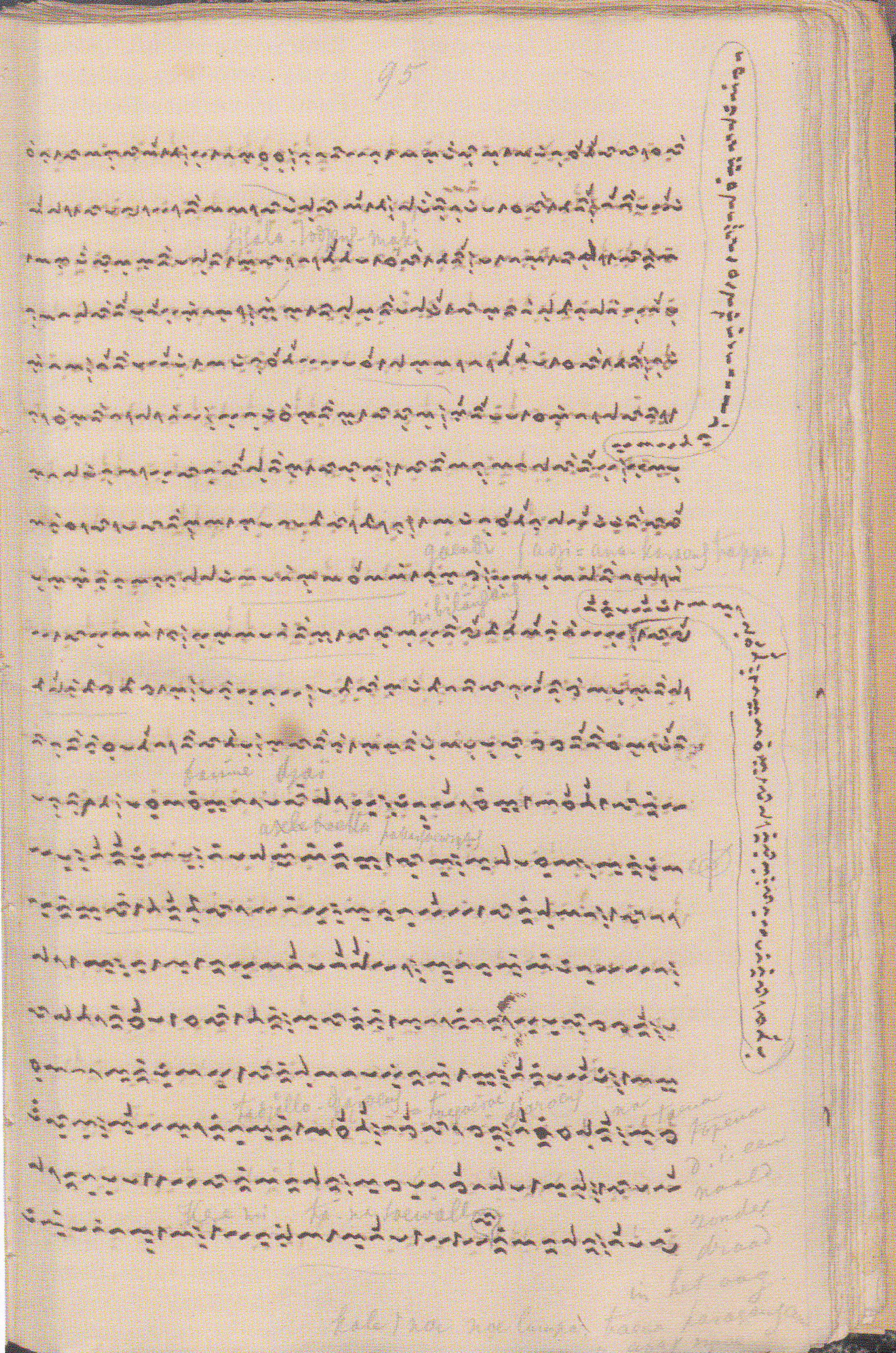
Page in Buginese script, with pencil additions by Benjamin Matthes in preparation of his Boegineesch-Hollandsch Woordenboek (Buginese-Dutch dictionary, 1874).

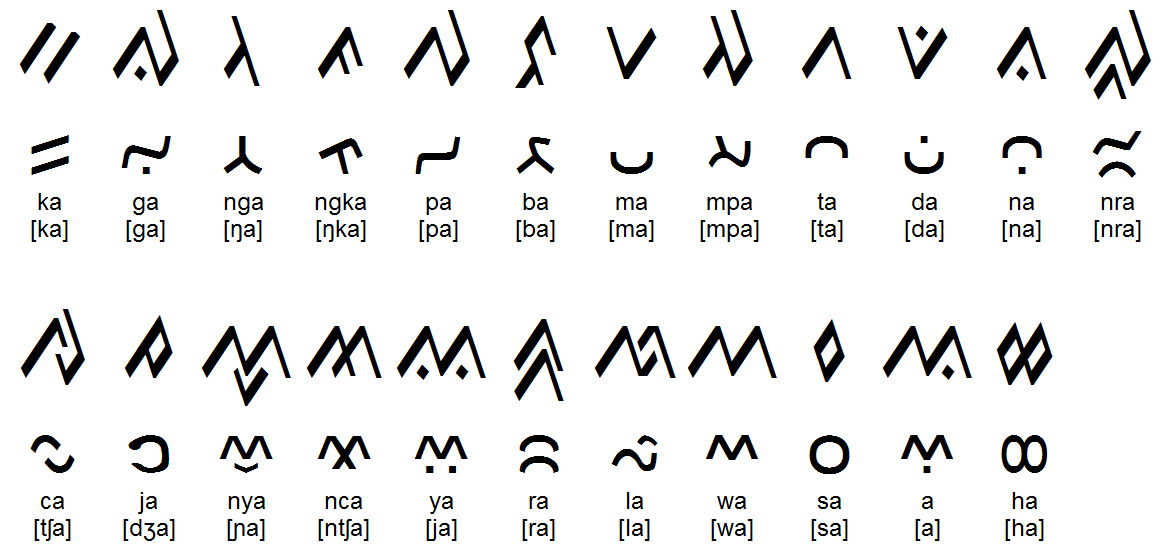
Buginese characters for consonants.

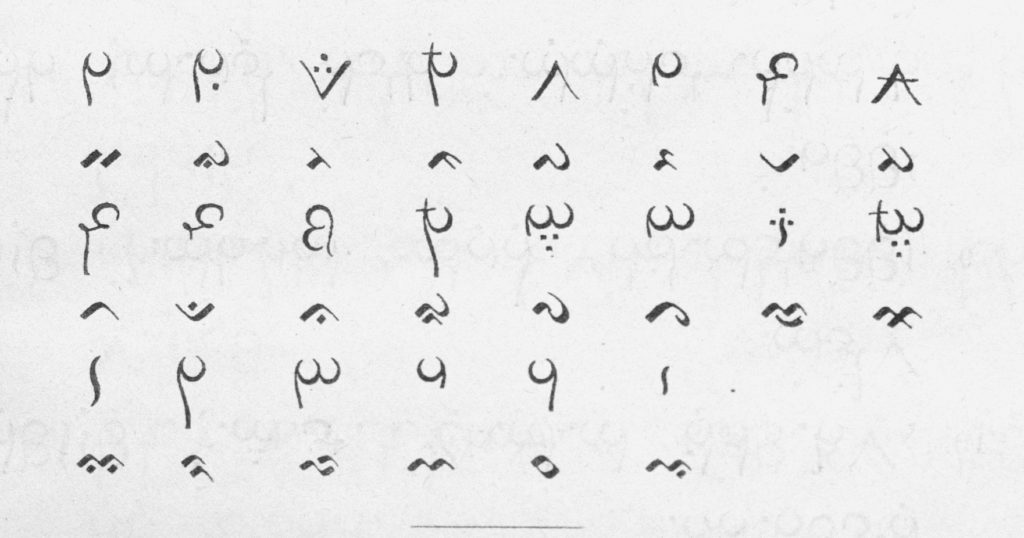
Buginese cypher script characters (odd rows) with their equivalents in standard Buginese Lontara script (even rows) by B. F. Matthes in his bookEenige proeven van Boegineesche en Makassaarsche Poëzie (Some samples of Buginese and Maskassarese poetry), 1883.

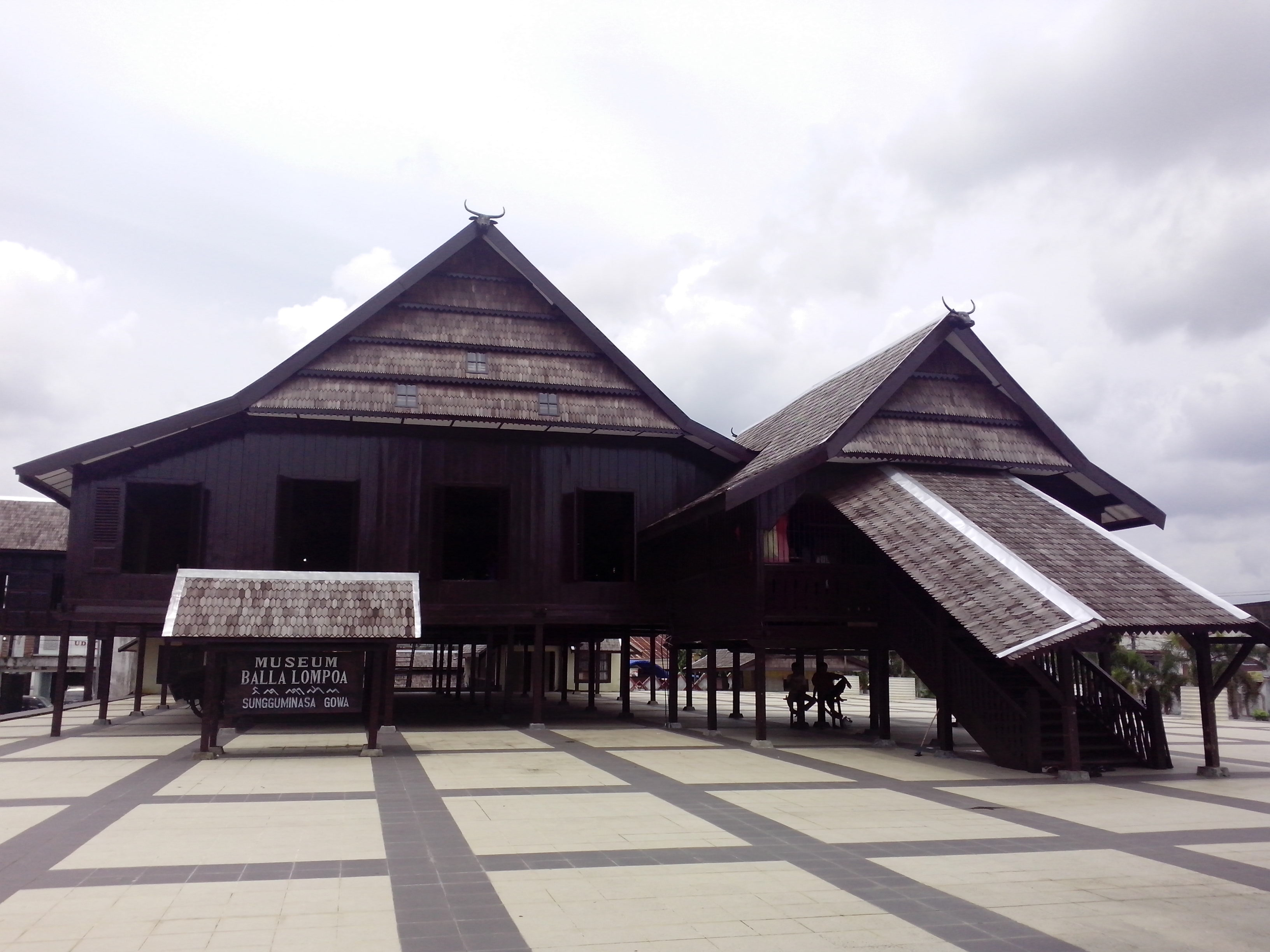
1936 Reconstruction of the Goa (Gowa) royal palace. Museum Balla Lompoa, Sungguminasa near Makassar, 2014.

Benjamin Frederik Matthes (16 January 1818 – 9 October 1908) was a Dutch Protestant missionary in Dutch East Indies (Indonesia), linguist, especially of Buginese, author and Bible translator.

== Biography ==
Matthes was born the son of a Lutheran clergyman, and studied theology and literature at Leiden (1835–1838) and theology (1836–1841) at the Luthersch Seminarium at Amsterdam, as well as Semitic languages at Leiden and Heidelberg (1841–1844). Not being an outgoing preacher, Matthes preferred to study and teach. In the years 1844–1848 he worked as second lecturer and vice director of the Zendelingshuis (missionary college) of the Nederlands Zendelinggenootschap (NZG, Protestant Netherlands Missionary Society) at Rotterdam. With Leiden professor Theodor Juynboll he curated a 1852 edition of a history of Egypt in Arabic written by Abū al-Maḥāsin Yūsuf ibn Taghrī-Birdī. At the Zendelingshuis he taught Malay language and published a Malay linguistic textbook.

=== First period at South Sulawesi, 1848–1858 ===
In 1848 the Dutch Bible Society appointed him as a linguist to study the Makassarese and Buginese languages of South-West Sulawesi, and create grammar text books with a view to later publish Bible translations for both languages. After his marriage in July 1848 he duly arrived at his posting in Makassar in October 1848. There he could learn Makassarese from native speakers, however Buginese could only be acquired in the hinterland.

So in 1852, Matthes toured Bugis regions such as Maros, Pangkajene, and Tanete where he met Colliq Pujie (1812–1876). One of her titles was Arung Pancana, as she was a daughter of La Rumpang Megga, ruler of the Kingdom of Tanette (reigned 1840–1855) and mother of the later Queen of Tanette Siti Aisyah We Tenriolle (reigned 1855–1910). Colliq Pujie was a widow of about 40 years old and a truly educated woman, who usually composed all the official letters for her father, and who not only had a thorough understanding of the courtly language of Bone, but did not seem to be unfamiliar even with the ancient La-Galigo language, which has now fallen completely into disuse. Matthes had been tasked to learn the Buginese language, which he found more difficult to master than the Makassarese. This led to a collaboration with Colliq Pujié. Matthes collected manuscripts of the epic I La Galigo in South Sulawesi that Colliq Pujié transliterated, edited and copied into 12 volumes of the manuscript I La Galigo.

On Matthes' trip in July–August 1857 searching for the purest form of the Buginese language, he was refused entry into the Kingdom of Bone.

=== First leave to the Netherlands, 1858–1861 ===
In February 1858 he departed from Makassar for his first leave to Holland, where he arranged the printing of several of his manuscripts on the Makassarese language: a grammar, a dictionary and a study anthology (chrestomathy). In 1859, e.g., his Makassarese dictionary was published, which remained current until Cense's new dictionary of 1979.

=== Second period at South Sulawesi, 1861–1870 ===
In 1861 he returned to Makassar, and found that the Dutch Governor now was opposed the Christian evangelizing in South Sulawesi. Matthes decided to continue his study of the Bugi language but also to restrict his upcoming Bugi Bible translation to the Gospel of Matthew. After the Second Bone War by the Dutch colonial army in 1860 a research visit to the Bone Kingdom had become feasible, so that Matthes could find his first manuscript in cipher writing. Furthermore, he continued collecting parts of larger manuscripts, especially those of the extensive La Galigo cycle. The learned princess Colliq Pujié of Tanette was of great help with her deep expertise of the old Bugi language and copied and edited available parts of La Galigo, to the tune of some 2848 folio pages, now curated by Leiden University Library.

=== Second leave to the Netherlands, 1870–1875 ===
During this leave to the Netherlands Matthes curated the publication of several of his linguistic works, e.g., the second and third part of his Boegineesche Chrestomathie (Buginese Chrestomathy), Woordenboek (Dictionary, 1200 pages in two columns) and ditto Spraakkunst (Grammar) in 1875. He delivered a well-received lecture on the Sulawesi female and male bissu priests at the Royal Netherlands Academy of Arts and Sciences, which was published with extensive illustrations.

=== Teacher's college at Makassar, 1875–1879 ===
The Dutch government requested Matthes to set up a training college for indigenous teachers at Makassar (Dutch: Kweekschool voor inlandsche onderwijzers), which he subsequently successfully led as a director up to 1879. The college complex was established at Justitielaan (now Jalan Amanagappa) in Makassar. Matthes wrote several textbooks for this college.

=== Return to the Netherlands ===
Early 1880 Matthes returned to Holland, and continued his translations of the Bible into Makassarese and Buginese, which were completed in December 1900. He retired to Nijmegen where he died on 9 October 1908 at the age of 90. After his decease, his Makassarese and Buginese manuscripts were loaned to Leiden University Library.

== Quotation ==
Matthes on bissus and their special role in nineteenth-century Bugi Sulawesi society:

(Matthes' Dutch text)
Wat nu de werkzaamheden der bîssoe's betreft, zoo ziet men ze aan de hoven allerlei huiselijke bezigheden verrigten, zich bijvoorbeeld met het bereiden der spijzen en de bediening bemoeijen. Doch dit is natuurlijk meer bij wijze van tijdverdrijf. De taak der bîssoe's begint dan eigenlijk, wanneer er eenig feest is. Zoo onder anderen bij gelegenheid van geboorte, of als er een prinsje of prinsesje voor het eerst eet, of den grond betreedt. Zoo ook bij besnijdenis en tandenslijpen, bij trouwen, enz.
Doch deze en meer huiselijke feesten zijn bij den Inlander alle tevens van godsdienstigen aard. En de wijl de Boeginezen éénparig het Mohammedanisme omhelsd hebben, zijn de voorvaderlijke geheel heidensche begrippen der bîssoe's eigenlijk met hun geloof in strijd. De bîssoe's vervullen daarbij dan ook gewoonlijk geen' andere rol, dan die van te dansen en te zingen, tenzij zij, en dit is zeker ook nog al dikwerf het geval, als sânro's, d.i. dokters of dokteressen, optreden.

(Translation)
Now as for the duties of the bissus, they are seen carrying out all sorts of domestic chores at the courts, for example preparing dishes and serving meals. However, this is of course more like a pastime. The real job of a bissu commences when there is some celebration. Including for example, on the occasion of a birth, or when a princeling or little princess take their first bite or step. Likewise at circumcision, tooth sharpening and marriage, and so forth.
But these and other indigenous domestic indigenous celebrations are all also of a religious nature. And while the Buginese unanimously have embraced Mohammedanism, the ancestral wholly pagan concepts of the bissus are in fact at odds with their faith. The bissus mostly play no other role than that of dancers and singers, unless they act as sânros, i.e., male or female (indigenous) doctors, which surely is quite often the case.

== Works ==
Matthes' publications include:

- Egeling, Lucas; Matthes, B.F. (1846). Babrapa perkara akan segala soerat Perdjandjian Bahroe [Some matters concerning all the documents of the New Testament] (in Malay). Rotterdam: Wajt. OCLC 46392823. 185 pages.
- Ibn Taġrībardī, Yūsuf (1851–1861). Juynboll, Th. W. J.; Matthes, B.F. (eds.). al-Nuǧūm al-zāhira fī mulūk Miṣr wa-al-Qāhira (النجوم الزاهرة في ملوك مصر والقاهرة) [The bright stars of the kings of Egypt and Cairo (Abdoel Makassar iben Tagii Bardii Annales, Ibn Taghribirdi's Annals)] (in Arabic). Lugduni Batavorum (Leiden): Brill. OCLC 900790915. Two volumes, with scan of tome 2, part 1, at archive.org, consulted on 10 September 2026.
- Abdoe-r-Rasjied; B. F. Matthes (1858). Boegineesch heldendicht op Daeng Kalaboe : waarin onder andere de dood van den ambtenaar T. Baron Collot d'Escury en de zegepraal der Hollandsche wapenen bezongen worden [Buginese epic poem on Daenc Kalaboe, including the death of the civil servant T. Baron Collot d'Escury and the triumph of the Dutch arms] (in Dutch). Makassar: Muller, Schmidt. OCLC 56378745. 43 pages.
- Matthes, B.F. (1858). Makassaarsche spraakkunst [Makassarese grammar] (in Makassarese and Dutch). Amsterdam: Nederlandsch Bijbelgenootschap; Frederik Muller. OCLC 905555315. XVI + 135 pages.
- Matthes, B.F. (1859). Makassaarsch-Hollandsch Woordenboek met Hollandsch-Makassaarsche Woordenlijst, opgave van Makassaarsche Plantennamen en verklaring van een tot opheldering bijgevoegden ethnographischen atlas [Makassarese-Dutch Dictionary with a Dutch-Makassarese Glossary, a list of Makassarese plant names, and an explanation of the ethnographic atlas included for clarification] (in Makassarese and Dutch). Amsterdam: F. Muller. OCLC 162910006. VIII + 943 pages.
- Matthes, B.F. (1862). Bugineesch heldendicht op den eersten Bonische veldtogt van 1859, voor het eerst uitgegeven en vertaald, alsmede van aanteekeningen en beknopte historische inleiding voorzien [Buginese epic poem on the first campaign to Bone, published and translated for the first time, with notes and a brief historical introduction] (in Buginese and Dutch). Makassar: W. Eekhout & Co. OCLC 993431499.
- Matthes, B. F. (1864–1872). Boeginesche chrestomathie [Buginese chrestomathy] (in Buginese and Dutch). Amsterdam: Nederlandsch Bijbelgenootschap ; Nederlandsch Gouvernement. OCLC 69148764. 3 volumes. Vol. 1 published on behalf of the Dutch Bible Society, Amsterdam, periodical Bijbelmagazijn, and printed in Makassar by K. Sutherland. Vols. 2 and 3 published on behalf of the Dutch Government, and printed in Amsterdam by C.A. Spin & Sons. With a second title page in Buginese: Yinae surĕq Wugi sakkĕ-rupa. Includes a fragment of the La Galigo epic. 1872a:416-547; 1872b:250-284.
- Matthes, B. F. (1865). "Verslag van een uitstapje naar de Ooster-Distrikten van Celebes, alsmede van verschillende togten in die Afdeeling ondernomen, van 25 September tot 22 December 1864" [Report of a little trip to the Eastern Districts of Celebes, as well as of various expeditions undertaken in that region, from 25 September to 22 December 1864]. Jaarboekje Celebes 1865 [Celebes Yearbooklet 1865]. Makassar: K. Sutherland. pp. 113–199.
- Matthes, Benjamin F. (1872). Boeginesche Chrestomathie, door B. F. Matthes: Uitgegeven voor rekening van het Nederlandsch gouvernement [Buginese Chrestomathy, by B. F. Matthes: Publication paid by the Dutch government] (in Buginese and Dutch). C. A. Spin & Zoon. OCLC 1391886070.
- Matthes, Benjamin F. (1872). Aanteekeningen op de Boeginesche Chrestomathie, Afgevaardigde van het Nederlandsh Bijbelgenootschap op Celebes, uitgegeven voor rekening van het Nederlandsch Gouvernement [Notes on the Buginese chrestomathy] (in Dutch). Amsterdam: C.A. Spin & Zoon. pp. 250–262. OCLC 974095050. Two volumes.
- Matthes, B.F. (1872). Over de bissoe's of heidensche priesters en priesteressen der Boeginezen [On the Bissu or Buginese pagan priests and priestesses]. Verhandelingen der Koninklijke Nederlandse Akademie van Wetenschappen (in Dutch). Vol. 7. Amsterdam: Van der Post. OCLC 781851723. 50 pages + 4 plates.
- Matthes, B.F. (1874). Boegineesch-Hollandsch woordenboek: met Hollandsch-Boeginesche woordenlijst, en verklaring van een tot opheldering bijgevoegden Ethnographischen atlas [Dutch-Buginese Dictionary: with a Dutch-Buginese glossary, and an explanatory note for the accompanying the Ethnographic Atlas] (in Buginese and Dutch). 's Gravenhage: M. Nijhoff. OCLC 781824953. VIII + 1180 pages. Also oclc=834938955.
- Matthes, B.F. (1875). Boeginesche spraakkunst [Buginese grammar] (in Buginese and Dutch). 's Gravenhage: M. Nijhoff. OCLC 905558156.
- Matthes, B.F. (1883). Makassaarsche chrestomathie : oorspronkelijke Makassaarsche geschriften, in proza en poëzy [Makassarese chrestomathy : original Makassarese writings, in prose and poetry] (in Makassarese and Dutch) (2nd ed.). 's Gravenhage: Nederlandsch Gouvernement; Martinus Nijhoff.
- Matthes, B.F. (1889). Supplement op het Boegineesch-Hollandsch woordenboek [Supplement to the Buginese-Dutch dictionary] (in Buginese and Dutch). 's Gravenhage: M. Nijhoff. OCLC 68755911.

== See also ==
- Bible translations into the languages of Indonesia and Malaysia
- Bible translations into Malay
- Christianity in Indonesia
- Christianity in Malaysia
- Makassarese language

== Secondary literature ==
- van den Brink, H. (1943). Dr. Benjamin Frederik Matthes : zijn leven en arbeid in dienst van het Nederlandsch Bijbelgenootschap [Dr. Benjamin Frederik Matthes: his life and work in the service of the Nederlandsch Bijbelgenootschap (Dutch Bible Society)] (in Dutch). Amsterdam: Nederlandsch Bijbelgenootschap. OCLC 781828041. 590 pages.
- Jonker, J.C.G. (1909). "Levensbericht van Benjamin Frederik Matthes" [Biography of Benjamin Frederik Matthes]. Jaarboek van de Maatschappij der Nederlandsche Letterkunde (in Dutch). DBNL.
- Kern, H. (1910). "Levensbericht van Benjamin Frederik Matthes" (PDF). Jaarboek van de Koninklijke Nederlandse Akademie van Wetenschappen (KNAW) (in Dutch). Amsterdam: 67–91. ISSN 0169-2038. OCLC 45834456.
- Swellengrebel, J.L. (1974). "VII. Makassaars en Boeginees" [VII. Makassarese and Buginese]. In Leijdekkers voetspoor. Anderhalve eeuw Bijbelvertaling en Taalkunde in de Indonesische talen I 1820-1900 [In Leijdekker's footsteps. One century and a half of Bible translation and linguistics in the Indonesian languages I 1820–1900] (PDF). Verhandelingen van het Koninklijk Instituut voor Land-, Taal en Volkenkunde (in Dutch). 's Gravenhage: Martinus Nijhoff. pp. 147–172.
