= Bible Society for the Netherlands and Flanders =

Non-denominational Bible society in the Netherlands

- Nederlands-Vlaams Bijbelgenootschap (NBG)
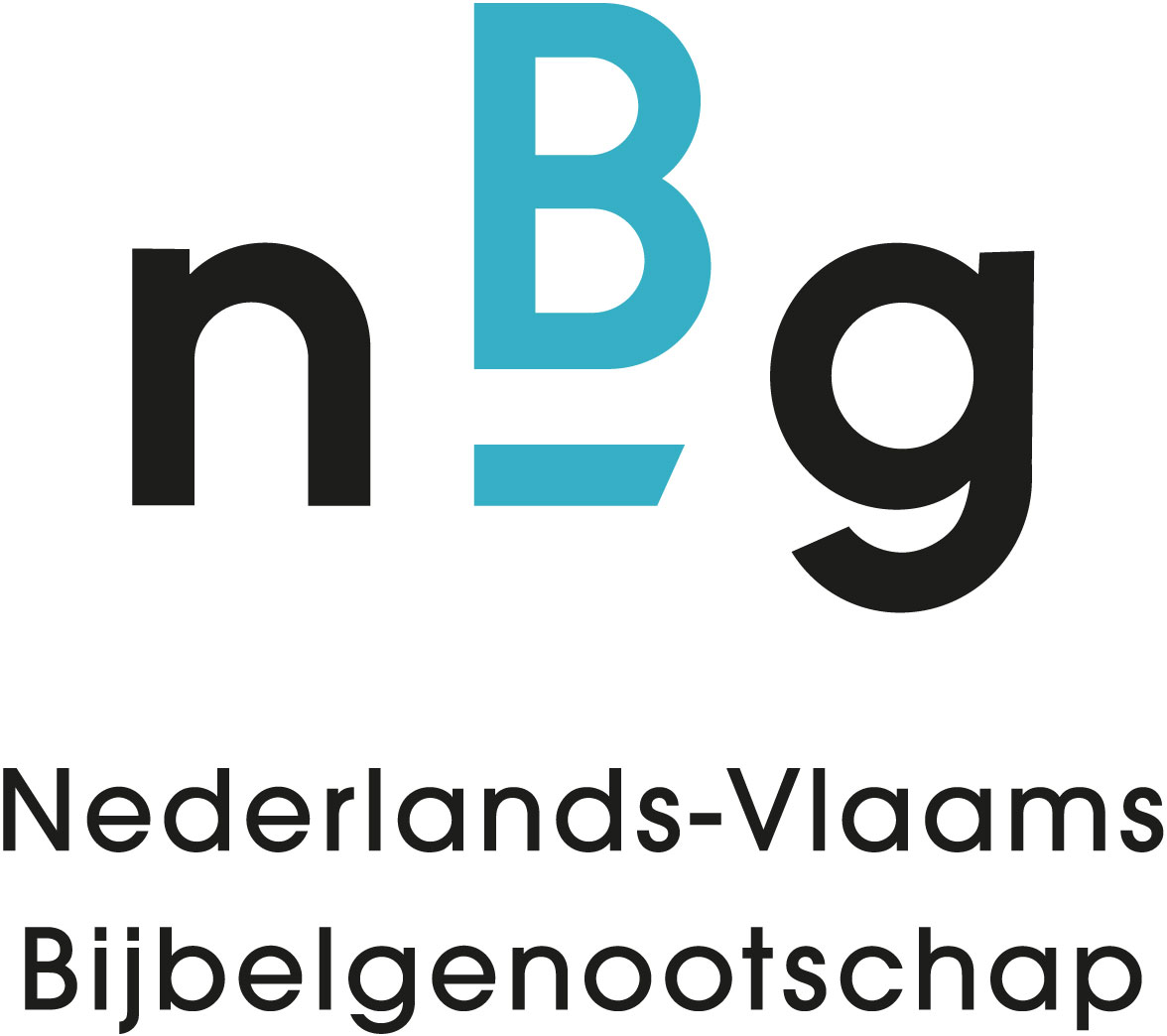
- Formation: 2021
- Purpose: Bible distribution, translation, advocacy, literacy, engagement, production
- Headquarters: Haarlem, Netherlands
- Region served: Netherlands
- Affiliations: United Bible Societies
- Website: bijbelgenootschap.nl

The Bible Society for the Netherlands and Flanders (Dutch: Nederlands-Vlaams Bijbelgenootschap, lit. 'Dutch-Flemish Bible Society'; NBG) is a non-denominational Bible society in the Netherlands and Flanders devoted to translating, publishing, and distributing the Bible at affordable costs. The society was formed from the fusion of the Dutch Bible Society (Nederlands Bijbelgenootschap; NBG) and the Flemish Bible Society (Vlaams Bijbelgenootschap) in 2021 and is currently based in Haarlem.

== History ==
After the establishment of the British and Foreign Bible Society (BFBS) in 1804, Bible societies were set up in many European countries to facilitate the affordable publishing and distribution of the Bible, particularly in the wake of the Napoleonic Wars. This was only possible in the Netherlands after the withdrawal of the French occupation army over the course of 1813 after eight years of French domination and direct occupation. Local Bible societies were set up in the various provinces of the Netherlands and they were united as the NBG on 29 June 1814 on the initiative of the BFBS. The mission of the NBG was deliberately limited to the distribution of Bibles and literature with the work of evangelism being left to other agencies.

The initial activities of the NBG was to purchase and redistribute Bibles or portions of the Bible affordably to the public. In November 1815, the NBG reported:

- Purchased 2,208 copies of the New Testament and the Bible
- Received 1,894 copies of the same
- Distributed 1,608 copies of the same to prisoners, Sunday Schools, and the poor

In 2021, the Dutch Bible Society agreed to fuse with the Flemish Bible Society to form the united Dutch-Flemish Bible Society.

=== Translation, publishing and distribution of the Dutch Bible ===
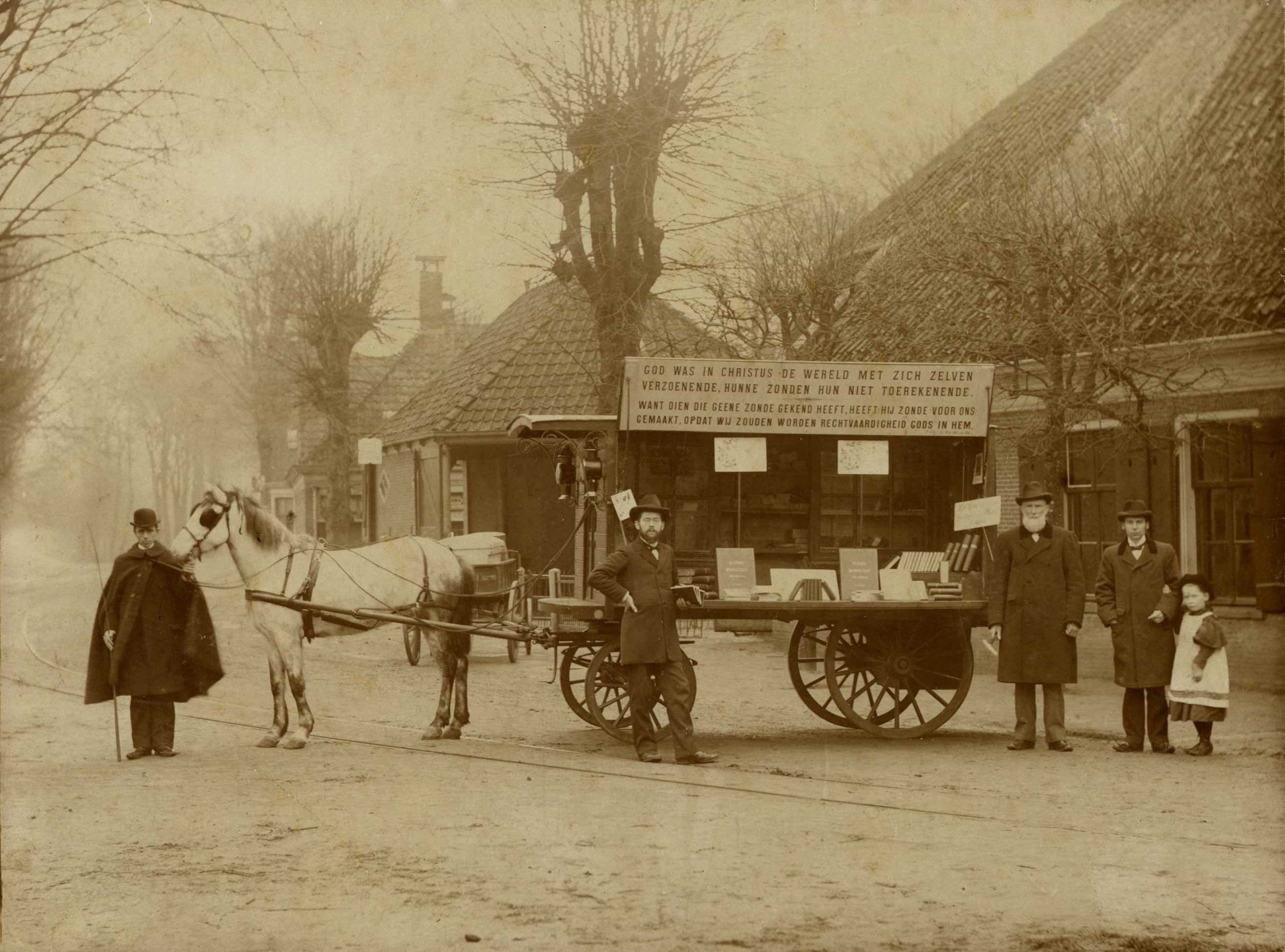
Bible Wagon of the Netherlands Bible Society in Heiloo, North Holland (1896)

In 1847, the NBG decided to take up the work of publishing the Bible themselves. The version that was primarily distributed in the Netherlands then was the 1637 Statenvertaling (transl. State Translation, also known as the Statenbijbel or State Bible).

The NBG appointed two colporteurs in 1890 specially for distribution in the countryside where the Bible was often difficult to obtain by laypeople. This was initially done by pushcart and later evolved into using horse-drawn carriages and trucks. These "Mobile Bible Houses" became a hallmark of the NBG's distribution programme until it was eventually discontinued in 2002.

==== NBG Translation ====
Over time the 17th century Statenvertaling had become less accessible to the general public due to the evolution and development of the Dutch language as well as the advances made in biblical scholarship. Earlier attempts in the 19th century to revised the Statenvertaling were not successful and in 1911 a group of scholars decided to embark on a new translation of the Bible in Dutch that would be translated from Greek manuscripts considered more reliable than the Textus Receptus while staying faithful to the idiomatic style of the Statenvertaling that the majority of Dutch Christians were familiar with.

In 1927, the NBG got involved in the project and eventually became the main sponsor and coordinator. Translators in the project were from the Protestant church in the Netherlands and represented the various theological streams within Protestantism. In 1939 the New Testament was completed and published and in 1951 the full Bible was published as the NBG Vertaling (transl. NBG Translation).

==== Great News For You ====
A new English translation of the New Testament using the principle of dynamic equivalence had been published in 1966 by the American Bible Society. Entitled Good New For Modern Man: The New Testament in Today's English Version, it was targeted at people who did not have English as their first language as well as people who had limited exposure to church.

As Dutch society rapidly secularised after the Second World War, many felt that a translation based on similar principles was needed. This resulted in the publishing of the Groot Nieuws voor U (transl. Great News For You) translation of the New Testament, primarily as a result of the work of A. W. G. Jaake.

==== Revised Statenvertaling ====
The NBG also commissioned a revised edition of the Statenvertaling by establishing a revision committee under Rev. C. A. Tukker. This revision was primarily a linguistic adaptation with modernised spelling used without any further substantial changes and was published in 1977 as the Statenvertaling 1977 (also known as the Tukkervertaling or Tukker Translation).

==== Great News Bible ====
After the Second World War, the NBG started collaborating with the Roman Catholic Katholieke Bijbelstichting (transl. Catholic Bible Foundation; KBS) to translate and produce a modern Dutch language ecumenical translation of the Bible.

Efforts remain stymied by various reasons and it was decided to first publish an ecumenical translation using vernacular Dutch. This took off from the 1972 Groot Nieuws voor U translation of the New Testament and by 1983, the full Bible including the Deuterocanonical books was published in 1983 as the Groot Nieuws Bijbel (transl. Great News Bible). This version was revised in 1996 to incorporate the latest scholarship as well as contemporary changes in Dutch spelling.

==== New Bible Translation ====
As a result of a 1989 meeting of the Consultative Council on the Bible, a decision was made to translate and publish a completely new ecumenical translation. In 1993, the translation work began with the NBG, and the Vlaams Bijbelgenootschap (transl. Flemish Bible Society) representing the Protestants while the KBS and the Vlaamse Bijbelstichting (transl. Flemish Bible Foundation) representing the Roman Catholics.

A complete formal ecumenical translation of the Bible was finally published in 2004 as the Nieuwe Bijbelvertaling (transl. New Bible Translation) and launched in Rotterdam by Queen Beatrix.

==== Bible in Plain Language ====
In 2014, the NBG published the Bijbel in Gewone Taal (transl. Bible in Plain Language). This translation, started in 2006, is new translation in contemporary vernacular Dutch and the first copy was presented to King Willem-Alexander, the patron of the NBG, on 1 October 2014.

=== Translation, publishing and distribution of the Bible in the East Indies ===
Not long after its establishment, the NBG also turned its attention to the distribution of the Bible in the Dutch East Indies. It started by reprinting the 1733 Leydekker Bible in Malay. In 1823, the NBG had also started its own initiative in translating the Bible into Javanese and other local languages of the East Indies. In 1826, the first NBG sponsored linguist and translator, Johann Friedrich Carl Gericke, was dispatched to Java and he completed a translation of the whole Bible in Javanese in 1854.

The NBG also sponsored other linguists and translators, including Herman Neubronner van der Tuuk (Batak), Nicolaus Adriani (Bare'e), Benjamin Frederik Matthes (Makassarese and Bugis), and Hendrik Kraemer. In 1895, a New Testament in the West Timorese Roti language was published by the NBG.

It was only after the establishment of the United Bible Societies (UBS) in 1946 and the Lembaga Alkitab Indonesia (transl. Indonesian Bible Society; LAI) in 1951 was the responsibility for translating the Bible into languages other than Dutch was transferred from the NBG to the UBS and LAI.

Bibles and Bible portions translated and published by the NBG in the languages and dialects of the Dutch East Indies include:

Year	Language	Portions	Primary Translator(s)
1821	Malay	Revision of the 1733 Leydekker Bible	M. Leydekker
1854	Javanese	Both the New and Old Testaments	J. H. C. Gericke
1863	Malay	New Testament in Low Malay	H. C. Klinkert
1867	Toba Batak	Books of Genesis, Exodus, Canonical Gospels, and Acts of the Apostles	H. N. van der Tuuk
1879	Malay	New and Old Testaments in High Malay	H. C. Klinkert
1890	Madura	Canonical Gospels and the Acts of the Apostles	J. P. Esser
1895	Roti	New Testament	
1896	Sangir	Canonical Gospels and the Acts of the Apostles	Clara Steller
1900	Makassarese	Both the New and Old Testaments	B. F. Matthes
1901	Bugis	Both the New and Old Testaments	B. F. Matthes
1911	Mentawai	Gospel of Luke	A. Lett
1913	Nias	Both the New and Old Testaments	W. H. Sundermann
1928	Karo Batak	New Testament	J. H. Neumann
1933	Bare'e	New Testament	N. Adriani
1938	Malay	New Testament	W. Bode
1948	Mori	New Testament	K. Riedel

=== The NBG today ===
In keeping with its goal of:

- Translating The Bible
- Making The Bible Available
- Increasing Engagement With The Bible

the NBG uses multiple platforms to increase Bible accessibility and literacy in the Netherlands, including the setting up of an online portal; debijbel.nl, that provides online resources for the study of the Bible.

The NBG, as a member of the UBS, also works closely with other affiliated Bible Societies to produce modern translations of the Bible and improve distribution channels.

== See also ==
- Christianity in the Netherlands
- Bible translations into Dutch
- Bible translations into the languages of Indonesia and Malaysia
- Bible translations into Malay
- United Bible Societies
