= Jan Van Hasel =

The New Testament in Dutch and Malay partially translated by Jan Van Hasel, published for the Verenigde Oostindische Compagnie (East India Company) Het Heylige Euangelium (1646)

Jan Van Hasel was a director of the Dutch East Indies Company (Dutch: Vereenigde Oostindische Compagnie; VOC) who is best known for producing one the first translations of portions of the Bible in the Malay language. Very little is known about Van Hasel except for his work in translating the Bible, his mission to Ayutthaya and his appointment as the head of the VOC mission to Surat.

== Background ==
The VOC was not only chartered with a monopoly on trade in the East Indies by the Dutch Republic but also on all aspects of Dutch involvement in the East Indies. While the VOC did not encourage missionary work, it did sponsor chaplains, both clerical and lay, for the Dutch population as well as tolerated efforts to proselytise native Roman Catholics who had been converted by Portuguese missionaries earlier, particularly in Ambon.

With the partially Protestant Reformation inspired Dutch Revolt still ongoing in the home provinces against the Roman Catholic Spanish Empire (of which Portugal was then a part of), the motivation to undermine Portuguese trade and religious influence in the East Indies may have motivated this tolerance of proselytisation.

== Translation work ==
A translation of the Gospel of Matthew was completed by Van Hasel as early as 1602 but was not published as the 1612 translation by Albert Cornelius Ruyl was preferred by the VOC. As Ruyl was unable to complete his translation of all four Gospels before he died, Van Hasel persevered with his translation work and the Gospels of Luke and John was published in Amsterdam in a Dutch-Malay diglot in 1646.

Both Ruyl and Van Hasel's translations were then compared to the Dutch Statenvertaling, the 1637 official Dutch translation of the Bible, revised by Daniel Brouwerious and published in a single volume in 1651 in Amsterdam.

== Later career ==
In 1624, a Spanish ship sailing from Siam where it had taken shelter as a result of a storm, attacked the passing Dutch yacht Zeelandt at night. The Spanish entered the VOC ship with the loss of only one man. The crew and the merchandise aboard were captured. King Songtham of Ayutthaya sent a message to the Spanish commander, Don Fernando de Silva stating that he should return the ship and set the crew free, since it was captured in Siamese territorial waters. The request was refused rudely and as a result, the Spanish docked in Siam was attacked and the Zeelandt captured by the Siamese.

The king returned after negotiating the Zeelandt to the Dutch, but its cargo remained locked in his warehouses. In order to negotiate the cargo, the Governor General in Batavia, Pieter de Carpentier, sent Van Hasel to Siam. The latter succeeded in partly recuperating the Dutch merchandise. The Spanish-Dutch incident would bring Siam on the brink of war with Spain, while at the same time Portugal lost their favorite status in Siam and could no more obtain proper access to the Siamese Court.

In 1628, Van Hasel was appointed the head of the VOC trade mission to the prosperous Mughal port city of Surat.

Not much is known about Van Hasel after that.

== See also ==
- Bible translations into the languages of Indonesia and Malaysia
- Bible translations into Malay
- Christianity in Indonesia
- Christianity in Malaysia
