= Albert Cornelius Ruyl =

Dutch trade and translator of Bible into Malay

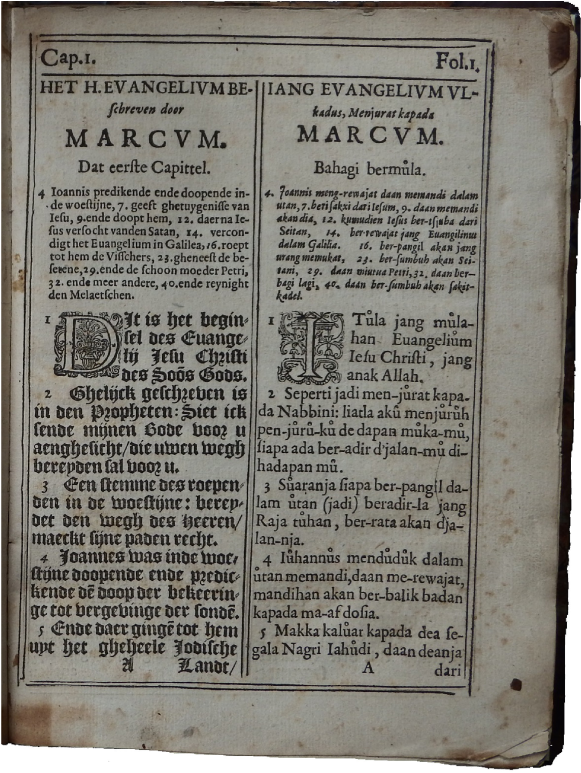
Only extant copy of the 1629 first edition of Ruyl's translation of the Gospel of Mark in Malay from the Lincoln Cathedral Library

Albert Cornelius Ruyl (also known as Albert Cornelisz Ruyl or A. C. Ruyl) was a trader with the Dutch East Indies Company (VOC) who is best known for producing the first translation of portions of the Bible in the Malay language. Very little is known about Ruyl except for his work in translating the Bible and his mission to Morocco.

== Background ==
Ruyl is known to have come from Enkhuizen and his first visit to the East Indies was probably in 1600 and by the time the VOC had established their permanent trading posts in Banten in 1603 and Batavia in 1611, was already established as a koopman or merchant in the region with a relatively good command of the Malay language, the regional lingua franca of trade.

The VOC was not only chartered with a monopoly on trade in the East Indies by the Dutch Republic but also on all aspects of Dutch involvement in the East Indies. While the VOC did not encourage missionary work, it did sponsor chaplains, both clerical and lay (of which Ruyl may have been one), for the Dutch population as well as tolerated efforts to proselytise native Roman Catholics who had been converted by Portuguese missionaries earlier, particularly in Ambon.

With the partially Protestant Reformation inspired Dutch Revolt still ongoing in the home provinces against the Roman Catholic Spanish Empire (of which Portugal was then a part), the motivation to undermine Portuguese trade and religious influence in the East Indies may have motivated this tolerance of proselytisation.

== Translation work ==
Front page of "Sovrat A. B. C.", translated into Malay from Philip van Marnix's "A. B. Boek" by Albert Ruyl in 1611

The VOC published a primer entitled Sovrat ABC akan mengayd’jer anack boudack seperty deayd’jern’ja capada segala manusia Nassarany: daen beerbagy sombahayang Christaan (transl. ABC Letters: Intended to Teach Children The Same Material Intended For All Christians and Some Christian Prayers), a translation of Philip van Marnix's A. B. Boek, in 1611. While the translator is not mentioned, it is widely credited to Ruyl and was mentioned in the foreword of Ruyl's 1612 translation of van Marnix's small catechism, Spieghel, van de Maleysche Tale.

In 1612, Ruyl had completed his translation of the Gospel of Matthew in the Malay language in the Jawi script, the common script that was used to then write Malay. This was however published in 1629 in the Latin script as a Dutch-Malay diglot. This was followed by a translation of the Gospel of Mark that was also published as a Dutch-Malay diglot in 1638 which also included translations of the Ten Commandments, the Benedictus, the Greater Doxology, the Magnificat, the Nunc dimittis, the Apostles Creed, the Lord's Prayer, and a few other liturgical prayers and canticles.

This work was later published together with the translation of the Gospels of John and Luke that was done by a VOC clerk, Jan Van Hasel in 1646. Ruyl's translations were based on early Dutch translations of the Bible that were themselves based on translations of the Vulgate and Martin Luther's translation. It was only after the official Statenvertaling version of the Dutch Bible was published in 1637 that it was used as the basis of later translations in the seventeenth century.

== Commissioner to Morocco ==
In 1622, the States General of the Netherlands assigned Ruyl as a Commissioner to lead a mission to Morocco, a state that was allied with the Dutch Republic, to explore the building of a port in Ras Cantin. He was accompanied in the mission by Joseph Pallache and Jacob Gool.

Ruyl's relationship with the Pallaches was extremely strained and he stayed in Morocco for seven months, mostly in Safi, without ever being granted permission to inspect the Ras Cantin area or an audience with the Sultan, Mulay Zidan. Upon the irrevocable failure of the Moroccan mission, he was granted permission to return to the Netherlands with the newly appointed Moroccan ambassador, Yussef Biscaino. Upon his return, Biscaino's first act was to lodge a formal complaint with the States-General on the alleged misconduct of Ruyl and the States-General was forced to place Ruyl under house arrest and forbade his entry into The Hague.

While Ruyl's mission to Morocco was deemed a failure, his detailed journals provide a lot of information about the Pallaches and the socio-political situation of Morocco in that period.

Not much is known about Ruyl's fate after his house arrest.

== See also ==
- Bible translations into the languages of Indonesia and Malaysia
- Bible translations into Malay
- Christianity in Indonesia
- Christianity in Malaysia
