= Nicolaus Adriani =

Dutch linguist (1865–1926)

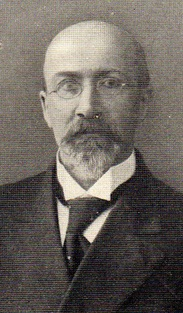
- Born: 15 September 1865; Oud-Loosdrecht, Netherlands
- Died: 5 August 1926 (aged 60); Poso, Dutch East Indies (now Indonesia)

Academic background
- Education: Leiden University

Nicolaus Adriani (15 September 1865 – 5 August 1926) was a Dutch linguist who worked in Indonesia. He studied linguistics of the East Indies at Leiden University, obtaining his PhD in 1893. He was sent by the Netherlands Bible Society. He worked as a linguist in Poso, Central Sulawesi.

In 1897, Adriani became a correspondent of the Royal Netherlands Academy of Arts and Sciences, and in 1918 he joined as a member.

== Selected works ==
- Adriani, N., 1894. Sangireesche spraakkunst. 's Gravenhage: Martin Nijhoff.
- Adriani, Nicolaus. 1912. De Baree-Sprekende Toradja's van Midden Celebes.
- Adriani, Nicolaus. 1919. Posso (Midden-Celebes). Boekhandel van den Zendingsstudie-raad.
- Adriani, Nicolaus. 1928. Bare'e-Nederlandsch woordenboek: met Nederlandsch-Bare'e register. EJ Brill.
- Adriani, Nicolaus. 1928. "Spraakkunstige schets van de taal der Mĕntawai-Eilanden." Bijdragen tot de Taal-, Land-en Volkenkunde van Nederlandsch-Indië 1ste Afl, 1-117.
- Adriani, Nicolaus, and Albertus C. Kruyt. The Bare'e-speaking Toradja of Central Celebes:(the East Toradja).
- Adriani, Nicolaus, and Albertus C. Kruyt. 1914. "De Bare’e-sprekende Toradja’s van Midden-Celebes. Vol 3: Taal-en letterkundige schets der Bare’e taal en overzicht van het taalgebied: Celebes-Zuid-Halmahera." Batavia: Landsdrukkerij (1914). (Adriani, Nicolaus. Posso (Midden-Celebes). Boekhandel van den Zendingsstudie-raad, 1919.(Human Relations Area Files, 1968.)
