= La Galigo =

Creation myth of the Bugis from South Sulawesi

Sureq Galigo or La Galigo is a creation myth of the Bugis from South Sulawesi in modern-day Indonesia, written down in manuscript form between the 18th and 20th century in the language Bugis, based on an earlier oral tradition.

It was adapted into I La Galigo, a music theater work by Robert Wilson.

== Description ==
The poem is composed in pentameters and relates the story of humanity's origins but serves also as practical everyday almanac. It evolved mostly through oral tradition and is still sung on important occasions. The earliest preserved written versions date back to the 18th century, earlier ones have been lost due to insects, climate or destruction. Consequently, there is no complete or definite version of Galigo but the preserved parts amount to 6,000 pages or 300,000 lines of text, making it one of the largest works of literature. The original Bugis language, in which also the production is sung, is now only understood by fewer than 100 people but so far only parts of it have been translated into Indonesian and no complete English language version exists either.

The majority of extant La Galigo manuscripts can be found in Indonesia and the Netherlands. Leiden University Libraries keeps one of the most valuable manuscripts. The Leiden manuscript consists of twelve volumes and relates the first part of the long Buginese epic. This largest coherent La Galigo fragment in the world was written in Makassar at the request of the theologian and scholar Benjamin Frederik Matthes (1818–1908). In 1847 Matthes entered the service of the Netherlands Bible Society to study Bugis and Makassarese with the purpose of translating the Bible into those languages.

The text was written by Colliq Pujié (Arung Pancana Toa), Queen Mother of Tanete, a small kingdom in South Sulawesi. The manuscript is now part of the collection Indonesian manuscripts of the Netherlands Bible Society, given on permanent loan to the Leiden University Libraries since the years 1905–1915.

Together with another La Galigo manuscript, held in Makassar, the Leiden manuscript was included in 2012 in UNESCO's Memory of the World (MOW) Register as the second document from Indonesia after Negarakertagama in 2008 to earn the acknowledgement. In 2017, the Leiden manuscript has been made digitally available.

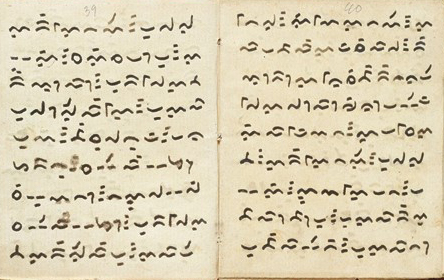
La Galigo Buginese epic written in the Lontara script.

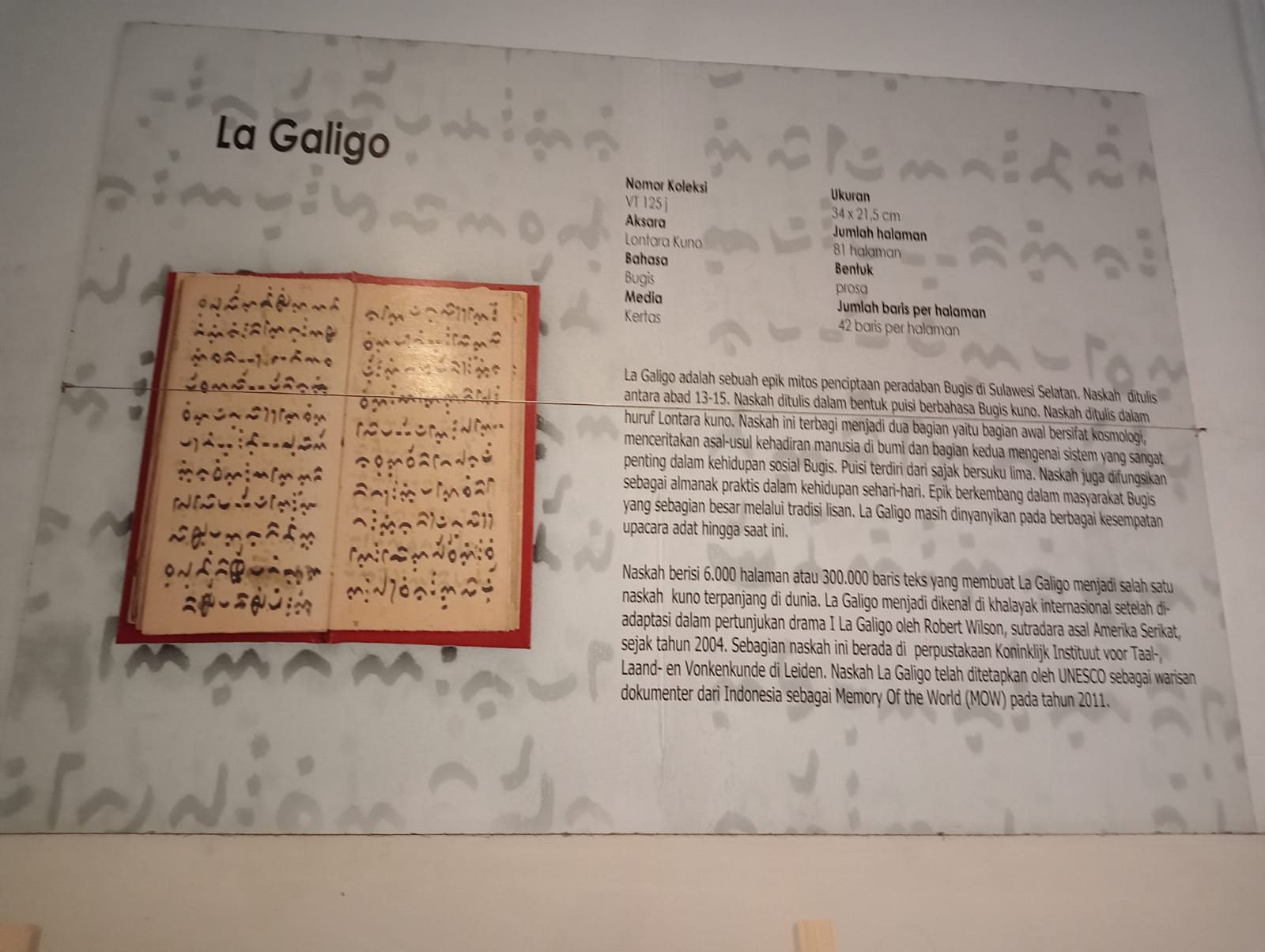
La Galigo collections in the national library Perpustakaan Nasional Republik Indonesia, Jalan Medan Merdeka Selatan, Jakarta.

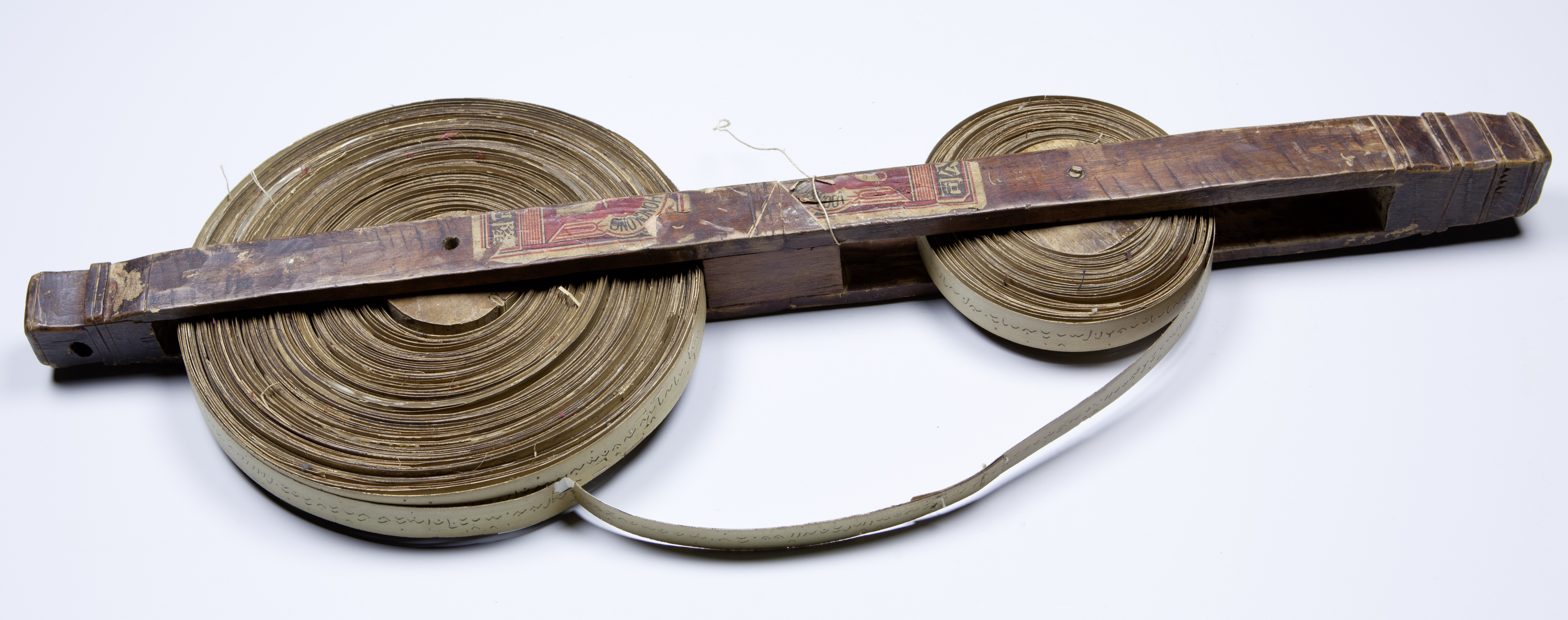
"I La Galigo", the initial part of the Buginese lyrical epos in lontara format, before 1907.

== Theatrical adaptation ==
- The music-theatre I La Galigo by Robert Wilson.
  - The 2017 musical Galigo: The Chaos Within, by NUANSA cultural production.

== Genealogy ==
Sureq La Galigo simplified genealogy

La Patiganna ♂ Patotoqé, King of Heaven; He who destines fate	Datu Palingéq ♀	Guru ri Selleng ♂ King of the Underworld
La Toge'langi' ♂ (La Togeq Langiq); Batara Guru; First King of Earth	Wé Nyili'timo' ♀ (Wé Nyiliq Timoq)
Datu Cina ♂ King of Cina	La Tiuleng ♂ Batara Lattu'(q)	Wé Opu; Sengngeng ♀
Wé Cudai(q) ♀ Lookalike of Wé Tenri(y)abēng	Sawérigading ♂ Main hero	Wé Tenri(y)abēng ♀ Twin sister of Sawérigading
I La Galigo To Boto ♂ Datunna Kelling	Wé Tenrigangka ♀
La Tenritatta' ♂

Sinaung Toja ♀ Twin sister of Patotoqé
Remmangrilangi' ♂ He who lives in Paradise

== Quotations ==
=== Opening section of the epic (Leiden manuscript NBG 188) ===
The I La Galigo cycle of stories begins with the waking up of the God of Heaven To Palanroé on a beautiful morning. He traverses the Thunder Chamber clad in a sarong made of lightning.

Buginese original
Ia naé pammulanna Sureq Galigoé.
Inappa mpunga mawajiq mua lé tikkaqé ri Boting Langiq,
napappaq baja ri Senrijawa,
pajaneng ompoq walinonoé ri Rualletté
natokkong ronnang To Palanroé
riulillingeng ulampu kati
wéro rakkileq limpengié ngngi
rilodungiang calaq goari guttuq nalalo
lalo saliweng massalimperrang sampuq riappiq
warani wéro ileq rinaga
majjalékkai alawa guttuq,
sikkureng mpali tangeq pareppaq
sawé maccokkong ri jarasana rakkileqé.

- Unknown author.

Translation
This is the beginning of the Book of Galigo.
The sun had just risen in Boting Langiq,
the following morning in Senrijawa,
the Sun shone brightly in Rialletté,
at that moment To Palanroé awoke,
the golden canopy was parted
by the lightning that enveloped him,
the thunder chamber lock was opened and he passed through,
moving forward, wrapped in a sarong
whose edges were edged with threads of lightning
stepping over the barrier of thunder,
pushing open the door of the lightning
arriving to crouch on the bench of lightning.

- Relay translation from the Buginese into Bahasa Indonesia by Salem and Enre 1995, then translated to English with DeepL.com (free version)

=== Creation of the first human being ===
Back from a journey to the Middleworld, three servants of the King of Heaven, Patotoqé (La Patiganna), report to him that they found it astonishingly empty, and venture a suggestion.

Buginese original
Lé namasuaq mua na sia
mattampa puang lé ri Batara
mappaleq wali ri Pérétiwi.
Tammaga Puang muloq séua rijajiammu,
tabareq-bareq ri atawareng,
ajaqnaonro lobbang linoé
makkatajangeng ri atawareng.
Teddéwata iq, Puang, rékkua masuaq tau
ri awa langiq, lé ri ménéqna Pérétiwié
mattampa puang lé ri Batara.

- Unknown author.

Translation
There is no one
to call the gods Lord,
or to offer praise to the Underworld.
Why, Lord, don't you have one of your children descend
and incarnate him on the earth,
do not leave the earth empty,
the earth uninhabited.
You are not a god, Lord, if there are no humans
under the heavens, above the Underworld,
to call the gods Lord.

- Translation by Koolhof.

With the consent of his wife Patotoqué then sends his eldest son, Batara Guru, down to the Middleworld as the first human being.

=== Incest is banned ===
When the main hero of La Galigo, Sawérigading, finally discovers that he has a twin sister, Wé Tenriabéng, he passionately falls in love with her at first sight. Of course a marriage is out of the question, as she and their parents argue. His mother explains why.

Buginese original
Risapa siparukkusenngédé
taué lé massélingéreng.
Apaq pajaneng mulingérang ngi solang tanamu.
Peppeq i matti tomaégamu,
naléléi wi roppo lipué.
Mau sipolo tikka taué, sikédé nyiliq,
tempeqding to siparukkuseng massélingéreng,
apaq labu i matti lipué,
napopo reppaq tenreq mammutid
ttudang riLino lé tomaéga nalurenngé.

- Author unknown.

Translation
It is forbidden to become a couple
for people who are siblings.
Obviously you would call down disaster upon your country.
The people will die,
the country destroyed.
Be it for half a day, an eyeblink,
siblings cannot become a couple,
because the country will submerge,
it will be ruined
none of the people in the world will be saved.

- Translation by Koolhof.

However, at first Sawérigading is not convinced:

Buginese original
Taro i mate tomaégaé,
taro i peppeq paqbanuaé,
naé rékkua jaji mua ni nawa-nawakku,
tonging mua ni lé manasakku.

- Unknown author.

Translation
Let the people die,
let the villages be exterminated,
as long ads my wish comes true,
my hopes are fulfilled.

- Translation by Koolhof.

== Outline of the twelve NBG 188 manuscripts ==
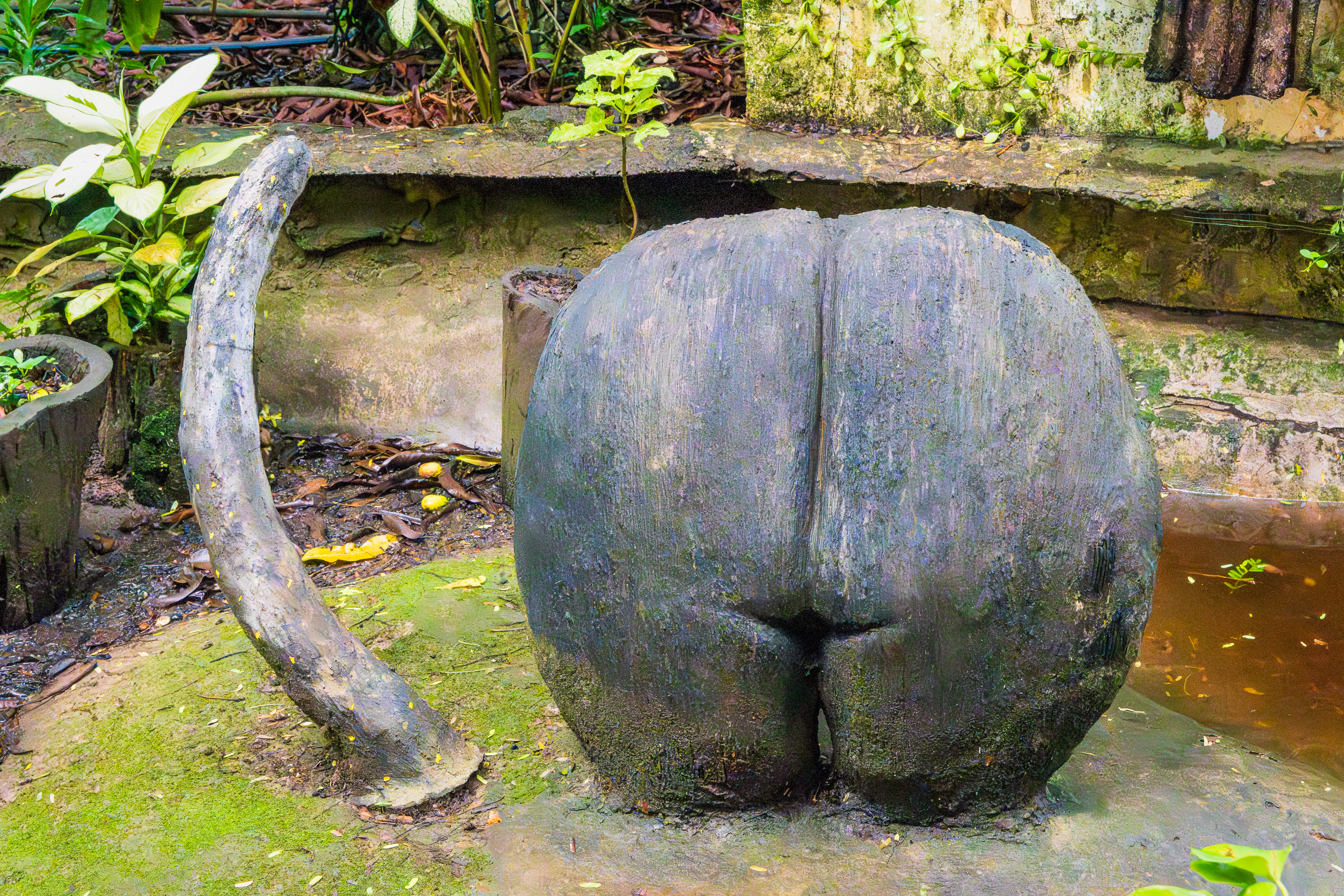
Pao Jengki sea coconut, mentioned in Volume 6 of the NBG 188 Leiden manuscript. Coco de Mer from Ile Moyenne, Sainte Anne Marine National Park, Seychelles, 2025.

These twelve manuscripts are part of the UNESCO Memory of the World 2011 entry for La Galigo and consist of 2.851 pages, covering about one-third of the total epic, starting from the beginning. They are at the Leiden University Libraries on permanent loan from the Dutch-Flemish Bible Society (formerly Nederlands Bijbelgenootschap, NBG).

Volume NBG-Boeg 188	Number of pages	Content
1	196	Batara Guru, son of the Creator God, descends from Heaven, called Boting Langi, to the still uninhabited Middle World (Alé Lino) and reaches the land of the later Kingdom of Luwu (Luwuq). He marries Lady Wé Nyiliq Timoq who rose from the Underworld (Pérétiwi). They beget a son Batara Guru who has to undergo manifold festive ceremonies including sitting on a swing. Similarly, I Pada Uleng (♀) ascends from the Underworld, as La Urung Mpessi (La Urumpessi, ♂) comes down from Heaven founding the kingdom of Tompoq Tikkaq (Tompo’tika’). After marrying and begetting two earthly daughters, Wé Adiluwuq and Wé Opu Sengngeng, all on the same day, they die. The daughters are expelled from the realm.
2	204	However, both girls return to Tompoq Tikkaq and lodge comfortably with Wé Temmamala. Batara Guru visits Heaven to consult his godly father on selecting a suitable wife for his son. Batara Lattuq is dispatched to Tompoq Tikkaq and marries Wé Opu Sengngeng, while her sister Wé Adiluwuq is wed to Batara Lattuq's nephew. Batara Lattuq and his bride Wé Opu Sengngeng go back to Luwuq to visit his parents. She then gets pregnant, thanks to the prayers of Batara Lattuq's parents, and accordingly desires all kinds of delicacies.
3	240	Birds are tasked to fetch the desired dainties for the palace. Wé Opu Sengngeng gives birth to twins, the boy Sawérigading and the girl Wé Tenriabéng. The same baby ceremonies of Volume 1 are performed. Batara Guru and his wives retire to Heaven. Grandson Sawérigading, too, visits Heaven to meet the Creator but comes down again to the Middle World to marry his niece Wé Panangngareng.
4	291	Sawérigading manages to marry nearly all his nieces, and pays visits to his vassals in the kingdom of Luwuq. He continues to Tompoq Tikkaq where he finds there to be national mourning. Princess Wé Tenrirawé had to be banished to prevent an incestuous relationship developing with her twin brother Palawagauq. Further journeys by Sawérigading, e.g., to the Maluku Islands to attend the tattooing of Maloku's regent. Sawérigading has a fling with the wife of La Tenroaji in Malatunrung, South Sulawesi, near Palopo.
5	254	Sawérigading continues his tour to, for instance, Kelling, Tessililu (Tassililu, Sinjai Barat, Sinjai), and Taranati, finally arriving at the palojang, a deep hole and an entrance of the Underworld. Sawérigading descends into the Underworld, meeting the soul of Wé Pinrakati, daughter of the King of Malaka. He falls in love and wants to marry her, but marrying the dead is not feasible. However, in Samang (Maloku) he is promised the young princess Welléq Ri Cina, the young daughter of I La Galigo To Kelling, but he will have to wait. So Sawérigading returns to Luwuq, soon to start a new trip, now with his wife and niece Wé Panangngareng, jointly riding the bird Marempoba.
6	254	Sawérigading is invited to Tompoq Tikkaq to attend the ceremonial renewal of the graves of La Urung Mpessi and Lady Wé Pada Uleng. He sets out to visit his fiancée Welléq Ri Cina, but he is told that she died three years ago. Sawérigading decides to retrieve her from the Underworld. He reaches Bima and comes to the sacred Pao Jengki tree ("Jenki mango" or sea double coconut, Lodoicea maldivica, Pauh Janggi in Malay. The largest seed in the plant kingdom.) in the middle of the sea, with its roots in a whirlpool reaching down into the Underworld and branches up into Heaven. At the centre of the Earth, Sawérigading fights against Lettéq Warani, until he realises that Lettéq is a brother of his own grandfather Batara Guru. Then Sawérigading wages war against Dettia Pajung, West of the earth's centre, and defeats him. In the end Sawérigading retrieves his fiancée.
7	250	In Pamasareng, Sawérigading wages war against La Daéng Lebbiq killing him, and conquering Pamasareng. But Welléq Ri Cina does not want to return to Earth. Sawérigading departs to visit all the unvisited countries. Returning to Luwuq, he falls in love with his twin sister, Lady Wé Tenriabéng.
8	226	Wé Tenriabéng succeeds in convincing her twin brother Sawérigading to court Lady I Wé Cudaiq instead of herself. Wé Cudaiq is a daughter of the king of Cina on Sulawesi and granddaughter of La Urung Mpessi and Lady Wé Pada Uleng. After building a ship using the timber from the felled wélenréng tree, Sawérigading departs for Cina, meanwhile fighting many battles. Wé Tenriabéng, his twin sister, leaves in three days for Heaven.
9	220	After some complications on the way, in Cina Sawérigading pretends to be a merchant and puts on the facial skin of the Oro king, La Pabokori, as a mask to slip into the palace La Tanété (Tanétté). After obtaining a glimpse of princess I Wé Cudaiq, the daughter of La Sattung Mpugiq, king of Cina, he proposes marriage and is accepted. The dowry is paid over the next three months.
10	222	But then princess I Wé Cudaiq refuses to marry Sawérigading. Although the dowry's return begins, after only one day the people of Cina falsely claim falsely that the total dowry has been refunded. Frustrated, Sawérigading starts hostilities and manages to conquer Cina. He then shapeshifts into a breeze and drops by I Wé Cudaiq without her noticing. Sawérigading's twin sister, Wé Tenriabéng, pulls it off to send down from Heaven to Earth the entire land of Malimongeng, palace, gardens and all. This time Sawérigading marries I Wé Cimpau, queen of Lémpang. However, after three months I Wé Cudaiq and Sawérigading reconcile and he pays her a visit every night for some months.
11	394	When I Wé Cudaiq gets pregnant, Sawérigading stops visiting her. She gives birth to I La Galigo and I Wé Cimpau to a daughter called Wé Makawaru Daéng Paraga. I La Galigo is thrown out of the palace and sent away to Mario, because his mother refuses to live with him any longer. Sawérigading transfers I La Galigo back to Cina. His marriage with I Wé Cudaiq becomes known and both his families come to live together in the palace La Tanété. I Wé Cudaiq tries in vain to kill I Wé Cimpau.
12	242	I Wé Cudaiq gives birth to two more daughters, Wé Tenribalobo and Wé Tenridio. A high spirit takes possession of Wé Tenridio so that she becomes an androgynous bissu priest. Her brother I La Galigo travels to Luwuq to get special bissu attributes for her. There he marries Rajeng Risompa. After I La Galigo's return to Cina, a small bissu house is built for the ceremonial initiation of Wé Tenridio.

== Literature ==
- Kern, Rudolf Aernoud (1939). Catalogus van de Boegineesche, tot den I La Galigo-cyclus behoorende handschriften der Leidsche Universiteitsbibliotheek, alsmede van die in andere Europeesche bibliotheken [Catalogue of the Buginese manuscripts belonging to the I La Galigo collection at the Leiden University Library, as well as those held in other European libraries] (in Dutch). OCLC 869208629. vii, 1088 pp.
  - Kern, R.A. (1999). "Aanvulling op de Catalogus van de Boegineesche, tot den I La Galigo behoorende handschriften der Leidsche Universiteitsbibliotheek alsmede van die in andere Europeesche bibliotheken" [Supplement to the Catalogue of the Buginese manuscripts belonging to the I La Galigo collection at the Leiden University Library, as well as those held in other European libraries] (PDF) (in Dutch). OCLC 869361958. 125 pp.
- Koolhof, Sirtjo (1999). "The 'La Galigo': A Bugis Encyclopedia and its Growth". Bijdragen tot de Taal-, Land- en Volkenkunde. 155 (3): 362–387. doi:10.1163/22134379-90003869. JSTOR 27865543.
- Matthes, B. F. (1864–1872). Boeginesche chrestomathie. Amsterdam: Nederlandsch Bijbelgenootschap ; Nederlandsch Gouvernement. OCLC 69148764. 3 volumes. Vol. 1 published on behalf of the Dutch Bible Society, Amsterdam, periodical Bijbelmagazijn, and printed in Makassar by K. Sutherland. Vols. 2 and 3 published on behalf of the Dutch Government, and printed in Amsterdam by C.A. Spin & Sons. With a second title page in Buginese: Yinae surĕq Wugi sakkĕ-rupa.
- Matthes, Benjamin F. (1872). Aanteekeningen op de Boeginesche Chrestomathie, Afgevaardigde van het Nederlandsh Bijbelgenootschap op Celebes, uitgegeven voor rekening van het Nederlandsch Gouvernement (in Dutch). Amsterdam: C.A. Spin & Zoon. pp. 250–262. OCLC 974095050. Two volumes.
- Matthes, B.F. (1875). Kort verslag aangaande alle mij in Europa bekende Makassaarsche en Boeginesche handschriften, vooral die van het Nederlandsch Bijbelgenootschap te Amsterdam [Brief report on all the Makassarese and Buginese manuscripts known to me in Europe, especially those of the Dutch Bible Society in Amsterdam] (in Dutch). Amsterdam: Nederlandsch Bijbelgenootschap. OCLC 741566754. VIII and 101 pages.
- Salim M, Fachruddin AE, Rahman N, Toa AP, Koolhof S, Tol R (1995). I La Galigo : menurut naskah NBG 188 / Jil. 1, I La Galigo / yang disusun oleh Arung Pancana Toa; transkripsi dan terj [I La Galigo: according to the manuscript NBG 188 / Volume 1, I La Galigo / compiled by Arung Pancana Toa; transcription and translation] (in Indonesian). Jakarta: Djambatan : Koninklijk Instituut voor Taal-, Land- en Volkenkunde (KITLV Leiden). ISBN 9789794282212. OCLC 770941882. 575 pages.
- Zainal, A.A.; Macknight, C.C. (1974). "The I La Galigo Epic Cycle of South Celebes and Its Diffusion" (PDF). Indonesia. 17 (April): 161–169. doi:10.2307/3350778. hdl:1813/53576. JSTOR 3350778.

=== Translations ===
- Enre, Fachruddin Ambo (1999). Ritumpanna Welenrennge: Sebuah Episoda Sastra Bugis Klasik Galigo [Ritumpanna Welenrennge (The Felling of the Welenreng Tree): An Episode from the Classical Bugis Literary Work Galigo] (in Indonesian). EFEO, FSUI, dan Yayasan Obor Indonesia. ISBN 9789794613184.
- Retna Kencana Colliq Pujie Arung Pancana Toa (2000). Rahman, Nurhayati (ed.). I La Galigo: Menurut Naskah NBG 188 Jilid II (Book, #2) [I La Galigo: According to Manuscript NBG 188]. La Galigo Menurut Naskah NBG 188 (in Indonesian). Translated by Salim, Muhammad; Enre, Fachruddin Ambo. Lembaga Penerbitan Universitas Hasanuddin. ISBN 9789795300281. OCLC 772960323. 619 pages. Author also styled as Arung Pancana Toa.
- Retna Kencana Colliq Pujie Arung Pancana Toa (2017). Rahman, Nurhayati (ed.). La Galigo Menurut Naskah NBG 188 #3 La Galigo: Menurut Naskah NBG 188 [I La Galigo: According to Manuscript NBG 188 Jilid 3 (Volume 3)]. La Galigo Menurut Naskah NBG 188 (in Indonesian). Yayasan Pustaka Obor dan Yayasan La Galigo (The Obor Library Foundation and the La Galigo Foundation). ISBN 9786024334765. 616 pages. Author also styled as Arung Pancana Toa.

... Translation book 6

- Ram, Nunding; (unknown), Yusuf; Said, Lely Yuliani (2011). I La Galigo. 6 (in Indonesian). Makassar: Pustaka Refleksi. ISBN 9789793570341. OCLC 756486451. VIII + 122 pages.
