= Siti Aisyah We Tenriolle =

Queen (Datu) regnant of the Kingdom of Tanete, South Sulawesi from 1855 to 1910

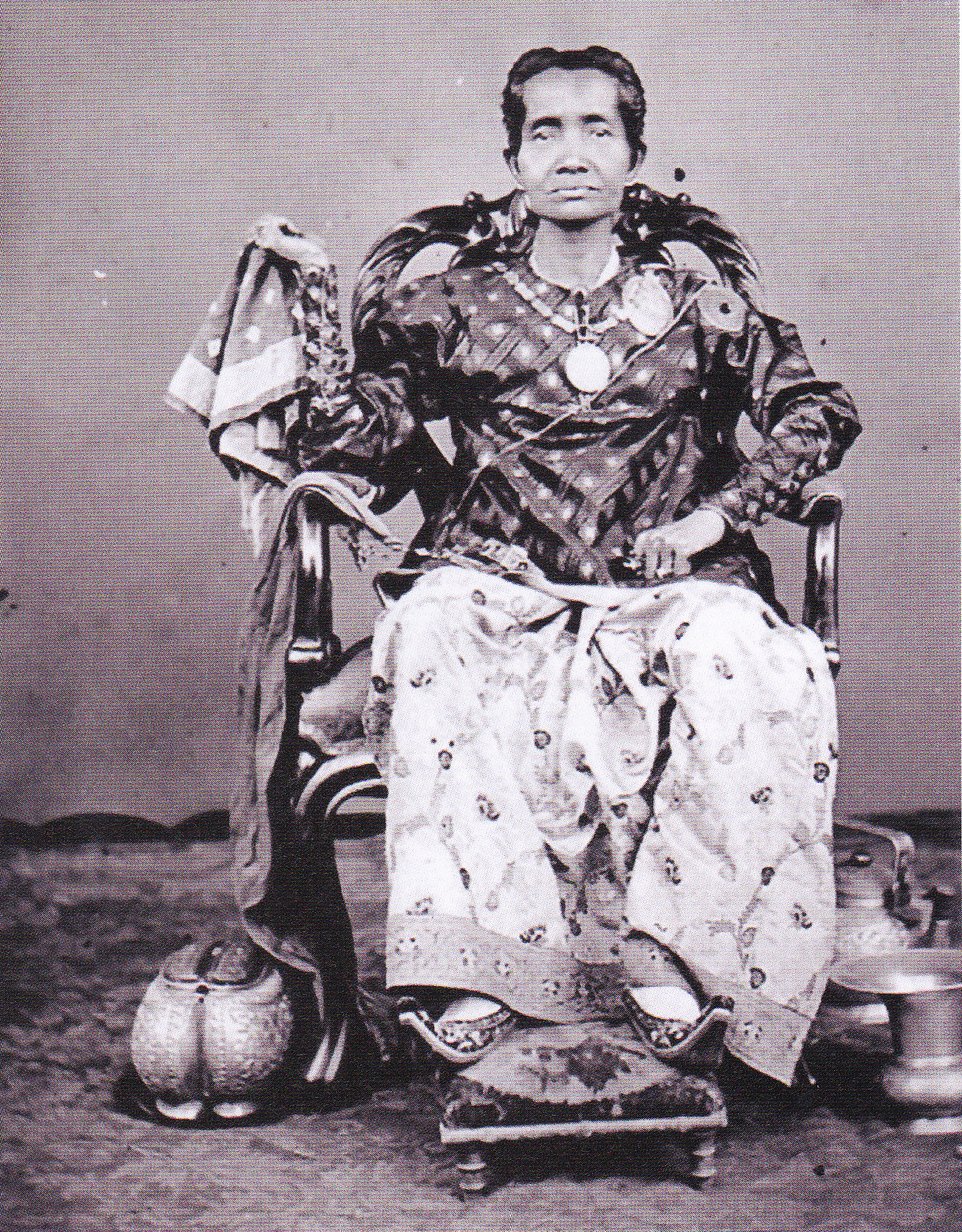
Siti Aisyah We Tenriolle around 1870. Photo by Hendrik Veen.

Siti Aisyah We Tenriolle (died 1919), was the Queen ("Datu") regnant of the Kingdom of Tanete, South Sulawesi from 1855 to 1910.

Her birth date is unknown.

Siti Aisyah We Tenriolle helped to emancipate the women leaders from the tribe of Bugis, Tanete Sand South Sulawesi, Indonesia while serving as queen. Siti Aisyah We Tenriolle also controlled the Kingdom of Bugis. A major contribution of Siti Aisyah We Tenriolle was translating the epic piece La Galigo from the ancient Buginese language.

She died in 1919, in the village of Pancana Tanette ri Lau.
