= DBNL =

DBNL may refer to:

- Digital Library for Dutch Literature (Dutch: Digitale Bibliotheek voor de Nederlandse Letteren)
- Drebrin-like, a protein encoded by the DBNL gene
