= Herman Neubronner van der Tuuk =

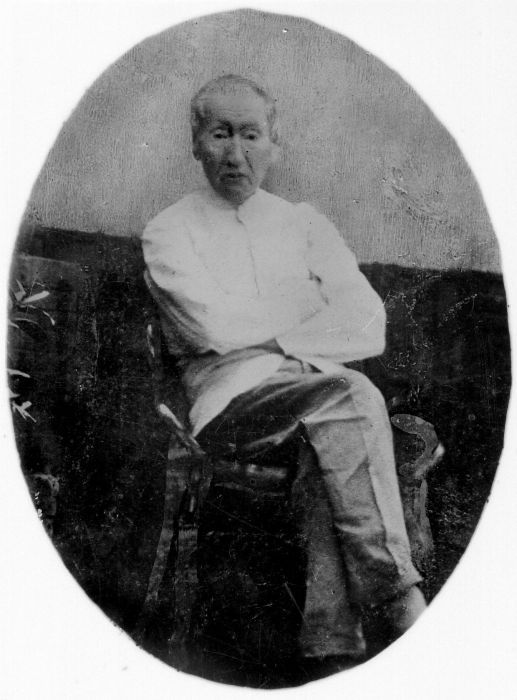
- Born: 23 February 1824; Dutch Malacca, Malaya, Dutch East Indies (now Malacca, Malaysia)
- Died: 17 August 1894 (aged 70); Surabaya, Dutch East Indies
- Scientific career
- Fields: Linguistics

Herman Neubronner van der Tuuk (23 February 1824 – 17 August 1894) was a Bible translator and linguist specialising in the languages of the Dutch East Indies.

== Early years and studies ==
Van der Tuuk was born in Malacca (part of the Dutch East Indies at that time), where his father, a Dutch lawyer, had settled and had married a half German and half Dutch Eurasian wife named Louisa. Her surname being Neubronner, it was added as a middle name to “Herman”. In 1825, the Treaty of London (1824) took effect, and Malacca became British in exchange for Bengkulu (a region in Sumatra). As a consequence, the Van der Tuuk family moved to Surabaya on the Isle of Java.

At the age of about twelve, Van der Tuuk was sent to the Netherlands, where he attended grammar school and in 1840, aged sixteen, took the entrance exam to Groningen University. He read law, but his interests were in the field of linguistics, and in 1845 he moved to Leiden University to read Arabic and Persian with Th.W. Juynboll, a famous scholar in Arabic studies. Van der Tuuk also read Sanskrit and acquired a thorough grounding in Malay.

== Linguistics and linguistic politics in the East Indies ==
Linguistic activities in the Dutch East Indies were motivated by missionary activities until well into the nineteenth century. Linguistic studies were taken up with a view to translating the Bible into Indonesian languages, and Malay and Javanese served as starting points. By the middle of the nineteenth century, religious linguists were ready to turn to research into other indigenous languages and to translate the Bible into them.

One of the first languages (or rather, language groups) chosen for this purpose was Batak. The choice was motivated by political motives as well as religious ones. Roman Catholic missionaries, who had been banned from carrying out their activities, were re-admitted to the colony from 1807, and throughout the nineteenth century were in tough competition with their Protestant opposite numbers. Another motive was the desire to keep Islam in check. The Malay population of East-Sumatra and of the coastal regions had become predominantly Muslim by this time, but the ethnic groups in the interior had not been converted, and were, as contemporary terminology had it, still “pagans”. It was assumed they would be more receptive to conversion than those already Islamised. Among these interior tribes were the Batak. Protestant mission from the Netherlands was in the hands of Nederlands Bijbel Genootschap (“Society for the Translation of the Bible”, NBG).

== Linguist ==
In all but name, Van der Tuuk was still reading law, but he had become noted for his phenomenal aptitude at studying languages, and on the basis of that reputation, NBG resolved to send him to the Batak regions to study their languages. These interior regions of Sumatra were still largely unknown to westerners at that time, so it was left to Van der Tuuk to decide which Batak language to research with a view to translating the Bible into it. In the end, he opted for Toba Batak.

Van der Tuuk reached Java in 1849. He at once fell seriously ill, and indeed was to be haunted by various diseases and by depressions for the rest of his life. The remedy chosen in his case was a sulphur treatment, which appears only to have worsened his condition, and in letters which testify to his confusion, Van der Tuuk requested that NBG relieve him of his duties. They declined, the reason probably being that they had learnt about his condition.

In 1851, he had recovered sufficiently to be able to depart for the Batak regions. By way of Padang, he reached the coastal village of Siboga (alternatively known as Sibolga), where, however, conditions were not conducive to success. Many inhabitants were coastal Malays, and for closer contact with Batak, he had to travel into the interior. He did not succeed before 1852, when he traveled inland some sixty miles. Later, he was to make another trip inland, becoming the first European to set eyes on Lake Toba. By that time he had settled in the more northern coastal town of Baroes (alternatively known as Barus), where Batak influence was still strong.

His assignment had a linguistic component (writing a dictionary and a grammar of the language studied) as well as a practical one (translating the Bible into that language). In 1854, however, he fell ill again, and apparently suffered from a liver complaint and renewed depressions. As a result, he had to return to the Netherlands for convalescence in 1856. He remained in Europe until 1868, translating books of the Bible into Batak (1859), publishing his Dictionary of Batak (1861), formulating his linguistic laws, and receiving an honorary doctor's degree from Utrecht University in 1861.

In 1862, NBG judged that Van der Tuuk was able to depart for the Dutch East Indies once more. The need was now felt for a Bible translation into Balinese, and Van der Tuuk was to be stationed on the Isle of Bali. Van der Tuuk did not allow himself to be affected by these considerations. He remained in the Netherlands, working on his two-volume Batak grammar, which was published in 1864 and 1867. He did, however, take up the study of other languages, among them Balinese and Old Javanese or Kawi, and published extensively on the Malay language.

In 1868 he became a correspondent of the Royal Netherlands Academy of Arts and Sciences and returned to the Dutch East-Indies, first travelling to the Lampung region of South Sumatra to write a dictionary of its language. Once more he was struck by illness, and returned to Java in 1869, in passing making a study of the Sundanese (West Javanese) language, and in 1870 left for Bali.

On that island, he set to work on a dictionary of Balinese, only to find that this necessitated a study of Kawi (Old Javanese). This led him to the conclusion that he had better write a trilingual dictionary: of Kawi, Balinese and Dutch. However, NBG was primarily interested in Bible translation, and rather jibed at Van der Tuuk's plans. He therefore decided to resign and became a civil servant in 1873.

In that capacity, he worked on his trilingual dictionary for the rest of his life, and this magnum opus was not to appear before his death. Meanwhile, he was also active in other linguistic activities, such as reworking a dictionary of Malay and a dictionary of Kawi and Modern Javanese. He died, aged 70, in Surabaya.

Van der Tuuk bequeathed his entire collection of manuscripts, scholarly notes, drawings, photographs and books to Leiden University Library.

=== Language command ===
Beside studying a variety of Indonesian languages, he also had extensive command of other tongues, such as Arabic, Tamil, Sanskrit and languages from other parts of South-East Asia. It was rumoured that he was able to learn a dictionary by heart in a matter of days, and to learn a language in a few months.

=== Methods and insights ===
Van der Tuuk's method was twofold. On the one hand, he sought the company of native speakers, and for that reason he had avoided Siboga with its strong Malay influences when he had wished to study the Batak languages instead. For a similar reason, when in Bali, he settled in a village among native inhabitants. In both cases, then, he wished to be among the authentic population. He often availed himself of the services of a native informer, keeping his company, sharing meals, thus garnering any linguistic information he could. He took copious notes, writing them out in the evenings.

On the other hand, he stressed the great importance of written texts as sources of information. This was in line with his view that there was such a thing as “pure language use”. He also held that each and every language was a system in decline, whose pure form could only be discovered through reconstruction.

He more and more inclined to the study of general linguistics. When applying himself to Balinese, he concluded, not unreasonably, that this was only possible in combination with a study of Old Javanese.

=== Van der Tuuk's Laws ===
In his many polemics, Van der Tuuk stated two laws which were named after him.

Van der Tuuk's first Law states that among a number of Indonesian languages, the phonemes /r/, /g/, and /h/ alternate. Thus, pari in one language is equivalent to page in another and to pahe in yet another. urat alternates with ogat and ohat.

Van der Tuuk's second Law states that the phonemes /r/, /d/, and /l/ are likewise interchangeable: pari beside padi and palai, and ron beside daun beside laun.

== Character and views ==
=== Christianity ===
Van der Tuuk has often been alleged to view Christianity unfavourably while at the same time earning his living with missionary activities, and this has led people to believe that his position was less than straightforward. It may be objected to this that he never dissembled his views. Indeed, when Van der Tuuk was considered for the post of NBG missionary translator, Professor Taco Roorda in a letter of recommendation stressed the fact that this candidate was “not a theologian”.

He did, however, view mission as a civilising force, and in addition held the opinion that it would be able to check the advance of Islam. An advisory document to that effect by NBG to the Dutch government was based on a report by Van der Tuuk.

When in the end Van der Tuuk became alienated from missionary activities, this was due to his impossible dilemma. On the one hand, he held a linguistically faithful translation would lead to conflict with missionaries — on the other, shaping the language in accordance with Biblical traditions would raise objections by linguists. Charged with making translations, he was convinced that only thorough previous study of the source language would make this possible. In his day, this was not received wisdom. Many missionaries have published in inadequate Malay, incurring Van der Tuuk's scorn.

=== Conflict ===
Van der Tuuk was caught up in a great many conflicts with his fellow-linguists. He was outspoken and at times even coarsely straightforward. His lifelong rancour against Professor Roorda has become notorious. The latter was a reclusive scholar with linguistic principles diametrically opposed to Van der Tuuk's, and held the incorrect view that Javanese was a kind of basic (Ur-)language which, he claimed, lay at the root of other Indonesian languages.

Van der Tuuk was no less vehement in criticising the faulty Malay often used by those who set themselves up as authorities — a faulty model of the language which, misguidedly, was even presented as a linguistic standard or grammatical model. Controversies such as these were common at a time when new linguistic insights saw the light and when scholars often heaped scorn and invective on their colleagues.

=== Anecdotes ===
At the end of his life, in Bali, Van der Tuuk became an object of curiosity to Europeans. He lived in seclusion from western influences, and it was rumoured that his house was dusty, grimy and disordered. One official wishing to visit him was able to observe him from a distance, sitting on his veranda, holding a piece of Edam cheese. As soon as Van der Tuuk discerned his would-be visitor, he gestured as if to fend the visitor off, exclaiming, “I'm not at home!”

Another version of the same story relates that any visitor was presented with refreshments from a tin containing all kinds of cheese parings, and that declining the offer would incur Van der Tuuk's everlasting enmity. This, however, is held to be an apocryphal story which may have been inspired by the above anecdote.

At the same time, the Balinese respected him greatly. He had made such a thorough study of their customs and habits that one of their elders noted that “if we are faced with a problem, we consult with Tuan Dertik [Mr Van der Tuuk]”.

== Select bibliography ==
=== Primary ===
- 1861 — Bataksch-Nederduitsch woordenboek; Amsterdam, Muller (“A Batak-Dutch Dictionary”).
- 1864 — Tobasche spraakkunst, eerste stuk; Amsterdam, Muller (“A Toba-Batak Grammar, Part 1”).
- 1866 — Hikajat Pandja-tandaran; Tamilsche omwerking van het Indische fabelboek: de Pantja-Tantra, vermaleischt door Abdullah ben Abdilquadir bijgenaamd 'de Munsji' (de Tolk). Uitgegeven en met aanteekeningen voorzien door H.N. van der Tuuk; Leiden, Brill (an edition of the Malay version Sanskrit Panchatantra stories translated into Tamil).
- 1864 — Tobasche spraakkunst, tweede stuk; Amsterdam, Nederlandsch Bijbelgenootschap (“A Toba-Batak Grammar, Part 2”).
- 1897-1912 — Kawi-Balineesch-Nederlandsch woordenboek; Batavia, Landsdrukkerij, 4 dln (in 1971 uitgebracht in Engelse vertaling, red. A. Teeuw en R. Roolvink) (“A Kawi-Balinese-Dutch Dictionary”; English reprint in 1971).

=== Secondary ===
- Grijns, C.D. “Van der Tuuk and the Study of Malay”. In BKI 152[1996]-3:353-381.
- Groeneboer, Kees. Een vorst onder de taalgeleerden. Herman Neubronner van der Tuuk. Afgevaardigde voor Indië van het Nederlandsch Bijbelgenootschap 1847-1873. Leiden, KITLV, 2002 (on Van der Tuuk's activities as a missionary translator).
- Ngajenan, Drs Mohamad. Kamus Etimologi Bahasa Indonesia. Semarang, Dahara Prize, 1992^{3} (“An Indonesian Etymological Dictionary”).
- Nieuwenhuys, Rob. “Van der Tuuk”. In Tussen twee vaderlanden. Amsterdam, Van Oorschot, 1988^{3}, pag. 85-158 (an essay).
- Saussure, Ferdinand de. Course in General Linguistics (transl. Wade Baskin), London, Fontana, 1974 [1959].
