= Bible translations into Malay =

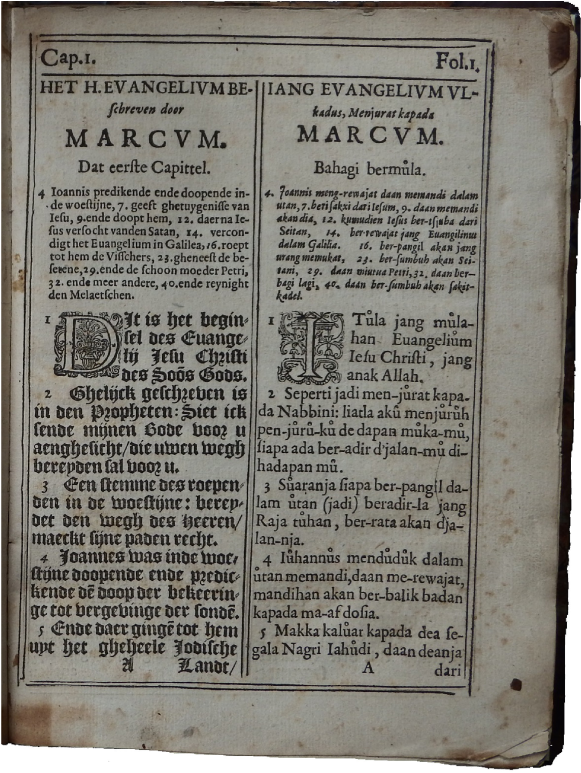
Only extant copy of the 1629 first edition of Ruyl's translation of the Gospel of Mark in Malay from the Lincoln Cathedral Library

Bible translations into Malay include translations of the whole or parts of the Bible into any of the levels and varieties of the Malay language. Publication of early or partial translations began as early as the seventeenth century although there is evidence that the Jesuit missionary, Francis Xavier, translated religious texts that included Bible verses into Malay as early as the sixteenth century.

The Protestant Reformation saw the rise in interest in vernacular translations of the Bible in Europe. By the sixteenth century, Protestant European nations like the Dutch Republic and England had begun to encroach into the traditional realms of influence of the Catholic Portuguese in the Malay Archipelago. With the Dutch domination of the East Indies, where Malay was the lingua franca of trade, the translation of the Bible into Malay was one of the first extant translations of the Bible in a language that wasn't from Europe or the Middle East.

Developments in the translation of the Bible into Malay revolved and continues to revolve around three considerations including establishing the standards of the Malay language, including rules of grammar, vocabulary and spelling; discovering appropriate ways of using Malay to communicate Christian concepts within the Malay culture; and catering for the target groups of the translation work and means of dissemination. One of the most pressing practical issues concerns the use of loan-words from Arabic and Persian which entered the Malay vocabulary through the Islamisation of the Malay people and this issue remains a politically and socially sensitive issue in Malaysia where Malay is the national language and Islam the official religion.

== Classical Malay (17th to 18th century) ==
The period of Classical Malay started when Islam gained its foothold in the region and the elevation of its status to a state religion in many of the Malay kingdoms of the Malay Archipelago. As a result of Islamisation and growth in trade with the Muslim world, this era witnessed the penetration of Arabic and Persian vocabulary into Malay.

=== First era of Bible translation ===
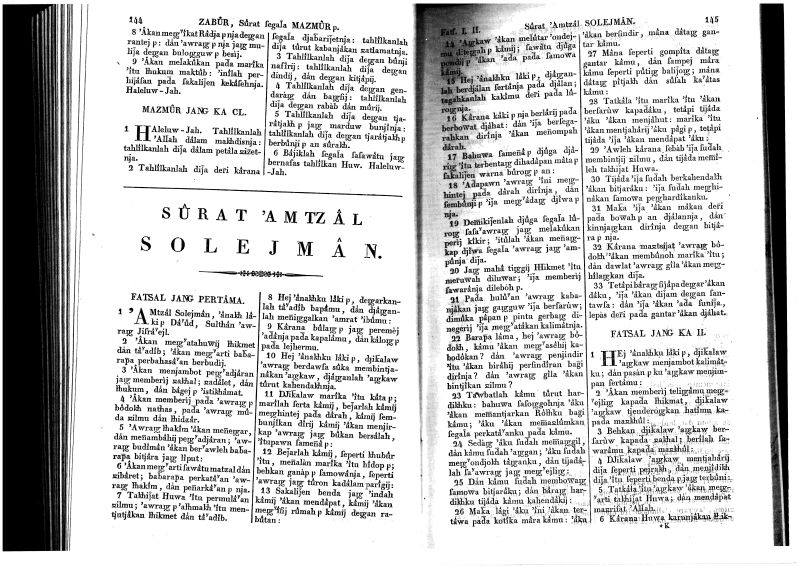
Leydekker's Malay translation open to the first page of Psalms (1733)

The first systematic attempt to translate the Bible into Malay was by a Dutch trader of the Dutch East India Company (VOC), Albert Cornelius Ruyl, who finished his translation of the Gospel of Matthew in 1612. The translation was published in 1629 in Enkhuizen in the form of a Malay-Dutch diglot which also included translations of the Ten Commandments, the Benedictus, the Greater Doxology, the Magnificat, the Nunc dimittis, the Apostles Creed, the Lord's Prayer, and a few other liturgical prayers and canticles.

This was followed by the publication of his translation of the Gospel of Mark together with his earlier translation of Matthew in a single volume in 1638. Contemporary translations of the Gospel of John and the Gospel of Luke was being done by a VOC officer named Jan Van Hasel while a translation of the Acts of the Apostles was being done by the chaplain of Batavia, Justus Heurnius. In 1651, all these translations were revised by Heurnius and published as a single volume in Amsterdam.

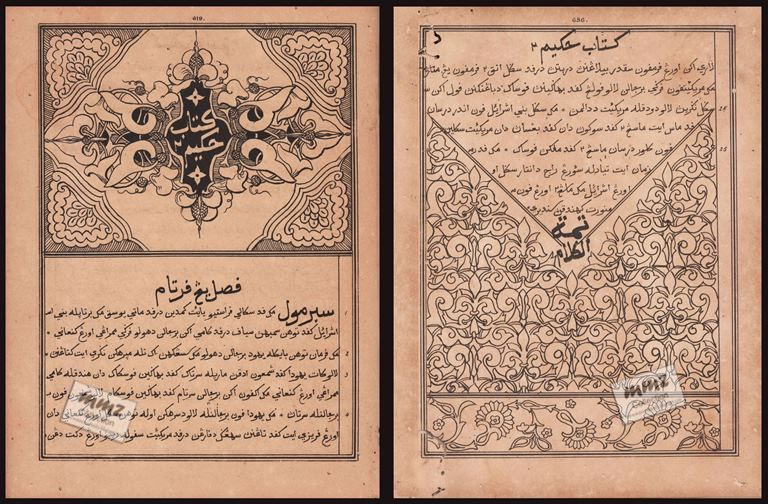
Leydekker's Malay translation of the Book of Judges in the Jawi script (1733)

The complete New Testament was translated by Daniel Brouwerious, a pastor in Batavia and published as a diglot in 1668 in Amsterdam. The use of many transliterated Portuguese terms like Baptismo (Baptism), Crus (Cross), Deos (God), Euangelio (Gospel), and Spirito Sancto (Holy Spirit) meant that this translation remained inaccessible to native speakers of the Malay language except for the Catholic Malays that have earlier been converted by the Portuguese.

The first complete translation of the Bible in Malay was begun by Melchior Leydekker on the order of the church authorities in Batavia and was officially sponsored by the VOC from 1691. Melchior had just completed translating about 90% of the Bible when he died in 1701 and the work was completed by the Rev Peter van der Vorm the same year. The Bible was only published in 1733 as its publication was delayed by the Rev Francois Valentijn while he completed his translation in the Moluccas dialect of Malay. Valentijn's translation was, however, rejected by the VOC due to it being in a regional dialect of Malay and a direct translation of the Dutch Statenvertaling rather than from the Hebrew and Greek.

Leydekker's translation was criticised for its heavy use of Arabic and Persian loanwords and was specifically criticised by Munshi Abdullah for its poor use of grammar and idioms. Nonetheless, it remained the standard translation used in the Dutch East Indies until 1916 and in both British Malaya and British Borneo until 1853. Apart from the catechisms and prayer books translated by the Roman Catholics, all of the earliest translations of the Bible in the Malay language originating from the East Indies were first printed in the Latin script before being republished in the Jawi script commonly used by the local Malays. The first translation that was first published in Jawi did not happen until 1912.

=== List of Bible translations in classical Malay ===
Year	Translation	Style	Notes
1629	Ruyl	High Malay	Gospel of Matthew
1638	Ruyl	High Malay	Gospel of Mark
1651	Heurnius & Van Hasel	High Malay	The Four Gospels (including Ruyl's translations) and the Acts of the Apostles
1668	Brouwerius' New Testament	High Malay	Complete translation of the New Testament by Daniel Brouwerius, a pastor in Batavia
1677	Valentijn's Translation	Low Malay	Complete translation of the Bible in Moluccan dialect. Rejected by the VOC for publication
1733	Leydekker's Translation	High Malay	First published complete translation of the Bible in Malay. It was originally published in Latin script and later republished in Jawi script in 1758

== Pre-Modern Malay (19th century) ==
The nineteenth century was the period of strong Western political and commercial domination in Southeast Asia. Partially as a result of the Batavian Revolution and the Napoleonic Wars in Europe, the Dutch no longer held a dominant position in the region and British influence was increasingly present with the establishment of several colonies and protectorates in the Malay peninsula and Borneo.

The Dutch and British colonists, realising the importance in understanding the local languages and cultures particularly Malay, began establishing various centres of linguistic, literature and cultural studies in universities like Leiden and London. Thousands of Malay manuscripts as well as other historical artefacts of Malay culture were collected and studied. The use of Latin script began to expand in the fields of administration and education whereby the influence of English and Dutch literatures and languages started to penetrate and spread gradually into the Malay language.

At the same time, the technological development in printing method that enabled mass production at low prices increased the activities of authorship for general reading in the Malay language, a development that would later shift away Malay literature from its traditional position in Malay courts. Munshi Abdullah, a prolific writer and pioneer of the factual journalistic style of writing in Malay literature, marks an early stage in the transition from the classical to modern literature, taking Malay literature out of its preoccupation with folk-stories and legends into accurate historical descriptions.

=== Second era of Bible translation ===
It was in this period that the Anglican chaplain of the British Settlement of Penang, the Rev Robert Sparke Hutchings, attempted to correct Leydekker's translation. He and his colleague, J. McGinnis, found over 10,000 words not found in William Marsden's Grammar and Dictionary of the Malay Language. The revised translation of the New Testament was published in Serampore, India in 1817 and the Old Testament in 1821 by the British and Foreign Bible Society or BFBS. This translation did not appear to have been widely distributed outside of Penang.

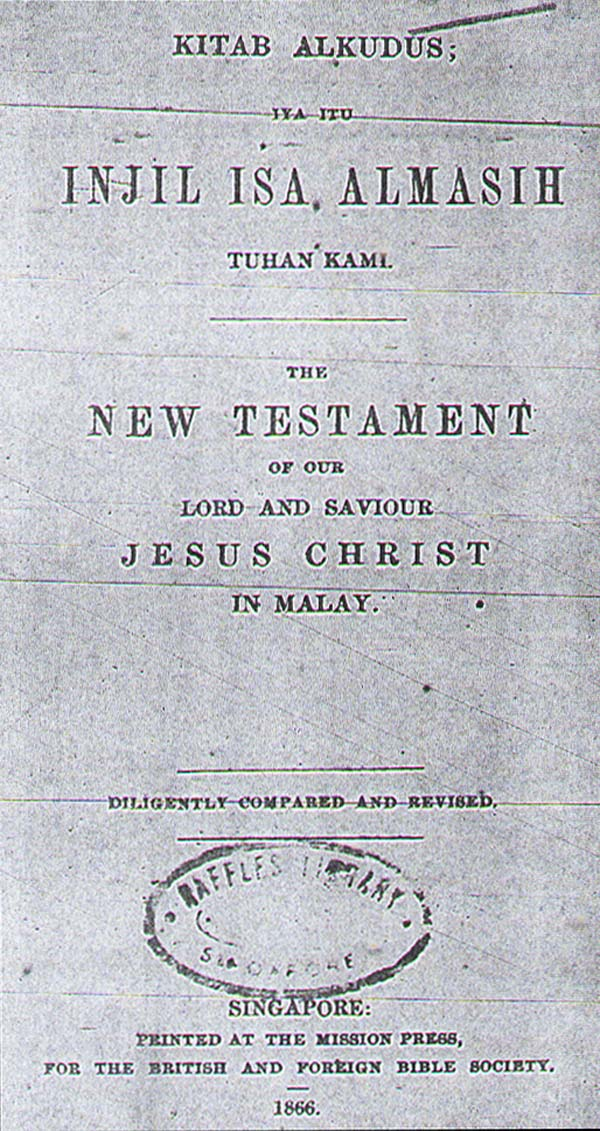
Keasberry's Malay translation of the New Testament (1852)

While awaiting permission to enter China, the London Missionary Society (LMS) established a mission station in Malacca. Pioneered by William Milne, Malacca was deemed suitable due to its location on the ordinary trade routes to China as well as having a sizable Chinese population. Aware of Munshi Abdullah's criticism of the Leydekker translation, the LMS sent Claudius Henry Thomsen in 1815 with the specific assignment to work among the Malay people. He became a close friend and student of Munshi Abdullah and from 1818 to 1832 undertook the task to revise Leydekker's translation of the Gospels and with the help of Robert Burns, the chaplain of Singapore, the Acts of the Apostles with what the language skills he learnt from Munshi Abdullah.

Despite their close cooperation in the revision, Munshi Abdullah remained dissatisfied with the work, partially due to the religious vocabulary used — like "Kerajaan Surga" (Kingdom of Heaven), "Mulut Allah" (Word of God), "Anak Allah" (Son of God) and "Bapa-ku yang ada di Surga" (My Father, who art in Heaven) — that may have offended his Muslim sensibilities. The challenge of expressing Christian concepts in terms that are faithful to Malay idiom yet inoffensive to the Malay Muslim community remains to the present day.

Revision of the Thomsen and Burns translation was undertaken almost immediately after Thomsen left Malaya in 1832 by John Stronach of the American Board of Commissioners for Foreign Missions on the instruction of James Legge, the missionary in charge of the LMS work in Malacca, in view of publishing a second edition of the Malay New Testament. This endeavour did not come into fruition as there was concern by the directors of the LMS on the close involvement of a Muslim, Munshi Abdullah, in the translation. The opening of China to missionaries in 1842 after the signing of the Treaty of Nanking also saw the sudden exodus of LMS missionaries from the Straits Settlements to China, which was their original destination.

The closure of the LMS mission in the Straits Settlements in 1847 left the work of translating the Bible in British Malaya solely in the hands of Benjamin Keasberry and his long time language teacher, Munshi Abdullah. Keasberry, a LMS missionary himself, chose to stay behind as an independent missionary after the closure of the LMS mission. While his translation work was no longer financially supported by the LMS, he did receive some financial support from the BFBS. A complete New Testament was published in 1852 in the Latin script and in 1856, a Jawi edition was published as well. This translation became the main translation used not just in the Malay peninsula, but also in Sumatra and Borneo for the next few decades.

While Keasberry managed to complete the translation of some books of the Old Testament, they were never published and his death in 1875 ended any extensive work on Christian literature in the Malay language in the Malay peninsula until the close of the century.

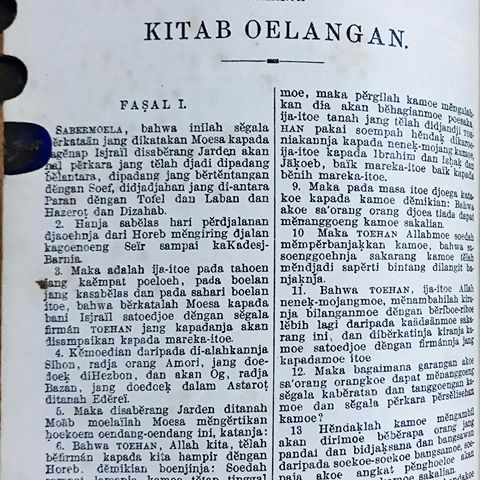
Book of Deuteronomy - Klinkert's Malay translation of the Bible (1879)

Meanwhile in the Dutch East Indies, a German missionary working in Surabaya, Johannes Emde, published a revision of Leydekker's translation into the local dialect in 1835. This translation is considered to be the first widely distributed translation in Low Malay. Valentijn's earlier translation in the Moluccas dialect of Low Malay in 1677 was rejected by the VOC who then had a monopoly on religious instruction and publication in the East Indies and was never published.

Another noteworthy translation into Ambonese Malay was done by Bernhard Nikolaas Johann Roskott (1811-1873), who was a Dutch missionary in Ambon, in what is now Indonesia. His translation in the Ambon dialect was completed and published in 1877 by the National Bible Society of Scotland (now the Scottish Bible Society). His New Testament was revised by H.C. Klinkert in 1883 and published by the National Bible Society of Scotland. In the 1931 the Gospel of John from this New Testament was republished by Scripture Gift Mission and the National Bible Society of Scotland.

Around the time Keasberry was completing his New Testament translation, a Dutch Mennonite minister in Semarang, Cornelius Klinkert, was working on his own revision of the Leydekker translation. Klinkert, who was married to a local woman, found that his wife was unable to understand the Leydekker translation that was written in literary Malay. In 1863, he published a complete New Testament in the Semarang dialect.

Because of Klinkert's familiarity with the various regional dialects of Malay as well as literary Malay, he was commissioned in the same year by the Nederlands Bijbelgenootschap or NBG (Netherlands Bible Society) to complete a full translation of the Bible in literary Malay for the common use in both British Malaya and the Dutch East Indies. His translation of the New Testament was completed and published in 1870 and the complete Bible published in 1879.

Klinkert's translation, however, continued to receive criticism particularly from missionaries in the Malay Peninsula. Many felt that the translation was heavily influenced by the dialect of Minahasa and was not readily understandable by readers in the peninsula.

=== List of Bible translations in pre-modern Malay ===
Year	Translation	Style	Notes
1817	Hutchings	High Malay	Revision of Leydekker's translation of the New Testament.
1821	Hutchings	High Malay	Revision of Leydekker's translation of the Old Testament.
1821	Thomsen	High Malay	Translation of the Matthew.
1832	Thomsen & Burns	High Malay	Translation of the Four Gospels and the Acts of the Apostles.
1835	Emde's New Testament	Low Malay	Translation of the New Testament and Psalms in the Surabaya dialect.
1852	Keasberry's New Testament	High Malay	Translation of the New Testament. Originally published in Latin script and later republished in Jawi script in 1856.
1863	Klinkert's New Testament	Low Malay	Translation of the New Testament in the Semarang dialect.
1863	Roskott's New Testament	Low Malay	Translation of the New Testament in the Ambon dialect.
1879	Klinkert's Translation	High Malay	Complete translation of the Bible.

== Modern Malay (From the 20th century) ==
The flourishing of pre-modern Malay literature in 19th century led to the rise of intellectual movement among the locals and the emergence of new community of Malay linguists. The appreciation of language grew and various efforts were undertaken by the community to further enhance the usage of Malay as well as to improve its abilities in facing the challenging modern era. Among the efforts done was the planning of a corpus for Malay language, first initiated by Pakatan Belajar-Mengajar Pengetahuan Bahasa (Society for the Learning and Teaching of Linguistic Knowledge), established in 1888.

The establishment of Sultan Idris Training College (SITC) in Tanjung Malim in 1922 intensified these efforts. In 1936, Za'ba, an outstanding Malay scholar and lecturer of SITC, produced a Malay grammar book series entitled Pelita Bahasa that modernised the structure of the Classical Malay language and became the basis for the Malay language that is in use today.

The adoption of the Malay language as the national language designate for an independent Indonesia by nationalists in the 1926 Sumpah Pemuda and the adoption of the Malay language as the national languages of Malaya (later Malaysia), Singapore, and Brunei upon their respective independence from colonialism meant that the syntax and vocabulary of the Malay language continued to evolve rapidly during this period.

Due to the different colonial as well as local idiomatic and cultural influences on the territories that eventually became the independent nations of Indonesia, Malaysia, Singapore and Brunei, the Malay language evolved somewhat differently in the Dutch and British controlled areas of the Malay archipelago. Two different spelling orthographies in the Latin script developed in both the Dutch East Indies and British Malaya (including British North Borneo and Sarawak) influenced by the spelling orthographies of their respective colonial languages. In 1901, the Van Ophuijsen Spelling System became the standard spelling for Malay in the Dutch East Indies while the Wilkinson Spelling System became standard in British Malaya in 1902. This divergence remained despite further evolution and adoption of different standardised spelling systems in the two regions until 1972 when the spelling orthography was standardised in both Malaysia and Indonesia as the New Rumi Spelling and Enhanced Indonesian Spelling System respectively.

=== Third era of Bible translation ===
As a result of these developments, it became increasingly difficult to develop a common Malay language Bible for both these regions. Different social and political developments post-independence also contributed to this difficulty. Although a common translation was still in use up until the 1970s, translation work had begun to diverge into two independent, if related enterprises, as early as the turn of the 20th century.

In 1890, the Anglican Bishop of Labuan, Sarawak and Singapore, George Hose, had written to the BFBS saying that even Keasberry's translation needed to be revised to make it more accessible

"for Eurasians, Chinese, Klings (sic), etc. A simple but grammatical style, such as people of the upper classes use colloquially was wanted.

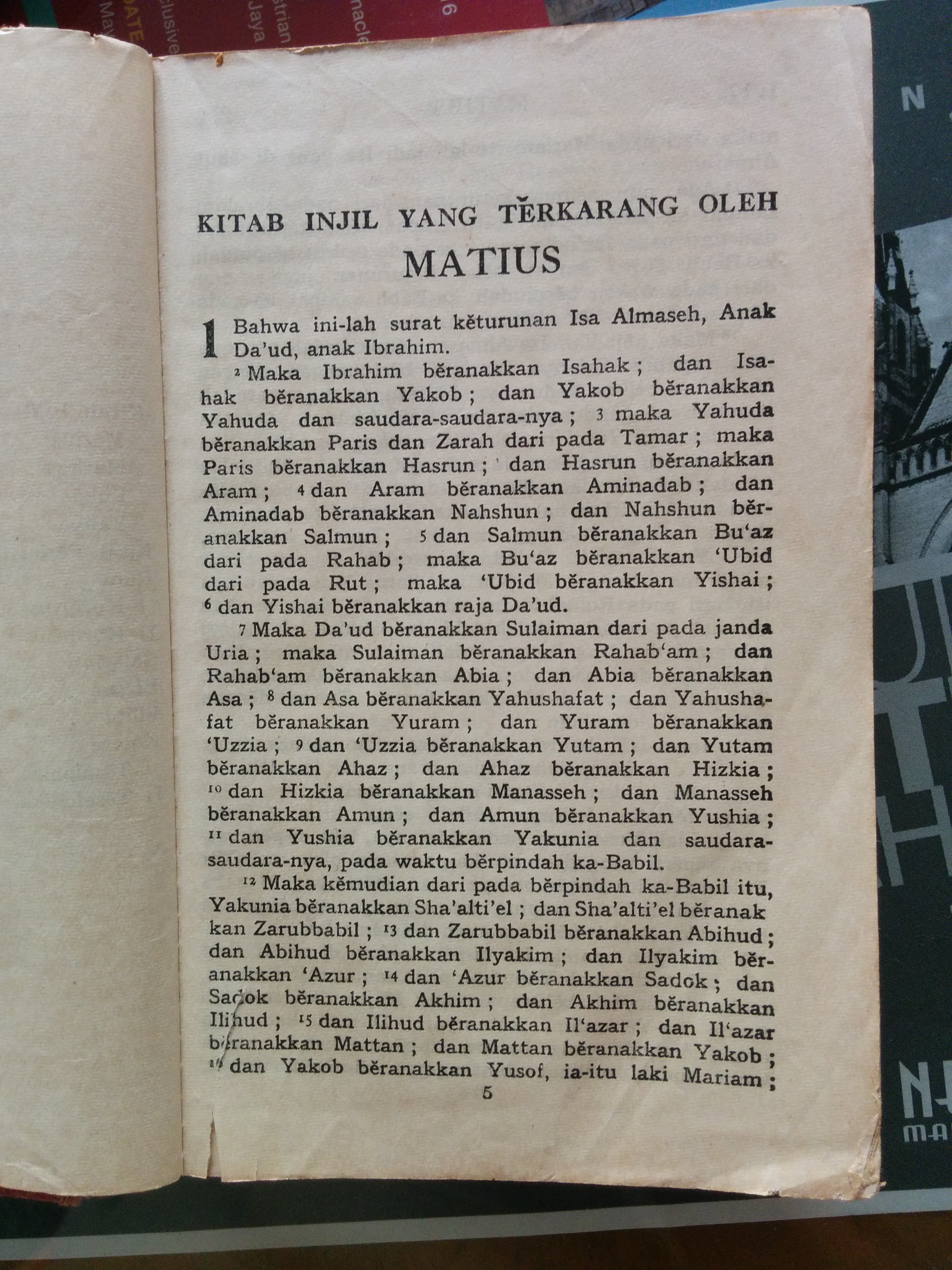
Gospel of Matthew. 1912 Shellabear Malay Translation of the New Testament (1949 Reprint)

A revision committee was set up consisting of Bishop Hose, W. H. Gomes of the Society for the Propagation of the Gospel and a Methodist missionary, William Shellabear. Progress was slow and by 1897, only the Gospel of Matthew was fully translated and published. In 1899, Shellabear was appointed chief reviser by the BFBS and assigned to work full time to complete a new Malay translation of the New Testament.

Shellabear's work was aided by Bishop Hose as well as Muhammad Ibrahim Munsyi, the son of Munshi Abdullah who also served as a scribe in the court of the Sultan of Johore. In 1904, the translation of the New Testament was completed and by 1909 the translation of the Old Testament was also complete. Both were published in a single volume in Jawi in 1912.

The translation work was mired by occasionally acrimonious disputes between the various parties that had an interest in the publication of the Bible; the BFBS, NBG, the Methodist Publishing House (formerly the Mission Press established by Shellabear), the Anglican Church and the British administration. The primary dispute between the Bible Societies and the Methodists was over pay, compensation and finances borne by Shellabear.

Another dispute that threatened to delay the publication of the new translation was on the Romanised spelling orthography to be used. The British administration had introduced a standardised Romanised spelling for the Malay language in 1902 and the BFBS with the support of Bishop Hose wanted to use it. This was not favoured by the missionaries and Shellabear himself who preferred to use the spelling standard established by the Mission Press and had been used to educate children in the mission schools as well as the bulk of printed Malay literature, both Christian and secular, at that time. A compromise was finally reached where it was agreed that both versions would be printed by the BFBS and the Methodist Publishing House respectively and sold at the same price.

A more long running dispute was on the need to have the Old Testament translated. In 1905, the BFBS decided to prepare a revision of Klinkert's Old Testament. This was initially agreed to by the NBG but was opposed by the latter's agent in Batavia, L. J. van Wijk, initially over how it would affect the sale of unsold stock of the Leydekker and Klinkert Bibles. The argument eventually revolved on the suitability of the Dutch East Indies translated versions for use in the Malay Peninsula, both from a linguistic and Romanised spelling perspective. Only the Leydekker translation was available in Jawi in which the spelling for Malay was more consistent in both regions and the linguistic unsuitability of that version for use in the Malay Peninsula had long been accepted by the BFBS. Shellabear eventually proceeded with his translation which was completed in 1909 and published in 1912 over the protests of the NBG. Only the Jawi script edition of the Old Testament was ever published and by 1913 a Baba Malay translation had been completed with the help of a local Christian, Chew Ching Yong, and published.

In 1924, the BFBS and the NBG began discussions on the need for a new editions of the Bible as well as more unified work in publication. An agreement was reached in 1929 between the BFBS, the National Bible Society of Scotland, and the NBG to establish a translation team under the German missionary, Werner Bode, to prepare a revised translation of the Bible. The Leydekker, Klinkert, and Shellabear translations was to be consulted and used as the basis for the new revision. Notably the translation team included locals and non-Christians like Ehe Mashor, a Perak native who had helped Shellabear with his Malay-English dictionary as well as natives of Ambon and Minahasa.

Despite the large and diverse team, the translation work was delayed, primarily due to the criticisms of Shellabear. He was partial to a translation that used the Johore-Riau dialect which he regarded as pure Malay. He was also adamant on the use of language that would appeal to Muslims, insisting on the use of Isa Al-Masih for Jesus Christ instead of Yesus Kristus that was commonly used in the translations from the Dutch East Indies. The BFBS considered withdrawing from the project despite positive comments received from officials such as Richard Olaf Winstedt and Harold Cheeseman. The BFBS eventually decided to continue with the partnership but also continued to publish Shellabear's translation in the Malay peninsula.

Bode's work was never completed with only the New Testament being completed and published in 1938. The translation of the Old Testament was only partially completed when the Second World War broke out. As a German national, Bode was interred by the Dutch authorities and the ship carrying him to Britain from India was sunk by the Japanese resulting in the loss of a partial set of translated Old Testament manuscripts. Mrs Bode had the draft translation of the books of Genesis through Ruth and the Psalms. The translation of the book of Psalms was published in 1947.

The Lembaga Alkitab Indonesia (Indonesian Bible Society) was established in 1950 and republished Bode's New Testament together with Klinkert's Old Testament in a single volume known today as the Alkitab Terjemahan Lama (The Old Translation Bible) as a stop-gap measure until a new translation could be prepared. This was the last Malay Bible that saw common use throughout the Malay Archipelago as post-colonial developments drew the Malay language simultaneously closer and apart at the same time.

=== Fourth era of Bible translation ===
After Malaya became independent in 1957, a radical transformation occurred in the use of Malay in Christian literature. The original thrust had been two-fold, to work amongst the Peranakan Chinese and the Malays. The former had no longer become dependent on Baba Malay literature as the younger generation started becoming more conversant in English while legal and social considerations had essentially halted evangelistic work amongst the Malays, especially in Malaya (and to a lesser extent in Singapore).

The emphasis shifted from providing literature in the Malay language to one that would provide literature in the Malaysian language, a standardised form of Malay in Malaysia, for future generations who would be educated in the language. The Malay Language Committee of the BFBS auxiliary in Singapore was phased out in the 1960s and was replaced by the National Language Committee. The BFBS auxiliary in Singapore was re-constituted as the Bible Society of Singapore, Malaysia and Brunei (BSSMB) in 1969 and continued the work of the BFBS.

In 1970, the BSSMB initiated a new translation based on the principle of dynamic equivalence led by the Rev E. T. Suwito. The New Testament was completed and published in 1974 with a revised edition published in 1976. At the same time, work was begun on translating the Old Testament using the same translation principle and was completed in 1981. Both the Old Testament and the New Testament was published in a single volume known as the Alkitab Berita Baik (Today's Malay Version) or TMV in 1987 by the BSSMB.

The Bible Society of Malaysia or BSM which was re-constituted from the Malaysian auxiliary of the BSSMB was formed in 1986 and took over the responsibility of the publishing of the Malay Bible. In 1990, the TMV was revised again with the New Testament and Psalms being published in 1995 and the whole Bible in 1996.

In 1998, a group of translators and linguists started working on a formal equivalence Malay translation of the Bible. In 2015, representatives from the National Evangelical Christian Fellowship, the Methodist Church in Malaysia, the Sidang Injil Borneo and other Christian churches formed the Literature and Bible Network or LAB Network to publish and distribute the new completed translation known as the Alkitab Versi Borneo (transl. Borneo Version Bible or AVB).

An Alkitab Bahasa Malaysia Translation Workshop was held by the BSM in 2011 in preparation for the translation of a formal equivalence Malay translation of the Bible. During the workshop a draft translation of the Epistle to Philemon and the Second Epistle of John was completed. The New Testament was launched on 27 April 2019 and the whole Bible the following year. The new translation will be known as the Alkitab Suci (transl. Holy Bible). The full Bible was launched with the name Alkitab Kudus Malaysia in three locations: PJ Evangelical Free Church in Petaling Jaya, All Saints' Cathedral in Kota Kinabalu, and Trinity Methodist Church in Kuching. All three launchings have been attended by representatives of ecumenical bodies such as Council of Churches of Malaysia, Sabah Council of Churches, and Association of Churches Sarawak.

==== Non-ecumenical translations ====
Apart from the ecumenical translations of the Bible that is accepted by mainstream Christianity in Malaysia and Singapore, there have been other translations into Malay of the Bible that are used by non-mainstream Christian groups.

The more notable ones are the Kitab Suci Terjemahan Dunia Baru which is a translation of the Jehovah Witnesses' New World Translation of the Holy Scriptures and the Alkitab Versi Pemulihan which is a translation of Living Stream Ministry's Recovery Version used by the Local Church Movement.

=== List of Bible translations in modern Malay ===
Year	Translation	Style	Notes
1912	Shellabear's Translation	Low Malay	Complete translation of the Bible (NT 1904, OT 1909). It was originally published in Jawi script and the New Testament later republished in Latin script in 1929.
1913	Shellabear's Baba Malay New Testament	Baba Malay	Complete translation of the New Testament in the Baba Malay dialect.
1938	Bode's New Testament	Standard Malay	Complete translation of the New Testament. Work on the Old Testament was interrupted by the Second World War and mostly lost.
1958	Alkitab Terjemahan Lama	Standard Malay	A compilation of Klinkert's Old Testament and Bode's New Testament. This was the last Bible translation in the Malay language that saw common use in the newly independent states of Malaya and Indonesia.
1974	Perjanjian Baharu (TMV)	Malaysian Malay	A new translation of the New Testament using the principle of dynamic equivalence published by the Bible Society of Singapore, Malaysia and Brunei (BSMSB).
1987	Alkitab Berita Baik (TMV)	Malaysian Malay	The revised 1974 New Testament translation together with the newly completed Old Testament translation by the BSMSB.
2016	Alkitab Versi Borneo (AVB)	Malaysian Malay	The first ecumenical formal translation of the Bible in the Malaysian language published by the LAB Network.
2019	Alkitab Suci	Malaysian Malay	An ecumenical formal translation of the Bible in Bahasa Malaysia published by the Bible Society of Malaysia.
2024	Alkitab Berita Baik Edisi Studi	Malaysian Malay	The first Malaysian Malay Study Bible published by the Bible Society of Malaysia.
2024	Alkitab Kudus Malaysia (AKM)	Malaysian Malay	The formal translation of the Bible in Malay, incorporating textual and exegetical updates from the Indonesian Terjemahan Baru Edisi Kedua (TB2). The New Testament of Alkitab Suci together with the completed Old Testament by the Bible Society of Malaysia.

== Comparison of translations ==
=== The Lord's Prayer ===
A comparison of the translations of the Lord's Prayer (Matthew 6:9-13) from the four historical eras of Bible translation into Malay:

The Lord's Prayer (Matthew 6:9-13)
Ruyl's Translation (1629)	Keasberry's Translation (1852)
Bappa kita, jang berdudok kadalam surga : bermumin menjadi akan namma-mu. Radjat-mu mendatang kahendak-mu menjadi di atas bumi seperti di dalam surga. Berila kita makannanku sedekala hari. Makka ber-ampunla pada-kita doosa kita, seperti kita ber-ampun akan siapa ber-sala kapada kita. D'jang-an hentar kita kapada setana seitan, tetapi muhoon-la kita dari pada iblis	Ayah kami yang ada dishorga, turmulialah kiranya namamu; Luaslah kiranya krajaanmu, kahadakmu burlakulah diatas bumi ini spurti dalam shorga; Brilah kiranya akan kami pada hari ini ruzki yang chukop; Dan ampunilah kiranya sagala salah kami spurti kami mungampuni kasalahan orang lain pada kami; Maka janganlah kiranya masokkan kami kadalam purchobaan, mulainkan lupaskanlah kami deripada yang jahat
Shellabear's Translation (1912)	Alkitab Versi Borneo (2016)
Ya Bapa kami yang disurga, terhormatlah kiranya namamu. Datanglah kerajaanmu. Jadilah kehendakmu diatas bumi seperti disurga. Berilah akan kami pada hari ini makanan kami yang sehari-harian. Maka ampunkanlah hutang-hutang kami seperti kami sudah mengampuni orang yang berhutang pada kami. Janganlah membawa kami masuk pencobaan melainkan lepaskanlah kami dari pada yang jahat.	Ya Bapa kami yang di syurga, Sucilah Nama-Mu. Datanglah kerajaan-Mu. Terlaksanalah kehendak-Mu di bumi sebagaimana di syurga. Berilah kami makanan untuk hari ini. Ampunkanlah kesalahan kami sebagaimana kami mengampuni mereka yang bersalah terhadap kami. Janganlah biarkan kami tergoda, Selamatkanlah kami daripada yang jahat
Alkitab Kudus Malaysia (2024)	
Bapa kami yang di syurga, dikuduskanlah nama-Mu. Datanglah Kerajaan-Mu, jadilah kehendak-Mu di bumi seperti di syurga. Berilah kami pada hari ini makanan kami yang secukupnya dan ampunilah kami akan kesalahan kami, seperti kami juga mengampuni orang yang bersalah terhadap kami; dan janganlah membawa kami ke dalam pencubaan, tetapi lepaskan kami dari yang jahat. [Kerana Engkaulah yang punya Kerajaan dan kuasa dan kemuliaan sampai selama-lamanya. Amin.]	

=== John 3:16 ===
John 3:16 in the major modern Malay translations of the Bible compared to the original Greek and modern English translations:

Distinctives	Version	Text
Dynamic Equivalence	Alkitab Berita Baik (1996)	Allah sangat mengasihi orang di dunia ini sehingga Dia memberikan Anak-Nya yang tunggal, supaya setiap orang yang percaya kepada Anak itu tidak binasa tetapi beroleh hidup sejati dan kekal.
Formal Equivalence	Alkitab Versi Borneo (2016)	Allah begitu mengasihi dunia sehingga menganugerahkan Anak-Nya yang tunggal supaya setiap orang yang percaya kepada-Nya tidak binasa melainkan mendapat hidup kekal.
Formal Equivalence	Alkitab Kudus Malaysia (2024)	Kerana begitu besar kasih Allah akan dunia ini, sehingga Dia mengurniakan Anak-Nya yang tunggal, supaya setiap orang yang percaya kepada-Nya tidak binasa, melainkan beroleh kehidupan yang kekal.
Original Koine Greek	Novum Testamentum Graece	οὕτως γὰρ ἠγάπησεν ὁ θεὸς τὸν κόσμον, ὥστε τὸν υἱὸν τὸν μονογενῆ ἔδωκεν, ἵνα πᾶς ὁ πιστεύων εἰς αὐτὸν μὴ ἀπόληται ἀλλ᾽ ἔχῃ ζωὴν αἰώνιον. Houtōs gar ēgapēsen ho theos ton kosmon, hōste ton huion ton monogenē edōken, hina pas ho pisteuōn eis auton mē apolētai all᾽ echē zōēn aiōnion.
Formal Equivalence English	New International Version (2011)	For God so loved the world that he gave his one and only Son, that whoever believes in him shall not perish but have eternal life.

== See also ==
- Bible translations into the languages of Indonesia and Malaysia
- List of Bible translations by language
- Christianity in Malaysia
- British and Foreign Bible Society
- Netherlands Bible Society
