= Drebrin-like =

Protein-coding gene in the species Homo sapiens

DBNL

Identifiers
- Aliases: DBNL, ABP1, HIP-55, HIP55, SH3P7, Drebrin-like, drebrin like
- External IDs: OMIM: 610106; MGI: 700006; GeneCards: DBNL
Available structures
PDB	Ortholog search: PDBe RCSB
PDB	List of PDB id codes 1X67

Gene location (Human)
Chr.	Chromosome 7 (human)
Band	7p13	Start	44,044,640 bp
Band	7p13	End	44,069,456 bp

Gene location (Mouse)
Chr.	Chromosome 11 (mouse)
Band	11 A1|11 3.87 cM	Start	5,738,488 bp
Band	11 A1|11 3.87 cM	End	5,750,962 bp
RNA expression pattern
Bgee	Human / Mouse (ortholog); Top expressed in: monocyte; granulocyte; appendix; spleen; mucosa of transverse colon; stromal cell of endometrium; gallbladder; left coronary artery; ectocervix; right coronary artery / Top expressed in: Ileal epithelium; granulocyte; lens; lip; genital tubercle; esophagus; mesenteric lymph nodes; transitional epithelium of urinary bladder; neural tube; dentate gyrus of hippocampal formation granule cell; More reference expression data
BioGPS	n/a
Gene ontology
Molecular function	protein domain specific binding; protein C-terminus binding; protein binding; enzyme activator activity; actin filament binding; actin binding; cadherin binding
Cellular component	endosome; Golgi apparatus; cell projection; postsynaptic density; membrane; Golgi membrane; plasma membrane; synapse; intracellular anatomical structure; cell junction; dendrite; early endosome; clathrin-coated vesicle membrane; extracellular exosome; cytoskeleton; cytoplasmic vesicle; podosome; lamellipodium; cytoplasm; ruffle; cell cortex; cytosol; extracellular region; secretory granule lumen; tertiary granule lumen; ficolin-1-rich granule lumen
Biological process	endocytosis; adaptive immune response; immune system process; synapse assembly; neuron projection morphogenesis; podosome assembly; Rac protein signal transduction; neutrophil degranulation; receptor-mediated endocytosis; ruffle assembly; transport
Sources:Amigo / QuickGO
Orthologs
Databases	NCBI: entry; OMA: entry
Species	Human	Mouse
Entrez	28988	13169
Ensembl	ENSG00000136279	ENSMUSG00000020476
UniProt	Q9UJU6	Q62418
RefSeq (mRNA)	NM_001014436; NM_001122956; NM_001284313; NM_001284315; NM_014063 NM_001362723	NM_001146308; NM_001146309; NM_013810
RefSeq (protein)	NP_001014436; NP_001116428; NP_001271242; NP_001271244; NP_054782 NP_001349652	NP_001139780; NP_001139781; NP_038838
Location (UCSC)	Chr 7: 44.04 – 44.07 Mb	Chr 11: 5.74 – 5.75 Mb
PubMed search
- Wikidata
View/Edit Human	View/Edit Mouse

Drebrin-like protein is a protein that in humans is encoded by the DBNL gene.

== Interactions ==
Drebrin-like has been shown to interact with Cyclin-dependent kinase 4, MAP4K1 and ZAP-70.
