= Tanette =

Indonesian monarchy founded in the mid-16th century

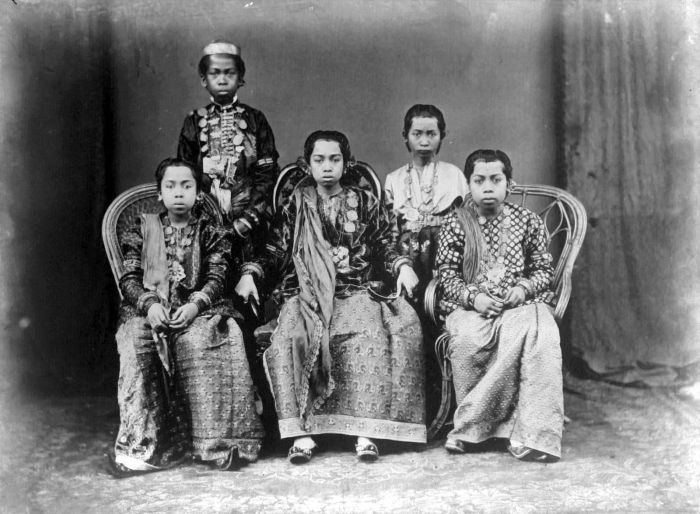
Princesses of Tanette

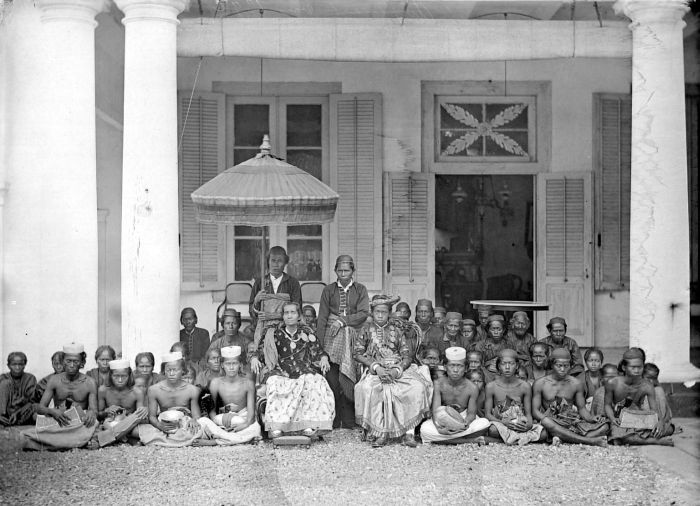
Portrait of the queen of Tanette, South Sulawesi

Tanette was an Indonesian monarchy founded in 1552 and abolished in 1960. It was located in Barru Regency, South Sulawesi.

== Rulers ==
- Datu GollaE (1552–1564)

....

- Tomaburu Limanna (1597–1603)
- Petta Pallase-lase’E (1603–1625)
- Petta Matinroe Ri Bulianna (1625–1666)
- Daeng Matulung (1666–1667)
- La Mappajanci Daeng Mattayang (1667–1690)
- Wé Pattékké Tana Daeng Tanisanga (1690–1733) (female)
- La Oddangriyung Daeng Matinring Sultan Yusuf Fahruddin (1733–1744)
- We Tenri Leleang (1744–1750) (female)
- Maddusila Tomampangewa (1750–1806)
- Lapatau (1806–1824) (1st reign)
- Daeng Tanisangnga (1824–1829) (female)
- Lapatau (1829–1840) (2nd reign)
- La Rumpang Megga (1840–1855)
- We Tenri Olle (1855–1910) (female)
- We Pancaitana BungawaliE Arung Pancana (1910–1926) (female)
- We Pattekketana Arung Lalolang (1926–1927) (female)
- Andi Baso Latenrisessu Datu Bakke (1927–1950)
- Andi Iskandar Unru (1950–1960)
