= Bible Society of Singapore, Malaysia and Brunei =

Nondenominational Christian organisation

- Lembaga Alkitab Singapura, Malaysia dan Brunei
- Abbreviation: BSSMB
- Predecessor: Bible Society of Malaya
- Successor: Bible Society of Malaysia; Bible Society of Singapore
- Formation: 1971 (1816)
- Dissolved: 1992
- Type: Bible society
- Purpose: Bible distribution, translation, advocacy, literacy, engagement, production
- Headquarters: Singapore
- Region served: Brunei, Malaysia and Singapore
- Affiliations: United Bible Societies

The Bible Society of Singapore, Malaysia and Brunei (Malay: Lembaga Alkitab Singapura, Malaysia dan Brunei; or BSSMB) was a nondenominational Christian organisation committed to translating and distributing the Bible in Singapore, Malaysia, and Brunei. It was the successor organisation to the Bible Society of Malaya, a branch of the National Bible Society of Scotland (NBSS). The Bible Society of Malaya prior to 1948 was a branch of the British and Foreign Bible Society (BFBS).

The BSSMB existed in this form until the Malaysian auxiliary established itself as the Bible Society of Malaysia in 1986 and the BSSMB was renamed the Bible Society of Singapore and Brunei. In 1992, the BSSMB was reorganised and renamed as the Bible Society of Singapore.

== History ==
=== Background ===
The BFBS' first engagement with the region was in Java when requests for Bibles were received from British soldiers stationed there during the British interregnum in the Dutch East Indies. The Java Auxiliary Bible Society was established in the house of the Lieutenant-Governor of Java, Sir Stamford Raffles on 4 June 1814.

In 1816, branches established in Penang and Malacca. Raffles proved to be a very ardent supporter of the work of the Bible Society and on his subsequent appointment as the Lieutenant-Governor of Bencoolen in 1818 initiated the establishment of the Sumatra Auxiliary Bible Society in the same year.

As a result of the reoccupation of Java by the Dutch in 1819 and the subsequent Anglo-Dutch Treaty of 1824, British settlements in Sumatra were transferred to the Dutch. This also resulted in the oversight of the auxiliary Bible Societies established in Java and Sumatra being transferred from the BFBS to the Netherlands Bible Society (NBG) and renamed the Nederlands Oost-Indisch Bijbelgenootschap (transl. Netherlands East-Indies Bible Society).

=== Early work in Southeast Asia ===
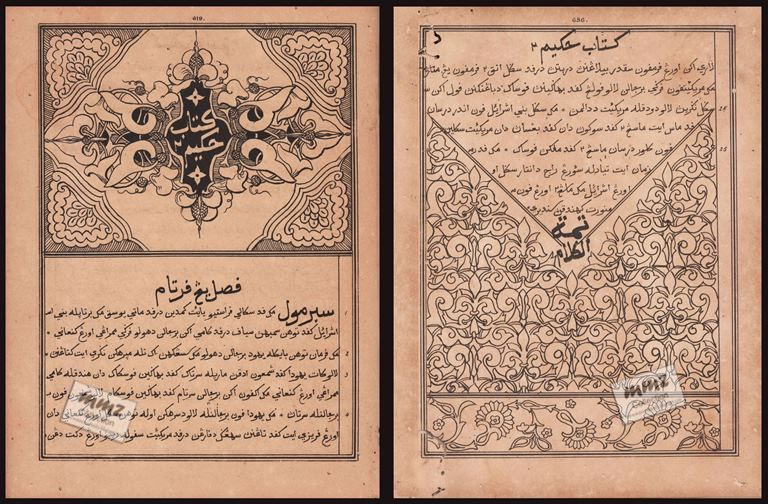
Leydekker's 1733 Malay translation of the Book of Judges in the Jawi script, revised and distributed by the Singapore, Malacca, and Penang Auxiliary Bible Societies

In 1814, the BFBS sponsored a revision of the 1733 Malay language version of the Gospels and the Acts of the Apostles originally translated by Melchior Leydekker. The revised translation of the whole New Testament was published in 1817 and primarily distributed in the Straits Settlement of Penang. The first entire printed translation of the Bible in the Chinese language was printed and distributed by the Society's branch in Malacca in 1814 where the London Missionary Society (LMS) had a mission station for missionaries waiting to go to China.

Translation of the Bible into the Batak language was begun in 1820 and a New Testament in the Javanese language was completed in 1831 under the auspices of the Society. Other translations commissioned and supported by the Society included the translation and printing of the Gospels in the Ngaju language in 1842 as well as the other languages of Malay Archipelago.

=== Early work in Singapore ===
In 1819, Raffles signed an agreement on behalf of the East India Company with the Sultanate of Johor to establish a trading post in Singapore. Singapore and Malacca served as a hub for missionaries who were awaiting permission to enter China. Singapore was considered particularly strategic due to its large Chinese population. In 1823, Robert Morrison of the London Missionary Society requested for 1,000 copies of the Chinese translation of the New Testament for Singapore. This request was supported by Raffles who also requested that the BFBS appoint an agent for Singapore after his return to England in 1826. A Bible depository was set up in the premises of the Institution Free School (subsequently renamed as the Singapore Institution in 1856 and then as the Raffles Institution in 1868) marking the beginning of Bible mission work in the region.

In 1824, a Singapore Committee was established in connection with the BFBS, and by 1830 had reformed itself as the Singapore Christian Union. This became the nucleus in which the Bible society in Singapore was established. On 4 July 1837, the Singapore Auxiliary Bible Society was established with Thomas Church as its first president and E. B. Squire as its first secretary. The Straits Ladies' Bible Association was also formed in the same year to support the work of the Bible Society. The stated object of the Auxiliary was:

to aid the Parent Institution in the dissemination of the Holy Scriptures, especially among the islands and shores of Eastern Asia, and to watch over and encourage the translation of the same into the various dialects that are spoken by the inhabitants. And in addition to this, it shall be their endeavour to invite the sympathies and engage the support of others in favour of the great design contemplated by the British and Foreign Bible Society, namely, that of giving to every individual of the human family, the word of God in a language that he can read and understand, and that Associations in connection with this Society be formed in China, Penang, Malacca, Batavia, and elsewhere.

=== Keasberry and Cooke ===
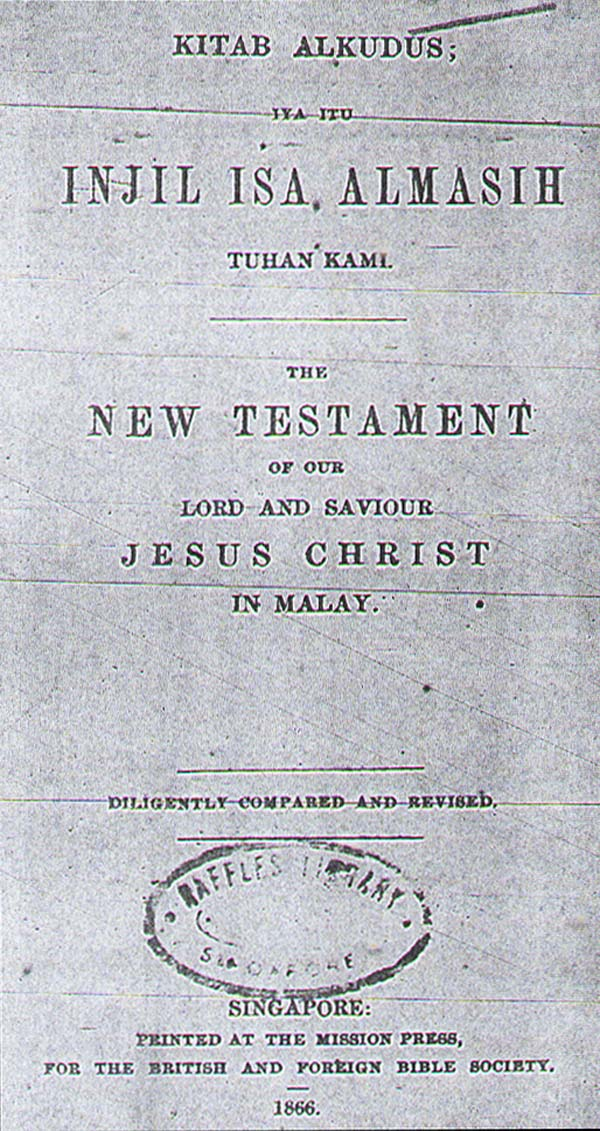
Keasberry's 1852 Malay translation of the New Testament distributed by the Singapore Auxiliary Bible Society and its branches in the Malay Peninsula

Benjamin Keasberry was one of the earliest Protestant missionaries to Singapore, arriving in 1837. Keasberry and his wife Charlotte Parker joined the LMS in 1839 and engaged in evangelistic work amongst the Malays in Singapore. He hired Munshi Abdullah to help him learn the language and started a new translation of the Bible in the Malay language as it was spoken in the Malay Peninsula, initially with the financial support of the LMS. In 1847, the LMS closed its stations in the Malay Peninsula and Keasberry resigned from the LMS to stay behind in Singapore to focus on mission work to the locals. His sought financial help for his translation work from the BFBS and in 1852, the revised New Testament was published.

By 1870, the work of the Auxiliary had almost been on a standstill for a few decades owing to the lack of workers and coordinated work. Most of the work of Bible printing was borne by Keasberry while the Singapore Ladies' Bible and Tract Society set up in 1857 by Sophia Cooke, an Anglican missionary of the Society for the Promotion of Female Education in the East, worked on distributing the Scriptures. Cooke would be better known for her contributions in consolidating and expanding the Chinese Girls' School (known today as St. Margaret's School) as well as the establishment of the Young Women's Christian Association in Singapore. In 1870, the first lay chaplain of St. George's Church, Singapore, Major Malan, together with Cooke revived the Auxiliary by separating the Bible department from the Tract department of Cooke's society.

=== From Auxiliary to Agency ===
After the death of Keasberry in 1875, Bible distribution work in Singapore and the Straits Settlements continued to be beset by challenges. Up to 1,200 copies of the Bible were distributed annually by volunteer distributors but little else was practicable. In 1880, famed general of the Madras Army and fervent evangelist, Sir Arthur Cotton publicly drew attention to the importance of Singapore as a regional base for the Bible Society. This was swiftly followed by an urgent request from Cooke for the need for organised effort in Bible work.

In 1882, John Haffenden, was appointed the full time agent of the Society in Singapore and the Auxiliary was wound down and replaced by a full-fledged agency of the BFBS. He stayed in this position until his retirement in 1905 and was replaced by the Rev. P. G. Graham. Graham was obliged to retired in 1907 on account of the ill health of his wife and was replaced as agent by Charles E. G. Tisdall, then the Society's agent in Persia, in 1908.

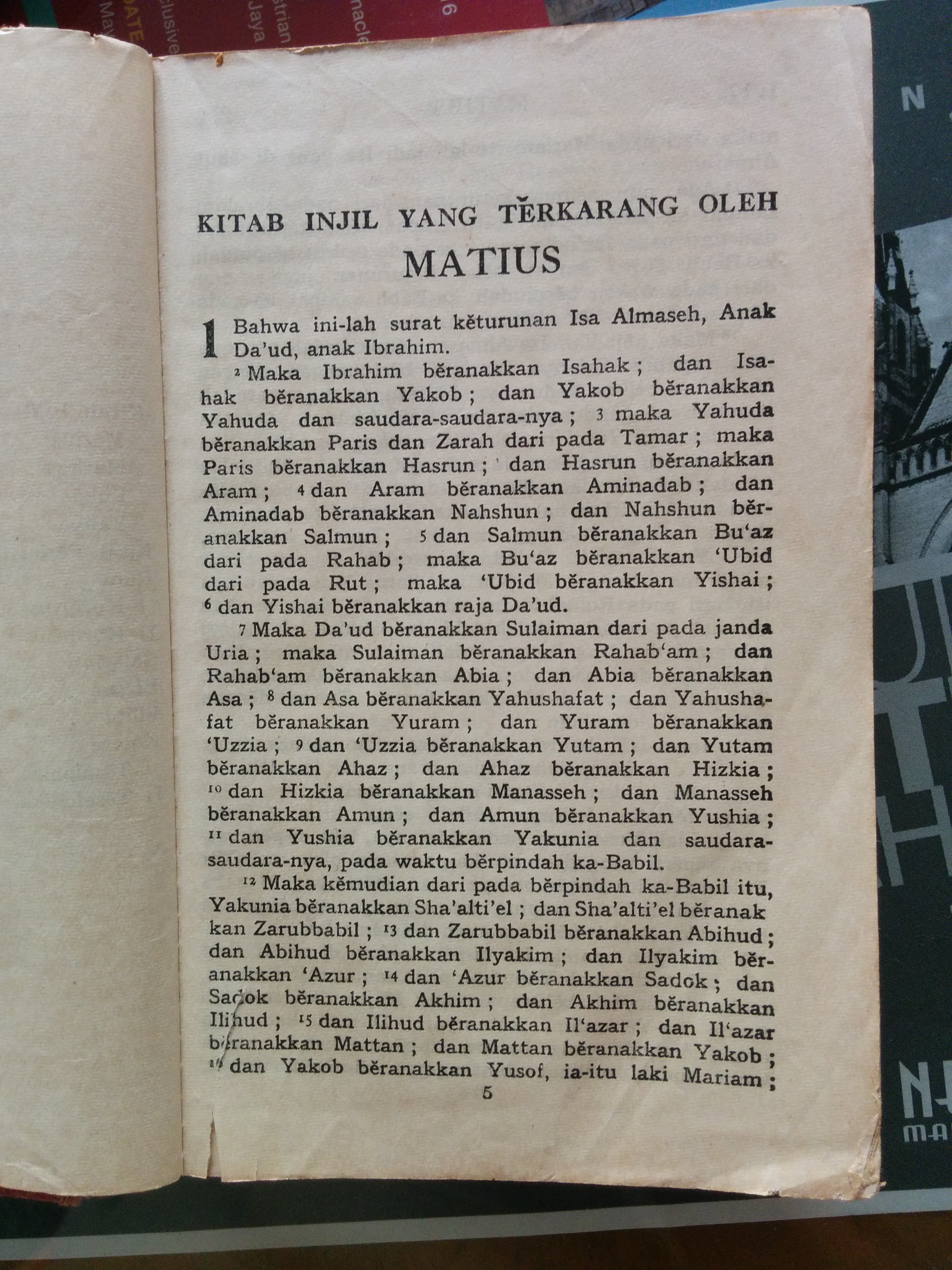
Gospel of Matthew. 1912 Shellabear Malay Translation of the New Testament (1949 Reprint) distributed by the Bible Society of Malaya

It was during this period that the agency which was now colloquially known as the Bible Society of Malaya oversaw, funded, published and distributed Shellabear's Malay translation of the Bible in the Jawi alphabet in 1912. A Baba Malay New Testament by Shellabear was also published and distributed by the agency in 1913.

Tisdall was replaced by his longtime assistant, Benjamin Purdy in 1921, after the former's resignation and later appointment as Secretary-Treasurer of the Auckland Grammar School in New Zealand in 1922. Purdy was also an active Scout and acted as the District Commissioner for the Scouting movement in Singapore until his retirement and return to England in 1928.

Purdy's was replaced as agent by Ernest Tipson in 1928. Tipson who hailed from Enfield, England, was a missionary serving in the Christian Brethren's Gospel Mission in Kuala Lumpur and moved to Singapore to take up the new position. In 1929, an agreement was reached between the BFBS, the NBSS, and the NBG to set up a joint translation committee to prepare a revised Malay translation of the Bible for the common use of Malay speaking Christians in the Malay Archipelago. Unfortunately the work was not complete with only the New Testament being completed and published in 1938 before the Second World War intervened.

=== Japanese occupation and the post-war years ===
With the Japanese occupation of Malaya, Tipson was interred first in Changi Prison and then later in the Sime Road Internment Camp as an enemy alien. While interred, he worked closely with Leonard Wilson, the Anglican bishop of Singapore to set up a programme of education for prisoners of war that came to be known as Changi University. The religious instruction programme provided by the Changi University later became the nucleus for the formation of Trinity Theological College after the end of the war.

After the Second World War, effort was made to consolidate and coordinate the work of the various Bible societies worldwide and this resulted in the formation of the United Bible Societies in 1948. As part of this consolidation, the work in Malaya was transferred from the BFBS to the NBSS. With Tipson's retirement in 1948, the NBSS appointed Ian Morrison to replace him.

Morrison pioneered the use of audio-visual aids to help in Biblical literacy and missionary work. To prepare for the eventual independence of Malaya and Singapore, Morrison worked towards transitioning the Society's administration and control to locals. In 1965, Morrison retired and the Rev Peter Hsieh, dean of Trinity Theological College, was appointed General Secretary.

=== Establishing independent national Bible Societies ===
In 1969, the Rev Khoo Siaw Hua, became the president of the Society and spearheaded the establishment of an independent Bible society to take over the work of the former agency. In 1970, the BSSMB was officially registered and Khoo was elected the first president of the new Society with Hsieh acting as General Secretary.

In the same year, the BSSMB initiated a new Malay language translation of the Bible using the dynamic equivalence method employed by the translators of the Good News Bible. The New Testament was completed and published in 1974 and the whole Bible published in 1987 as the Alkitab Berita Baik (Today's Malay Version).

The Malaysian auxiliary of the BSSMB started initiating effort to establish a national Bible Society in 1984 and in 1986 was officially registered with the Government of Malaysia as the Bible Society of Malaysia. The BSSMB then changed its name to the Bible Society of Singapore and Brunei. In 1992, the Society was again reorganised and registered with the Government of Singapore as the Bible Society of Singapore.

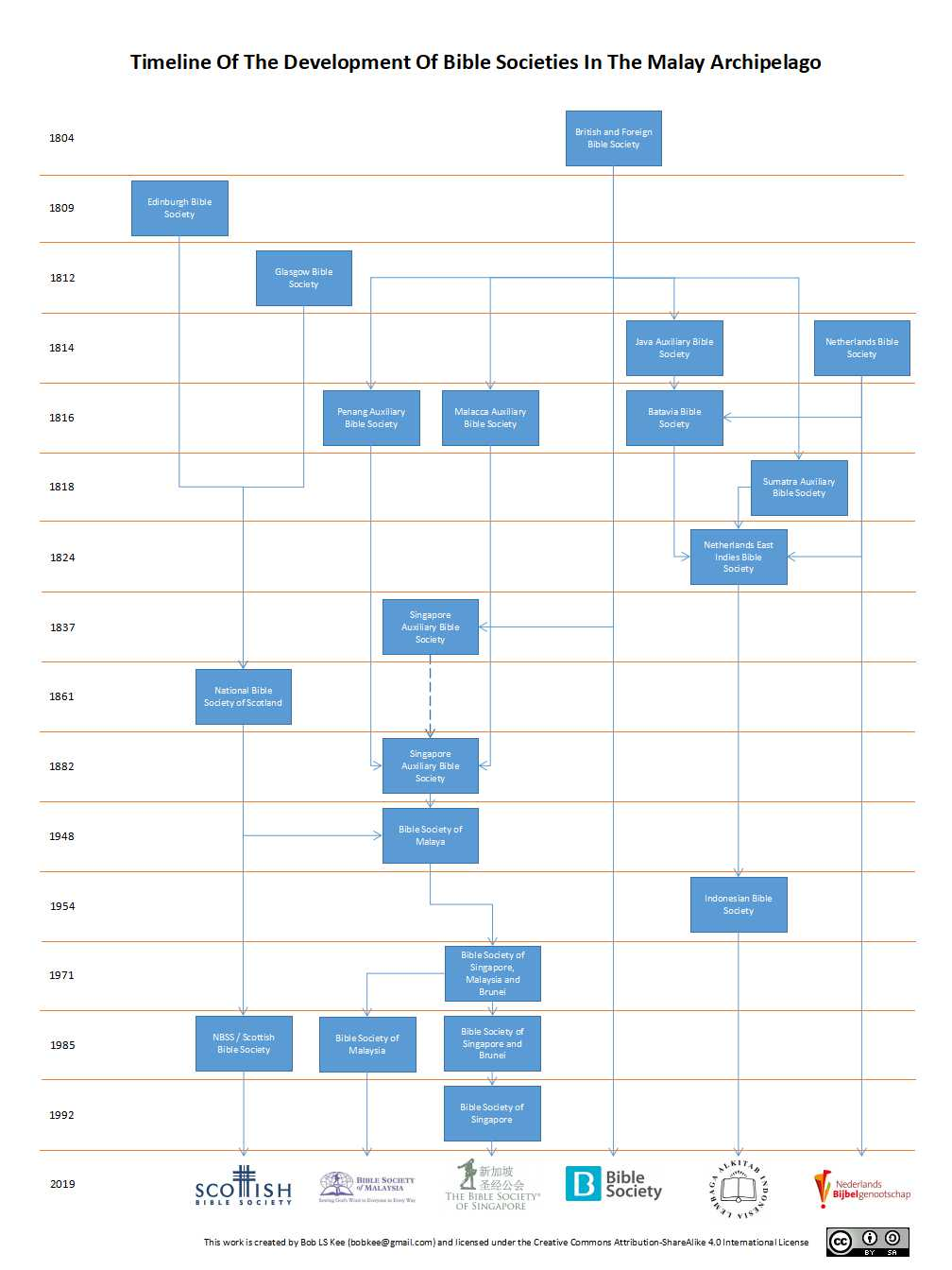
Timeline of the development of the various Bible Societies in the Malay Archipelago

== See also ==
- Bible translations into Malay
- Bible translations into Indonesian
- Bible translations into the languages of Indonesia and Malaysia
- Christianity in Singapore
- Christianity in Malaysia
- Christianity in Indonesia
- Malay Mission Chapel (1843)
