= Bible translations into Indonesian =

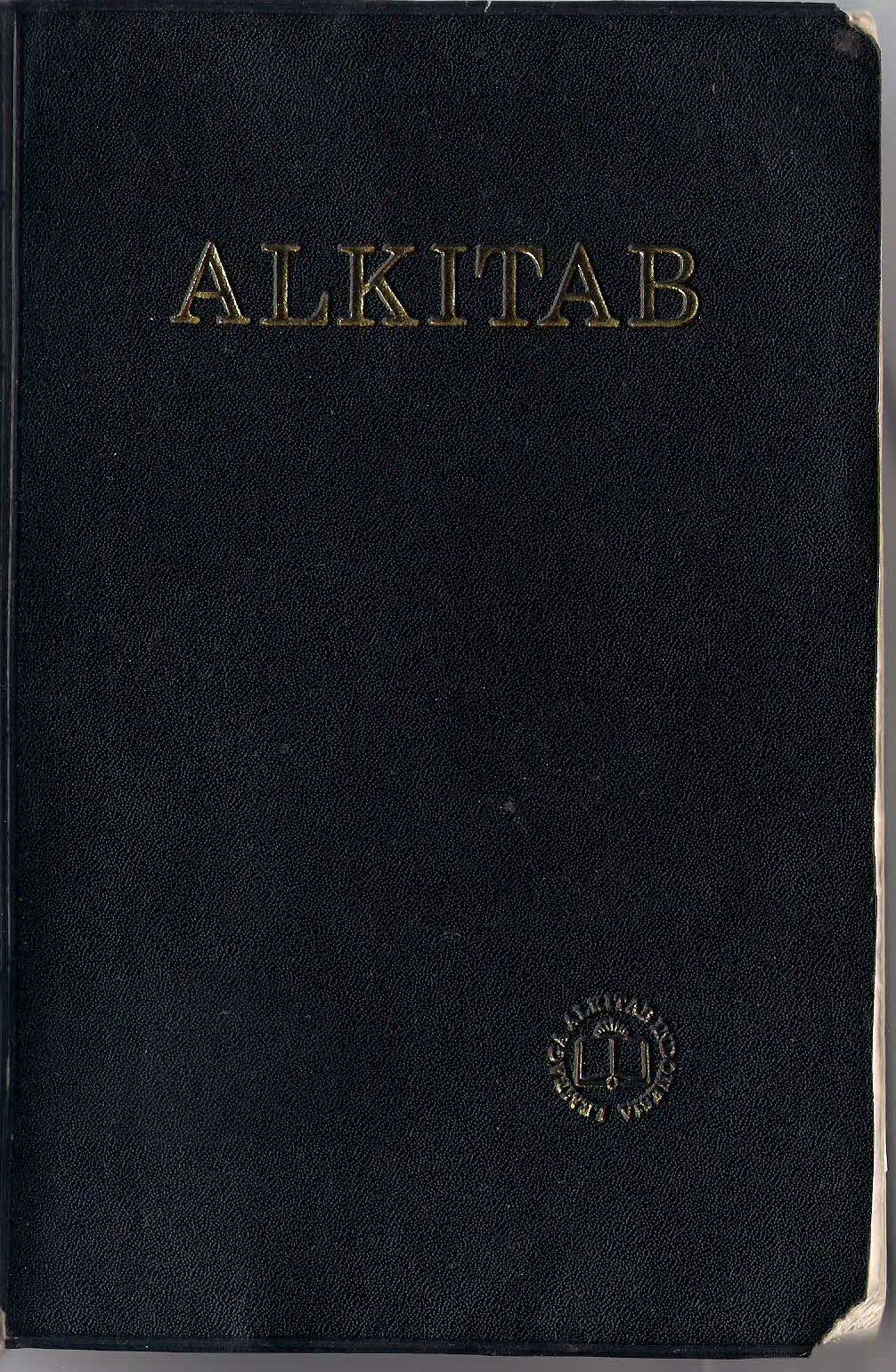
A copy of Terjemahan Baru bible

The first translation of the Bible (Alkitab) in the Indonesian language was Albert Cornelius Ruyl's translation of the book of Matthew (1629). Between then and now there have been at least 22 other translations, excluding translations to local languages of Indonesia (out of more than 700 local languages of Indonesia, more than 100 languages have portions or whole Bible translated, while some, like Javanese and Batak, have more than one version). The most widespread translation used by Indonesian right now is Terjemahan Baru (1985), or "New Translation" published by LAI ("Lembaga Alkitab Indonesia" or Indonesian Bible Society).

Gottlob Brückner (1783–1857) translated the Bible into Javanese, the largest local language of Indonesia, in 1820

Translation	Abbrev.	Year	John 3:16
Kitab Suci Terjemahan Dunia Baru, Edisi 2017 (New World Translation of the Holy Scriptures, 2017 edition)	NWT	2017	Allah begitu mengasihi dunia ini sehingga Dia memberikan Putra tunggal-Nya, supaya setiap orang yang beriman kepadanya tidak dibinasakan tapi mendapat kehidupan abadi.
Perjanjian Baru dalam Terjemahan Sederhana Indonesia, Edisi Ketiga (New Testament in Plain Indonesian, 3rd Edition) Yayasan Alkitab Bahasakita (Albata)	TSI	2021	Memang kasih Allah sangat luar biasa kepada orang-orang di dunia ini sehingga Dia menyerahkan Anak-Nya satu-satunya, supaya setiap orang yang percaya kepada Anak-Nya itu tidak akan binasa, tetapi menerima hidup yang kekal.
Terjemahan Baru (literally: New Translation) Terjemahan Baru Edisi Kedua (literally: New Translation Second Edition)	TB	1974 2023	Karena begitu besar kasih Allah akan dunia ini, sehingga Ia telah mengaruniakan Anak-Nya yang tunggal, supaya setiap orang yang percaya kepada-Nya tidak binasa, melainkan beroleh hidup yang kekal.
Bahasa Indonesia Masa Kini (Modern Indonesian)	BIS	1985	Karena Allah begitu mengasihi manusia di dunia ini, sehingga Ia memberikan Anak-Nya yang tunggal, supaya setiap orang yang percaya kepada-Nya tidak binasa, melainkan mendapat hidup sejati dan kekal.
Terjemahan Lama (Old Translation)	TL	1954	Karena demikianlah Allah mengasihi isi dunia ini, sehingga dikaruniakan-Nya Anak-Nya yang tunggal itu, supaya barangsiapa yang percaya akan Dia jangan binasa, melainkan beroleh hidup yang kekal.
World Bible Translation Center Draft version	WBTC	2006	Begitu besar kasih Allah kepada dunia ini sehingga Allah telah memberikan Anak-Nya yang tunggal, supaya setiap orang yang percaya kepada-Nya tidak binasa, melainkan menerima hidup yang kekal.
Kitab Suci Injil (Gospel Holy Book)	KSI	2000	Allah begitu mengasihi dunia ini, sehingga Ia menganugerahkan Sang Anak yang tunggal itu, supaya setiap orang yang percaya kepada Sang Anak tidak binasa, melainkan memperoleh hidup yang kekal.
Firman Allah Yang Hidup (Word of God Is Alive)	FAYH	1989	Karena Allah sangat mengasihi isi dunia ini, sehingga diberikan-Nya Anak-Nya yang tunggal, supaya setiap orang yang percaya kepada-Nya, tidak akan binasa, melainkan beroleh hidup yang kekal.
Ende		1969	Karena demikian besarlah tjinta Allah kepada dunia, sehingga Ia telah menjerahkan Putera-tunggalNja, agar semua orang jang pertjaja akan dia djangan binasa, melainkan mempunjai hidup abadi.
Shellabear Draft		1912	Karena demikianlah Allah mengasihi isi dunia ini, sehingga diberinya Anaknya yang tunggal itu, supaya barang siapa yang percaya akan dia jangan ia binasa, melainkan beroleh hidup yang kekal.
Melayu Baba		1883	Kerna bgitu-lah Allah sudah kaseh ini dunia, sampai dia kasi Anak-nya yang tunggal spaya masing-masing orang yang perchaya sama dia jangan binasa, ttapi dapat hidop yang kkal.
Klinkert 1870		1870	Karena demikianlah kasih Allah akan doenia ini, sahingga dikaroeniakannja Anaknja jang toenggal, soepaja barang-siapa jang pertjaja akandia itoe djangan binasa, melainkan mendapat hidoep jang kekal.
Klinkert 1863		1863	Karna bagitoe Allah tjinta sama doenia, sampe Dia kaish Anaknja jang toenggal, sopaja masing-masing orang, jang pertjaja sama Dia, djangan binasa, melainken mendapet hidoep jang kekel.
Leydekker Draft		1733	Karana sasangat 'Allah sudah meng`asehij 'isij dunja, sahingga 'ija sudah karunjakan 'Anakhnja laki 2 jang tonggal, sopaja sasa`awrang jang pertjaja 'akan dija 'itu djangan binasa, hanja ber`awleh kahidopan kakal.

== See also ==
- Christianity in Indonesia
- Bible translations into Malay
