= Bible translations into the languages of Indonesia and Malaysia =

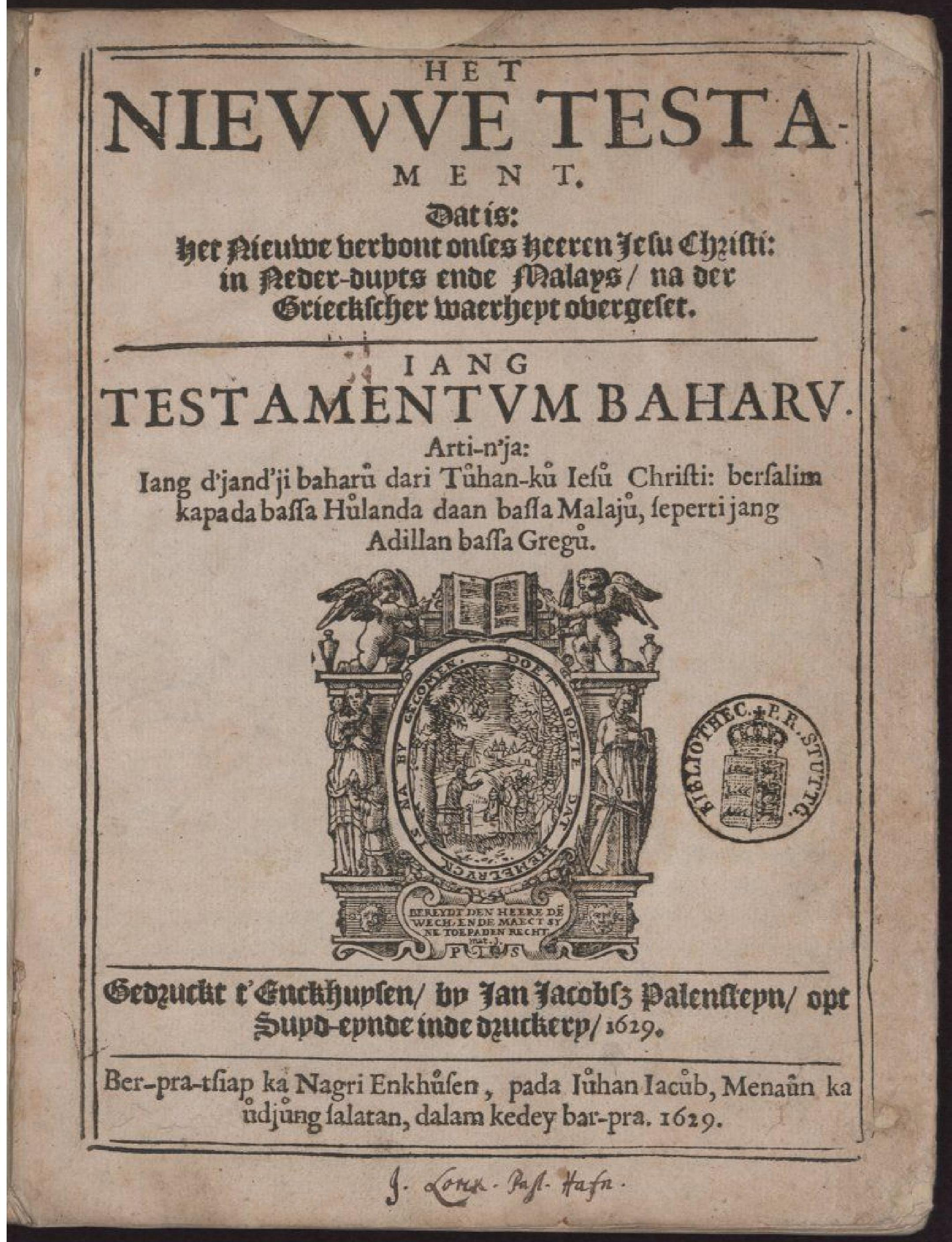
Ruyl 1629

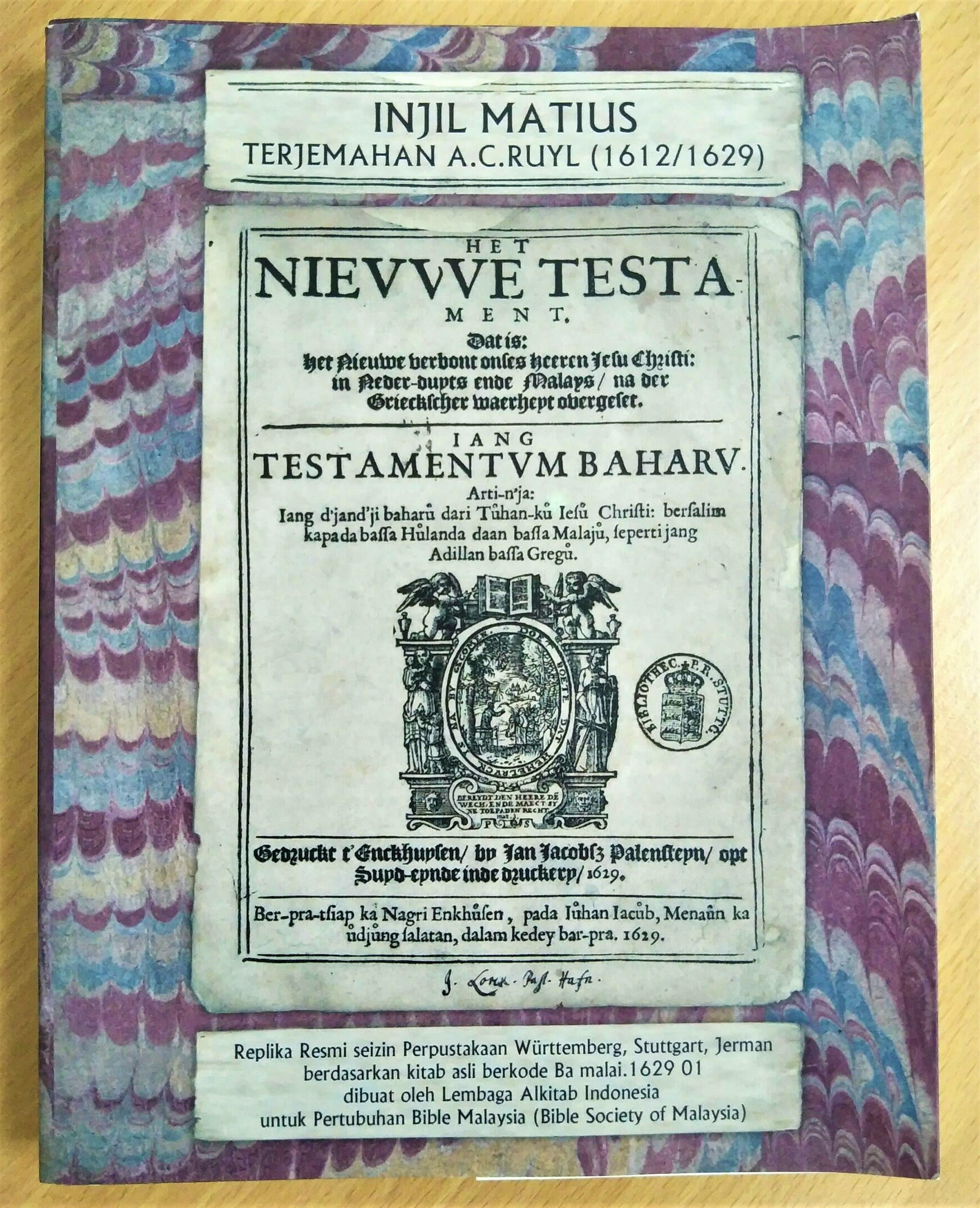
Ruyl 1629 Cover Facsimile Reproduction

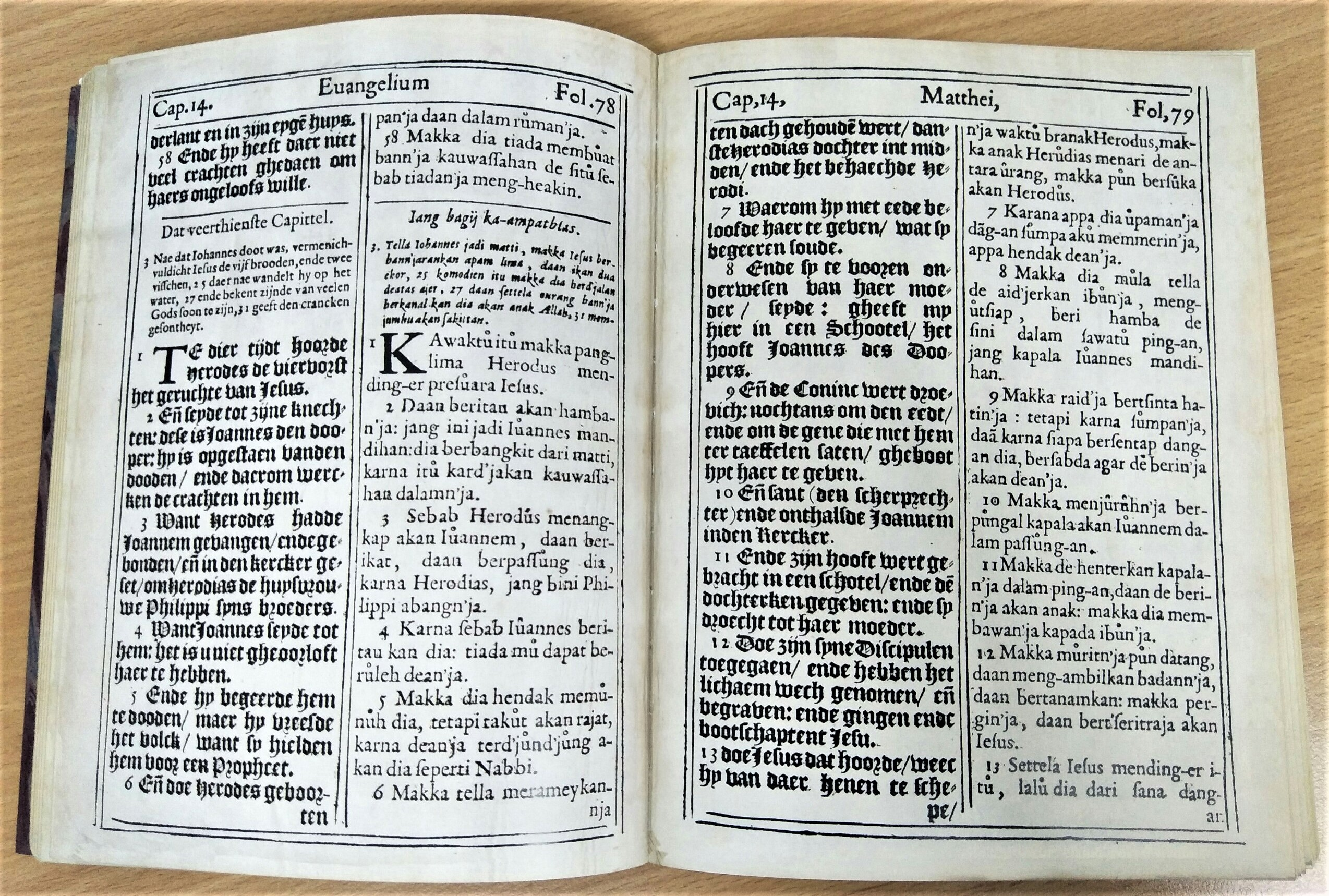
Inside 1629 Matthew Translation

Bible translations into the languages of Indonesia and Malaysia have a lot of common history up until the modern era. Apart from the shared Malay language which historically was the lingua franca of the Malay Archipelago and forms the basis for the national languages of Indonesia and Malaysia today, portions of the Bible have been translated into a variety of indigenous languages in the region.

The translation of the Bible into the Malay language was one of the first extant translations of the Bible in an East Asian language.

Albert Cornelius Ruyl, a Protestant, first translated the Gospel of Matthew in 1612 into the Malay. This was followed by the translation of the Gospel of Mark in 1638. The full canonical gospels and the Acts of the Apostles was revised and published in 1651 by Justus Heurnius, the chaplain of Batavia. The main early Translators of the Bible into the Malay language were Melchior Leydekker, H. C. Klinkert, and W.G. Shellabear. Leydekker was appointed to the ministry of the Dutch churches at Batavia in 1678.

The 3 volume Leydekker translation in the Jawi script was published by J. Willmet in 1824.

Today, there are more than 112 indigenous languages in use in Malaysia, while indigenous Indonesian languages consist of more than 701 languages.

== Languages of Indonesia ==
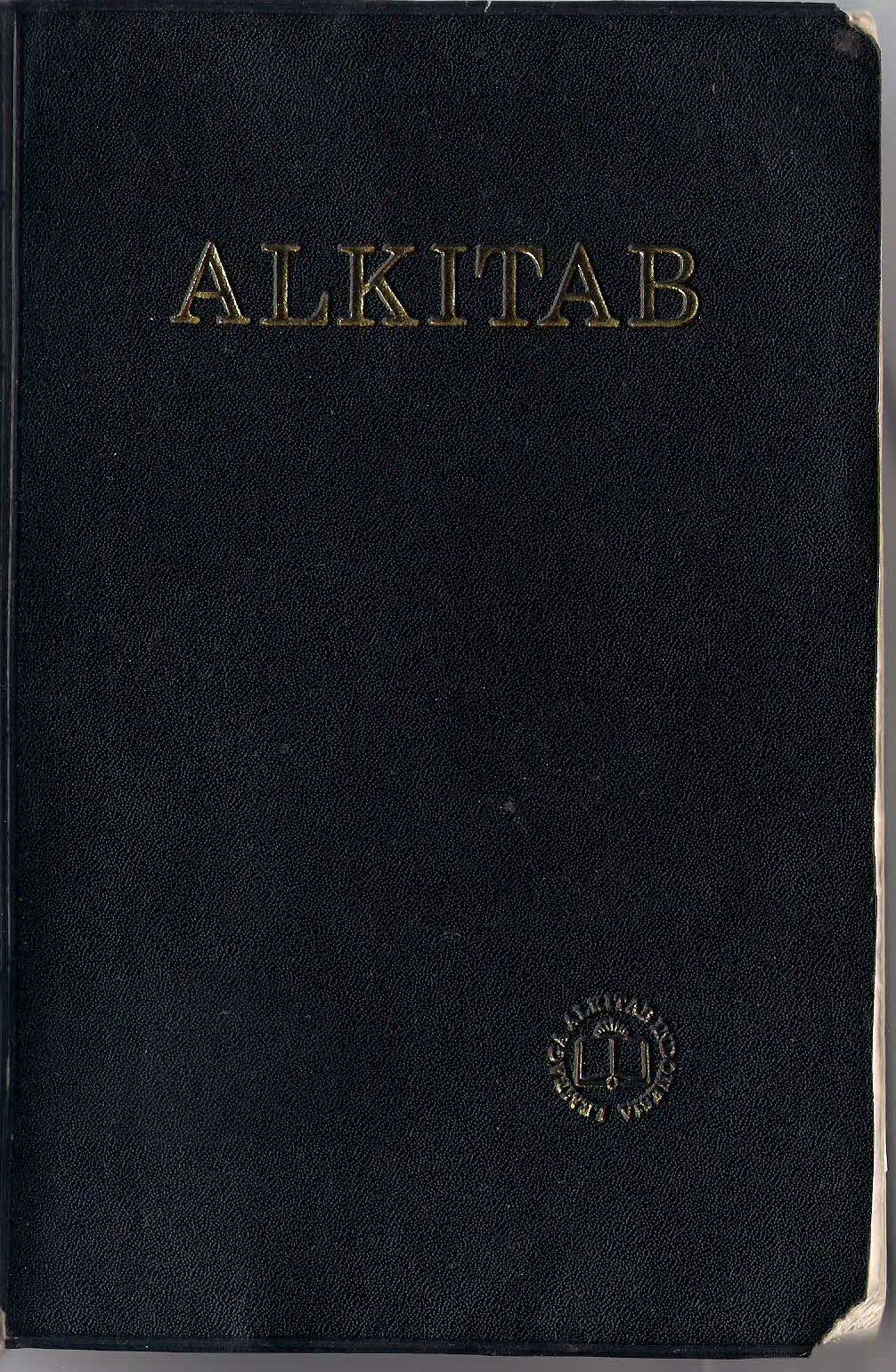
A copy of Terjemahan Baru bible

In addition to Indonesian, Bible translations (complete or partial) also available in more than 70 languages of Indonesia, some could be accessed online. In 2020, Jehovah's Witnesses published 4 complete bible translation into Batak Toba, Batak Karo, Javanese, and Nias language, also 1 NT translation into Sundanese.

=== Indonesian ===
Ruyl 1638

Since Indonesia gained its independence, there have been at least ten Bible translations made, due to the rapid changes in the Indonesian language; every few years each translation's language becomes outdated. The most widespread translation used by Indonesian speakers right now is the Terjemahan Baru, or "New Translation" (1974), published by LAI ("Lembaga Alkitab Indonesia," or Indonesian Bible Society).

List of modern (1945 onward) translations:

- Alkitab Terjemahan Lama (1958): called the Old Translation after the New Translation (1974) came out. Before that it was the only translation in the Indonesian language. However, it was not an original translation; rather, it was a combined translation from Klinkert's Old Testament (1879), in Malay language, and Bode's New Testament (1938) also in Malay language, which was called "an emergency publication"
- Alkitab Bouma/Ende (1968): first Catholic translation in Indonesian language by P.Y. Bouma, printed in Ende, Flores, Nusa Tenggara Timur
- Alkitab Terjemahan Baru (1974): first fresh Protestant translation in Indonesian language by Indonesian Bible Society's team of translators, printed in Jakarta
- Alkitab Kabar Baik (BIS) (1985): first dynamic translation in Indonesian language (since Terjemahan Baru was translated in formal Indonesian) by IBS, based on Today's English Version
- Firman Allah Yang Hidup (1989) by Yayasan Kalam Hidup: printed in Bandung, this translation is based on The Living Bible, and paraphrased by a team led by Dr. Ganda Wargasetia
- Kitab Suci Terjemahan Dunia Baru (Edisi 1999) - Based on English edition of the New World Translation of the Holy Scriptures released in 1984, produced by Jehovah's Witnesses.
- Kitab Suci Injil (2000): a revision of 1912 Malay New Testament by Shellabear, printed side-by-side with its Greek text
- Kitab Suci Komunitas Kristiani (2002) by Yayasan OBOR: a new Catholic translation, printed in Jakarta
- Alkitab Versi Mudah Dibaca (2005) by World Bible Translation Center: a new translation based on the Easy to Read Version
- Indonesian Literal Translation (2008) by Yayasan Lentera Bangsa: a new translation aimed primarily at the wording of "Yahweh" instead of "Allah" (used in every other Indonesian Bible)
- Wasiat Baru - King James Indonesia (2011): a new translation based on the King James Version and other English versions such as the New International Version
- Kitab Suci Terjemahan Dunia Baru (Edisi 2017) - This Bible is based from the English 2013 revision of the New World Translation of the Holy Scriptures, replacing the previous Indonesian edition released in 1999, produced by Jehovah's Witnesses.

=== Languages of Java ===
==== Javanese ====
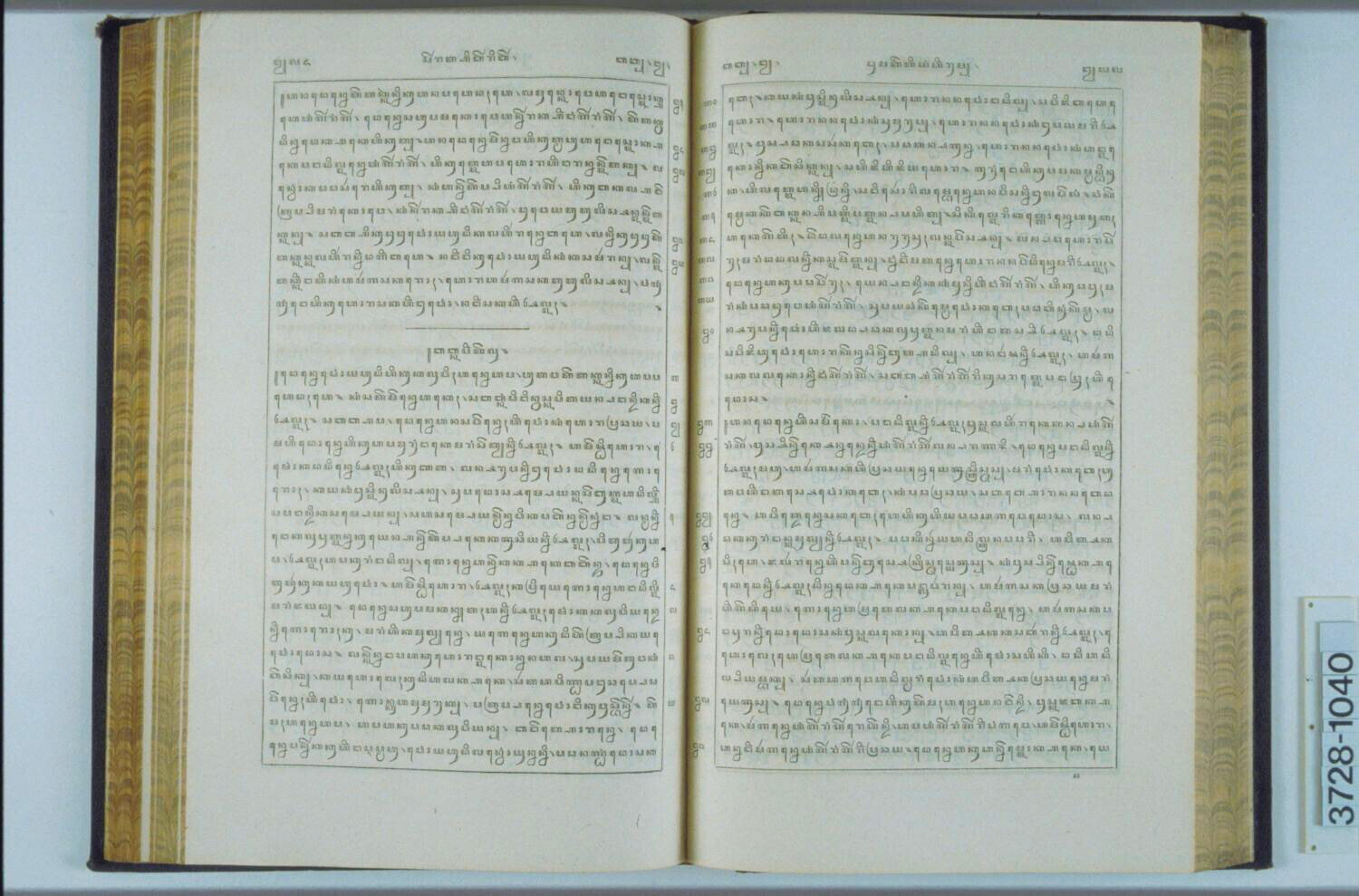
Alkitab in Javanese script

Gottlob Brückner (1783–1857) translated the Bible into Javanese language, the largest local language of Indonesia, in 1820.

- Brückner Bible: printed 1829 in Serampore
- Gericke Bible: 1848
- Janz Bible: 1893
- Indonesian Bible Society: 1994 (OT and NT in Today Java's Version) and 2006 (NT in Javanese Formal Translation)
- Kitab-Kitab Yunani Kristen Terjemahan Donya Anyar (New World Translation of the Christian Greek Scriptures): 2018, produced by Jehovah's Witnesses.

==== Sundanese ====
J. Esser translated the Matthew into Sundanese language of western Java (1854). Then G.J. Grashuis translated Luke in 1886. In 1877, the whole New Testament was finished by Sierk Coolsma, and followed by the whole Bible in 1891. Coolsma also published some books of the NT in Arabic script (Jawi script) in 1871.

Translation	John 3:16
Javanese, Formal (2006 rev.)	Awitdéné Allah anggoné ngasihi marang jagat iku nganti masrahaké Kang Putra Ontang-anting, supaya saben wong kang pracaya marang Panjenengané aja nganti nemu karusakan, nanging nduwènana urip langgeng.
Javanese (1994)	Awit saka gedhéning sih-katresnané Gusti Allah marang jagad, nganti Panjenengané ngurbanaké Putrané ontang-anting, supaya saben wong sing precaya marang Sang Putra mau ora nemu karusakan, nanging ngalamana urip langgeng.
Sundanese, Formal (1997)	Sabab dunya teh, pohara nya diasihna ku Allah; nepi ka Putra Tunggal-Na oge dipasrahkeun, supaya sing saha anu percaya ka Anjeunna ulah nepi ka binasa; tapi sabalikna, bisa tinemu jeung hirup abadi.
Sundanese (1991)	Karana kacida mikaasihna Allah ka alam dunya, nepi ka masihkeun Putra tunggal-Na, supaya sakur anu percaya ka Anjeunna ulah binasa, tapi meunang hirup langgeng.

=== Madurese ===
The Madura-language Bible, known as Alketab, is a translation of the Bible into the Madurese language. It was first published by the Indonesian Bible Society (Lembaga Alkitab Indonesia, LAI) on Sunday, August 28, 1994.

Initially, the Madurese Bible was available only in the form of the gospels and the Acts of the Apostles, translated by J. P. Esser, a Dutch missionary. This translation was published in the Javanese script by the Netherlands Bible Society in 1890. The National Bible Society of Scotland reportedly contributed £30 to support Esser's translation work. Fourteen years later, a new translation of the Gospel of Luke and the Epistle to the Philippians, written in the Latin alphabet, was added.

The next major Bible translation project into Madurese took place from 1982 to 1992. The translator was Cicilia Jeanne d'Arc Hasaniah Waluyo, who was not a theologian but an ordinary church member and the daughter of the late Madurese cultural figure Abdurachman Sastrosubroto. At the time, Hasaniah worked as a teacher of music, English, and Catholic religion at a junior high school in Pamekasan. She was commissioned by the Indonesian Bible Society in Jakarta in 1981 to undertake the translation. She possessed an excellent command of refined Madurese (bahasa Madura halus). Among the Madurese people, the Sumenep dialect is regarded as the highest and most prestigious variety and serves as the standard form taught in educational settings.

After undergoing a two-year field testing period, the Madurese Bible was published by the Indonesian Bible Society under the title Alketab, with the subtitle E Dhalem Basa Madura ("In Everyday Madurese"). The Old Testament (Parjanjian Kona) consists of 1,306 pages, while the New Testament (Parjanjian Anyar) contains 512 pages. The translation was accepted and officially recognized by the Indonesian Bishops' Conference for use within the Catholic Church. Alketab was formally launched by the Secretary General of the Indonesian Bible Society, Drs. Soepardan, on August 28, 1994. The first public reading from the new translation was given by Reverend Emeritus Alpeyus Kaeden, the first Madurese person to become a minister in the East Java Christian Church.

Translation	John 3:16
Madurese (1994)	Sabab Allah reya talebat raja taresnana ka manossa e dunnya reya, sampe' marengngagi Pottrana se nonggal, sopaja pa'-sapa'a se parcaya ka Salerana ta' sampe'a mate, tape olle odhi' se saongguna tor langgeng.

=== Languages of Kalimantan ===
Dayak Ngaju translation was the first bible translation into languages of Kalimantan (NT 1846, OT 1858). It was done by J. F. Becker and A. F. A. Herdeland and reviewed by Timotheus Marat and Nikodemus Tomonggong. The new Dayak Ngaju translation was published by the LAI in 1999. LAI also published translations in other Kalimantan languages, such as Ot Danum language (NT 1997) and Ma'anyan language (NT 1996).

Translation	John 3:16
Dayak Ngaju (1999)	Karana kalote Hatalla sinta dengan olon hong kalunen toh, sampai Ie manenga anak Ayue je tunggal, uka gagenep oloh je percaya intu Ie dia binasa, tapi mandino pambelom je bujur tuntang katatahie.

=== Languages of Maluku ===
==== Ambonese Malay ====
Wycliffe Bible Translators in partnership with The Protestant Church of Maluku translated the Ambonese Malay New Testament and portions of the Old Testament. It was dedicated on September 4, 2022.

Translation	John 3:16
Ambonese Malay (2022)	Tagal Allah paleng sayang manusia di dunya ni sampe Antua utus Antua pung Ana satu areng-areng ni datang ka dunya par tabus manusia pung dosa-dosa. Antua utus Antua pung Ana ni biar sapa sa yang parcaya Antua pung Ana ni, dia seng mati tarus, mar hidop tarus-tarus deng Antua.
North Moluccan Malay	Memang Tuhan Allah paling sayang skali pa samua orang di dunia ini, sampe Dia kase Dia pe Anak yang cuma satu untuk tebus manusia pe dosa-dosa, supaya sapa saja yang percaya pa Dia pe Anak tara mo dapa hukuman tapisa deng Tuhan Allah, tapi mo dapa hidup deng Dia slama-lamanya.

=== Languages of Sulawesi ===
==== Buginese ====
B.F. Matthes (1818–1908) translated the Bible into Bugis language of southern Sulawesi (1863 Matthew, 1888 NT, 1901 OT) and Makassar language (1864 Matthew, 1888 OT, 1900 NT).

==== Manado Malay ====
The New Testament Bible in Manado Malay was officially launched in August 2017 by the Indonesian Bible Society. This translation project took 15 years to complete, involving linguists, international consultants, and local religious leaders to maintain theological accuracy while preserving the local dialect.

==== Pamona ====
In North Sulawesi, in the Alifuru dialect of the Pamona language is spoken by the people of Amurang, the Gospel of Matthew was published by the Netherlands Missionary Society in 1852, although no other biblical books were subsequently published. In the Tontembo'an dialect, another Alifuru dialect, a Bible History was translated by Nicolaus Adriani of the Netherlands Bible Society (NBG) and published in 1907. Adriani also produced translations of the Gospel of Luke and the Acts of the Apostles in the Bare'e dialect, which is spoken in Central Sulawesi. These were published by the NBG in 1913 and 1926, respectively. The New Testament in the Bare'e dialect was completed in 1933 by Nicolaus Adriani and Albert C. Kruyt, with assistance from Mrs. Adriani and S. J. Esser. In 1897, Adriani completed a "trial translation" of the Scriptures in the Bare'e language, but, most of his time and energy were devoted to studying the Poso language and other regional languages.

==== Sangir ====
E.T. Steller (1834–1897) translated the Bible into Siau language (1883 NT) and Sangir language of northern Sulawesi (1942 NT).

Translation	John 3:16
Buginese (1997)	Nasaba makkumani Allataala namaseinna rupa tauwé ri linoéwé, angkanna Nabbéréyangngi Ana’ Tungke’na, kuwammengngi na tungke’ tau iya matepperiyéngngi dé’ nabinasa sangadinna lolongengngi atuwong tongengngé sibawa mannennungengngé.
Makassar (1999)	Nasaba’ lanri Nakamaseang duduna Allata’ala rupataua ri lino, sa’genna Napassareammo Ana’ sitau-tauNa, sollanna inai-nai tappa’ ri Ia tena nalapanra’, passangalinna lanagappai katallassang sitojennaya siagang mannannunganga.
Manado Malay (2017)	Soalnya Tuhan Allah sayang skali ni dunia sampe Dia srahkan tu Dia pe Anak satu-satunya, supaya tiap orang yang percaya pa Dia nyanda mo binasa mar mo dapa hidop kekal.
Pamona	Maka ewaseʼi kabangke ntowe ndaya mPue Ala ri tolino ri lino seʼi, painaka Sira mawai Ana-A anu sambaʼa-mbaʼa, da naka waʼa ntau anu maaya Sira bareʼe da magero, paikanya da marata katuwu anu monco pai bareʼe da reʼe kapusanya.
Sangir (2003)	Ual᷊ingu Mawu Ruata kerenẹeng kakěndage su ral᷊ohon dunia e, hakịu i Sie něnarakangu Ahus'E mang sěmbaụ tadeạu apan taumata kụ mangimang si Sie tawe mawinasa, kaiso kawe makahombang pẹ̌bawiahẹ̌ kakalẹ̌.

=== Languages of Sumatra ===
==== Batak Toba ====
Ludwig Ingwer Nommensen (1834 - 1918), of the Rhenish Mission Society, translated the Bible into Batak Toba of northern Sumatra (1878 in Batak script and 1885 in Latin script)

Jehovah's Witnesses also translate their Bible in Batak Toba. It is called Bibel Hata ni Debata tu Angka Jolma na Naeng Mangolu di Tano na Imbaru (Mateus-Pangungkapon), which based from the Christian Greek Scriptures of the English revision of the New World Translation of the Holy Scriptures released in 2013.

==== Mentawai ====
The Gospel of Mark was the first biblical book translated into Mentawai by Reverend A. Lett of the Rhenish Missionary Society. It was published in 1911 by the Netherlands Bible Society.

===== Nias =====
The first attempt to translate the Bible into Nias language was undertaken by Reverend E. Denniger of the Rhenish Missionary Society, who prepared a translation of the Gospel of Luke in 1874. This translation was published by the British and Foreign Bible Society. The Netherlands Bible Society subsequently assumed responsibility for the translation work.

Another missionary from the Rhenish Missionary Society, Reverend H. Sundermann, completed the New Testament in 1892 with the assistance of Ama Mandranga and several other Nias collaborators (Luke, 1874; New Testament, 1891). This was followed by the publication of the Psalter in 1903. The translation of the entire Bible was completed and printed in 1913.

Translation	John 3:16
Batak Toba (1998)	Ai songon on do holong ni roha ni Debata di portibi on, pola do Anakna na sasada i dilehon, asa unang mago ganup na porsea di Ibana, asa hangoluan na salelenglelengna di ibana.
Mentawai	Kopet katet bagania ka taikapolak Taikamanua, pat akenangan Togania sisasara, bule senen simatonem baga ka tubunia ta ilalango, tapoi mubakkat le ka purimanuaiat sitaitatata.
Nias	Si manõ sa wa’omasi Lowalangi nõsi guli danõ, no ibe’e Nononia andrõ, si ha sambua, ena’õ lõ tekikõ dozi samati khõnia, ena’õ so khõra wa’auri si lõ aetu.

== Languages of Malaysia ==
=== Malay (1612) ===
After Malaya became independent in 1957, a radical transformation occurred in the use of Malay in Christian literature. The original thrust had been two-fold, to work amongst the Peranakan Chinese and the Malays. The former had no longer become dependent on Baba Malay literature as the younger generation started becoming more conversant in English while legal and social considerations had essentially halted evangelistic work amongst the Malays, especially in Malaya (and to a lesser extent in Singapore).

The emphasis shifted from providing literature in the Malay language to one that would provide literature in the Malaysian language, a standardised form of Malay in Malaysia, for future generations who would be educated in the language. The Malay Language Committee of the British and Foreign Bible Society auxiliary in Singapore, the Bible Society of Malaya was phased out in the 1960s and was replaced by the National Language Committee. The Bible Society of Malaya was re-constituted as the independent Bible Society of Singapore, Malaysia and Brunei (BSSMB) in 1969 and continued the work of the originating Bible society.

The first translation in Bahasa Malaysia was published in 1987 by the Bible Society of Singapore, Malaysia and Brunei as the Alkitab Berita Baik (transl. Good News Bible). This was followed by a revision in 1996 by the Bible Society of Malaysia.

A formal equivalence translation of the Bible was published in 2015 and is known as the Alkitab Versi Borneo (transl. Borneo Version Bible). This is the first formal translation of the Bible in Bahasa Malaysia since Malaya became independent.

Translation	John 3:16
Alkitab Berita Baik (1996)	Allah sangat mengasihi orang di dunia ini sehingga Dia memberikan Anak-Nya yang tunggal, supaya setiap orang yang percaya kepada Anak itu tidak binasa tetapi beroleh hidup sejati dan kekal
Alkitab Versi Borneo (2015)	Allah begitu mengasihi dunia sehingga menganugerahkan Anak-Nya yang tunggal supaya setiap orang yang percaya kepada-Nya tidak binasa melainkan mendapat hidup kekal

=== Iban (1864) ===
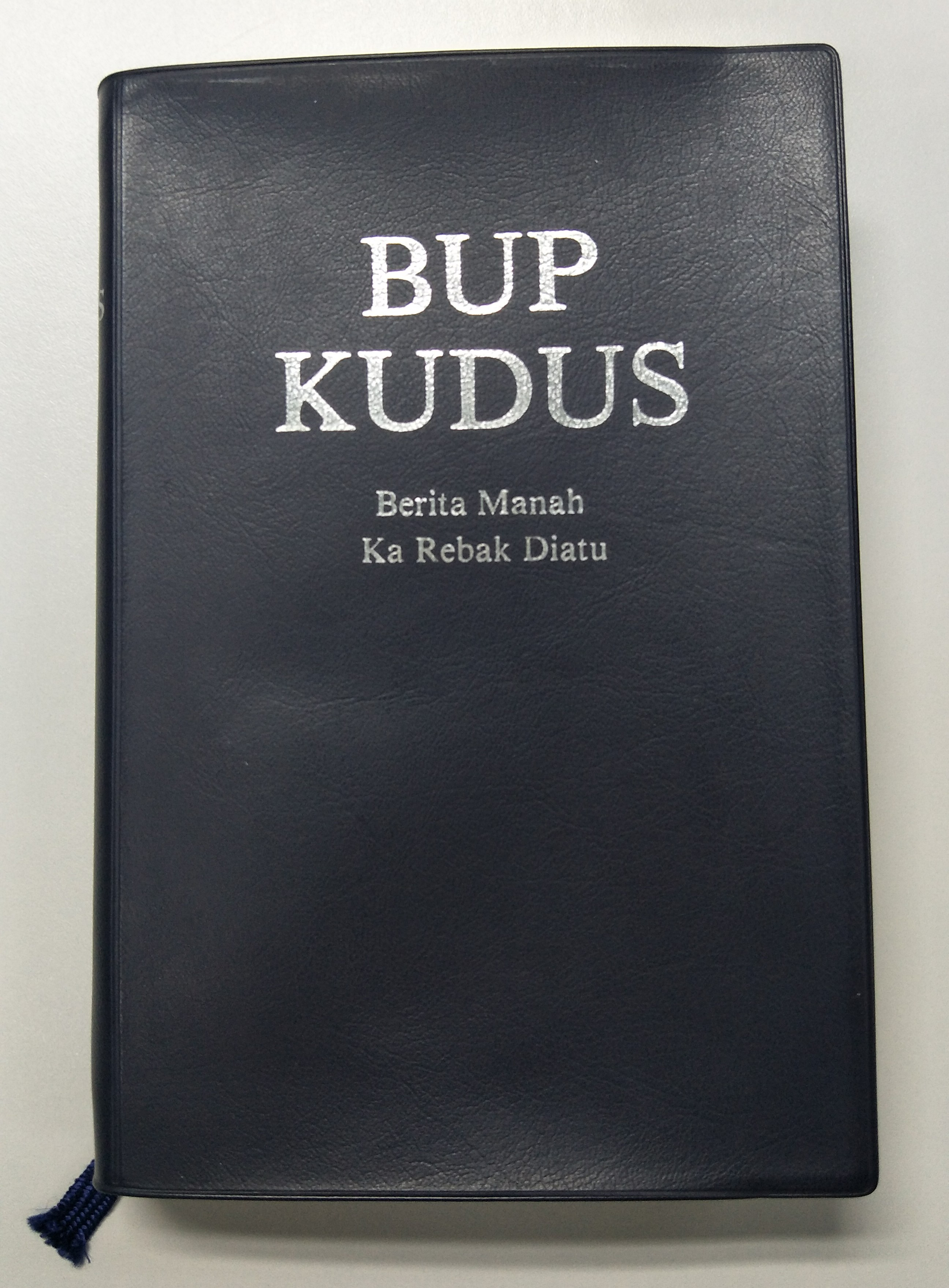
Iban Bible

Portions of the Bible in the Iban language (Ethnologue: iba) spoken by the Iban people (also known as the Sea Dayak) of Sarawak was first translated in the 19th century. In 1864, the gospels of Matthew and Mark was published by the Society for the Promotion of Christian Knowledge. In 1933, the full New Testament was published by the British and Foreign Bible Society.

A new translation of the whole Bible in Iban known as the Bup Kudus was initiated in 1988 by a committee of Iban Christians and published by the Bible Society of Malaysia. After the publication of the Iban full bible in 1988, a number of churches had requested the Bible Society of Malaysia to revise the full Bible to achieve better clarity and naturalness of the Bible. At the same time, the Roman Catholic churches in Sarawak also appealed for a translation of the Deuterocanonical books in Iban. Starting on May 1999, the Bible Society of Malaysia began its revision process. Prior to commissioning the revision and the translation of the Deuterocanonical books, the Bible Society of Malaysia brought together representatives from mainline Sarawakian churches (Roman Catholic, Anglican, Methodist) to decide on the orthography of the revision. The ecumenical committee agreed to update the orthography of the Bible according to the new spelling system taught in schools. The written vowel "o" should then be updated to "u", for instance, "jako" should be spelt as "jaku". The vowel "o" in "orang" and other foreign loanwords is retained (domba, chunto, dosa). The verbal suffix "ka" was then combined to the preceding verb, e.g., "awak ka" would be spelled as "awakka". Besides linguistic updates, the committee reworked the existing Iban Bible by checking with the original languages of the Bible, namely Hebrew, Aramaic, and Greek. English loanwords were also used when appropriate, e.g., "misteri" and "panik". Trial versions consisting Genesis, Ezra, Mark, Romans, Galatians, Baruch, and 1 Maccabees were sent to numerous Sarawakian church denominations for community review. The ecumenical revision work by the Iban churches was published in 2011 in two versions by the Bible Society of Malaysia: the Protestant canon (Bup Kudus Baru) and Roman Catholic canon (Bup Kudus Baru + Deuterokanonikal).

Immediately after the publication of the revised Iban Bible Bup Kudus Baru, the Sarawakian church requested for more Bible study materials in the Iban language. A Study Bible project was commissioned by the Bible Society of Malaysia in 2018, with the goal to translate the notes and paratextual materials from the ESV Global Study Bible into Iban, to be placed alongside the revised Iban translation Bup Kudus Baru. A trial version was launched in 2024, in conjunction with the launch of the Malay formal equivalent translation Alkitab Kudus Malaysia and the Malaysian Malay Study Bible (Alkitab Berita Baik Edisi Studi). Eventually in 2026, the Iban Study Bible (Bup Kudus Edisi Studi) was launched in Kuching and in Sibu, with the presence and support of the Association of Churches Sarawak, Anglican Diocese of Kuching, and Methodist Sarawak Iban Annual Conference.

Translation	John 3:16
Injil kudus nunda ka S. Joan (1912)	Kra Allah Taala rindu ka orang isi dunya datai ka Yia mri anak tunggal Yia, awak ka samoa orang ti arap ka Yia nda mata merinsa, amai bulih idup ti meruan.
Penyanggup Baru (1952)	Allah Taala rindu ka mensia, datai ka iya mri Anak tunggal iya, ngambi ka samoa orang ti arap ka iya enda lalu mati, utang bulih idup meruan.
Bup Kudus (1988)	Laban Allah Taala udah balat rindu ka dunya nya kebuah iya meri Anak tunggal iya, awak ka genap iko orang ti arap ka iya enda mati, tang tau bulih pengidup ti meruan.
Bup Kudus Baru (2011)	Laban Allah Taala balat rinduka dunya, nya alai Iya meri Anak Tunggal Iya, ngambika genap iku orang ke arapka Iya enda mati tang bulih pengidup ti meruan belama iya.

=== Bau Bidayuh (2020) ===
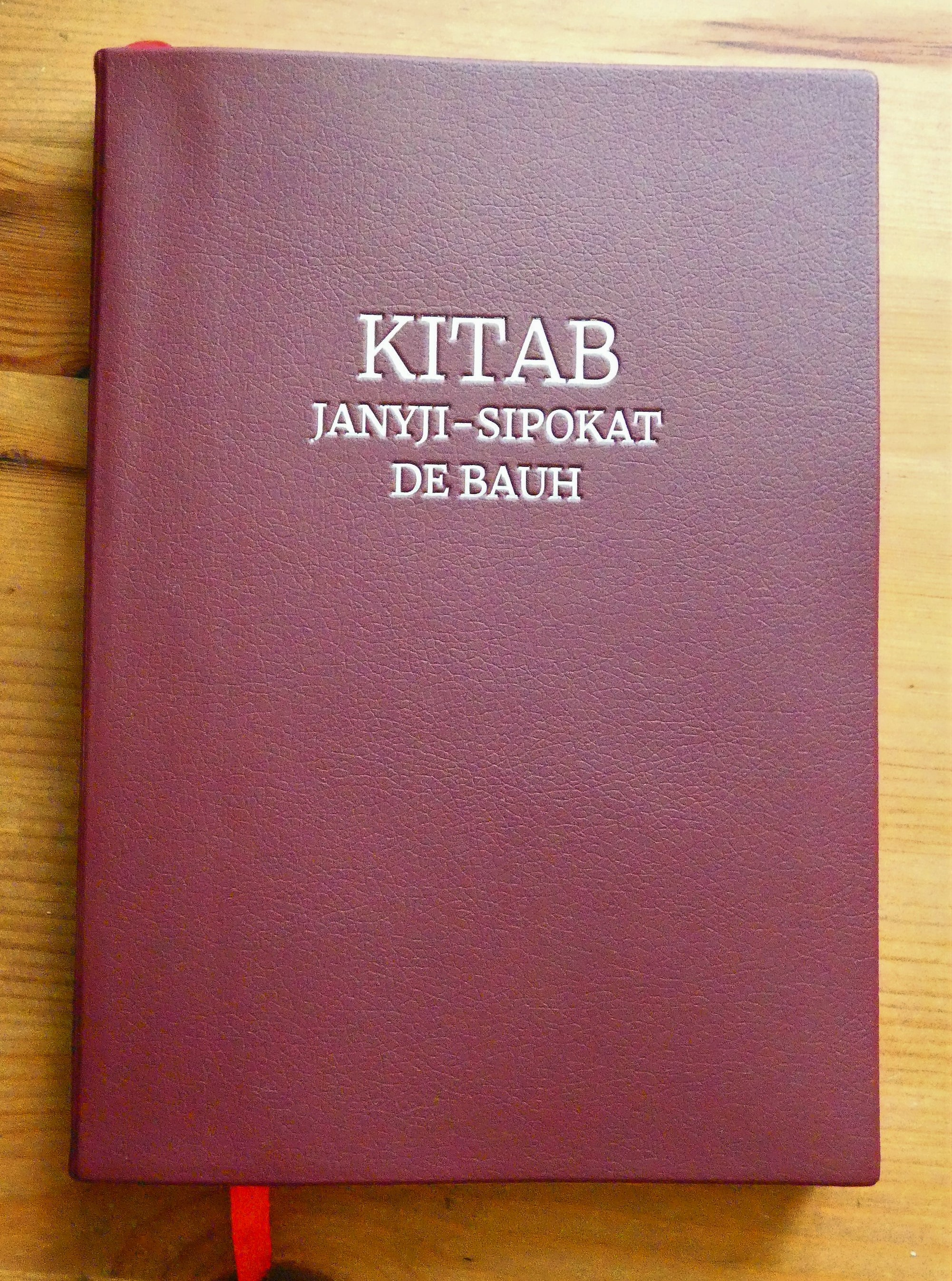
Bau Bidayuh New Testament

The New Testament in the Bau Bidayuh language (Ethnologue: sne) spoken by the Bidayuh people (also known as the Land Dayak) of Sarawak was published by the Bible Society of Malaysia in 2020. The New Testament is known as Kitab Janyji-Sipokat De Bauh. The print and audio format of the New Testament was dedicated and launched on 23 February 2020 in Bau, Sarawak.

Translation	John 3:16
Bau Bidayuh (2020)	Sobap Topa' tok-tok rindu' dunya sape Eh serah Onak Tombo' Eh, sa' suo' nya'a de bisaya' daang Yoh idoh di'-eh rie' tibuang, pak eh rie' dapod idip de adu-adu.

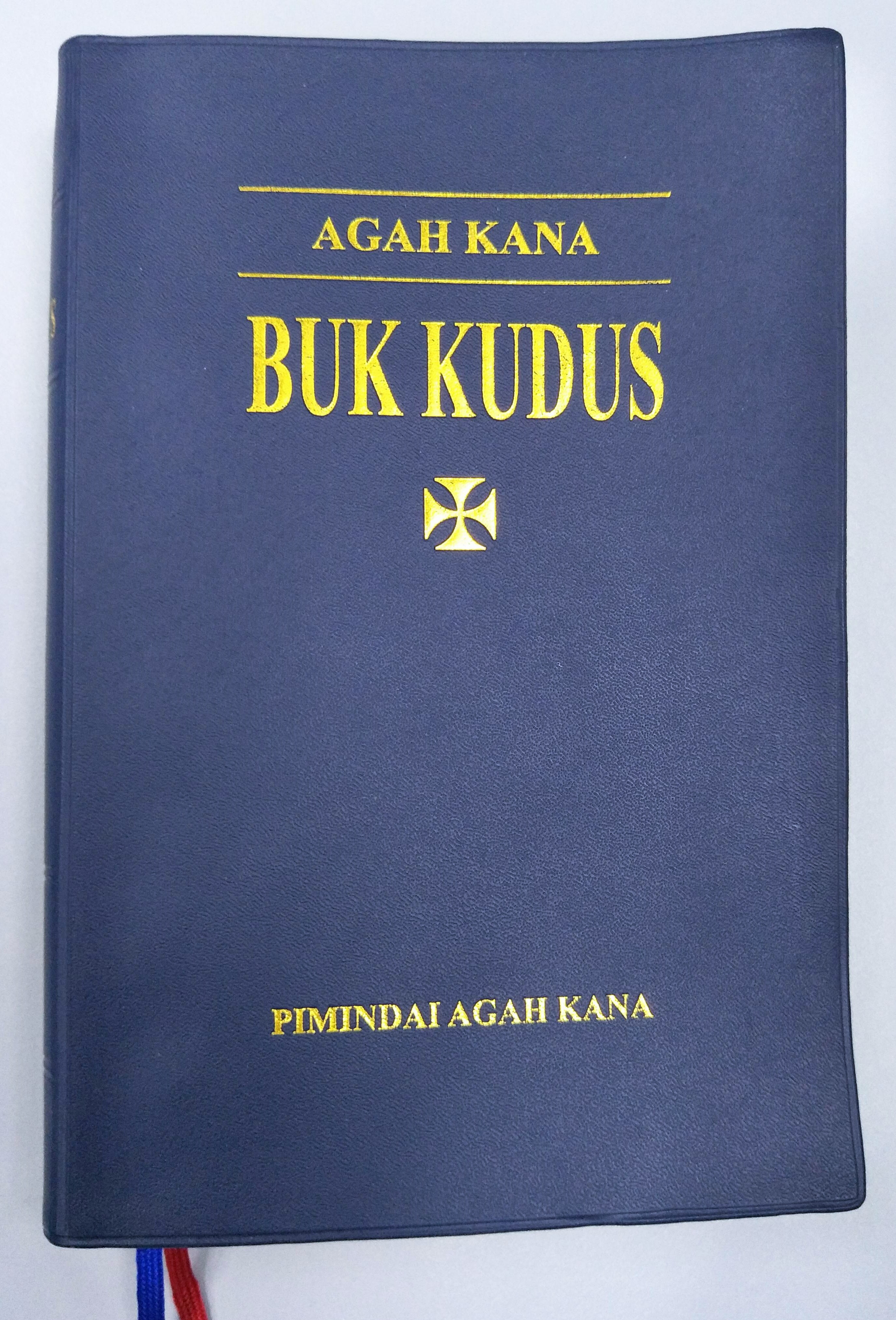
Biatah Bidayuh Bible

=== Biatah Bidayuh (1887) ===
Portions of the Bible in the Biatah language (Ethnologue: bth) spoken by the Bidayuh people (also known as the Land Dayak of Sarawak was first translated and published in 1887 by the Society for the Propagation of the Gospel. A complete New Testament was published by the Bible Society of Malaysia in 1963.

A complete revision of the New Testament called the Simanya Bauh was published by the Bible Society of Malaysia in 2003. A complete Bible was published in 2014 by the Bible Society of Malaysia and is known as Buk Kudus.

Translation	John 3:16
Simanya Bauh (2003)	Tapa ruai rindu ong ndŭg ka mbŭh nggen Anak tambŭ-I, isa barang naan adi sabah di Ayŭh dŭh re kabŭs pak dapŭd udip adi sawŭ adi tan adu adu

=== Baba Malay (1913) ===
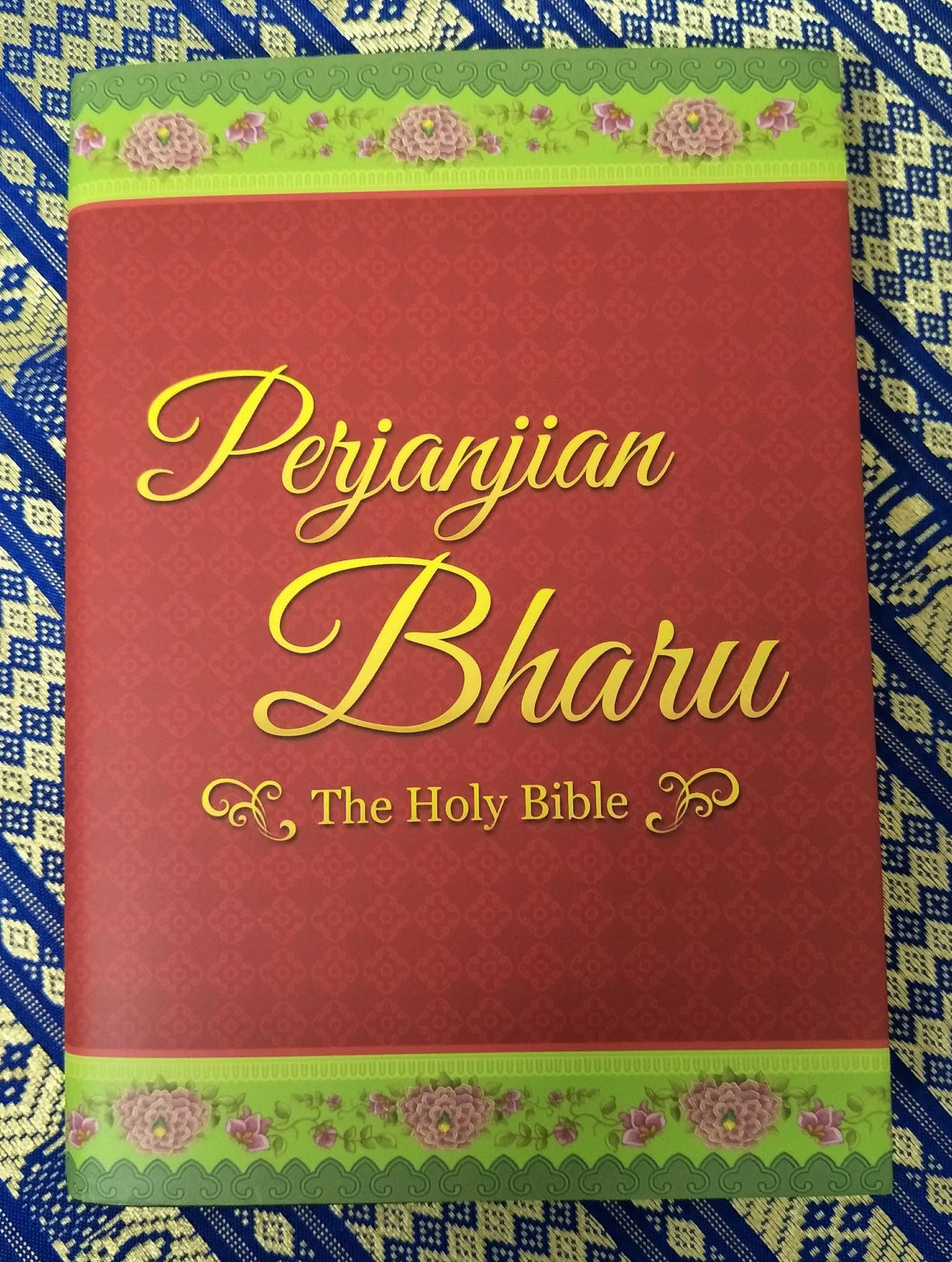
Baba Malay New Testament (2007)

A New Testament in Baba Malay (Ethnologue: mbf) used by the Straits Chinese was translated and published in 1913 by W. G. Shellabear. The Bible Society of Singapore did a reprint of the Baba Malay New Testament in 2007 as there were no longer any copies of the original printing available for native speakers of the language to use.

Translation	John 3:16
Perjanjian Baharu Melayu Baba (1913)	Kerna bgitu-lah Allah sudah kaseh ini dunia, sampai dia kasi Anak-nya yang tunggal spaya masing-masing orang yang perchaya sama dia jangan binasa, ttapi dapat hidop yang kkal

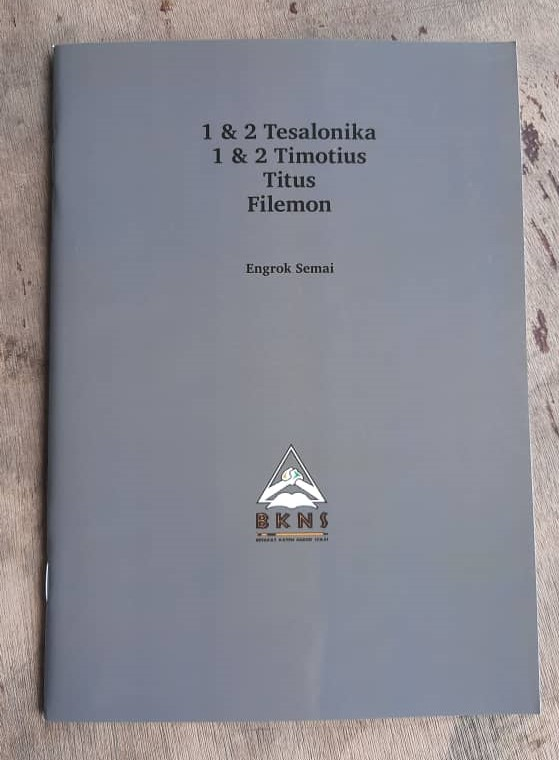
Volume 3: Portions of the New Testament in Semai language (2019)

=== Semai (1935) ===
Earlier referred to as the Sengoi language, portions of the Bible was translated as early as 1935 and published in 1951. The book of Luke was revised and published as a diglot with the Semai language (Ethnologue: sea) and Bahasa Malaysia text shown side-by-side in 2012 by the Bible Society of Malaysia. Work remains ongoing for the translation of the whole Bible into the Semai language. Three volumes were released in 2019: Volume 1: Genesis, Ruth, and Jonah; Volume 2: The four Gospels and Acts; Volume 3: 1 & 2 Thessalonians, 1 & 2 Timothy, Titus, Philemon.

Translation	John 3:16
Semai Translation (2019)	Jenang ihat Kihok ha manusia lei Kiog IKenon de nek nanek, dea jap mai de pecaya nu IKenon ajeh doh pek naidat tapi naikep sinui de lei ditehjeh.

=== Jah Hut (2023) ===
A translation of the Bible into the Jah Hut language (Ethnologue: jah) spoken by the Jah Hut people of West Malaysia was launched in January 2024. It is known as Bukuq Haba Agan Jahut and was published by the Bible Society of Malaysia.

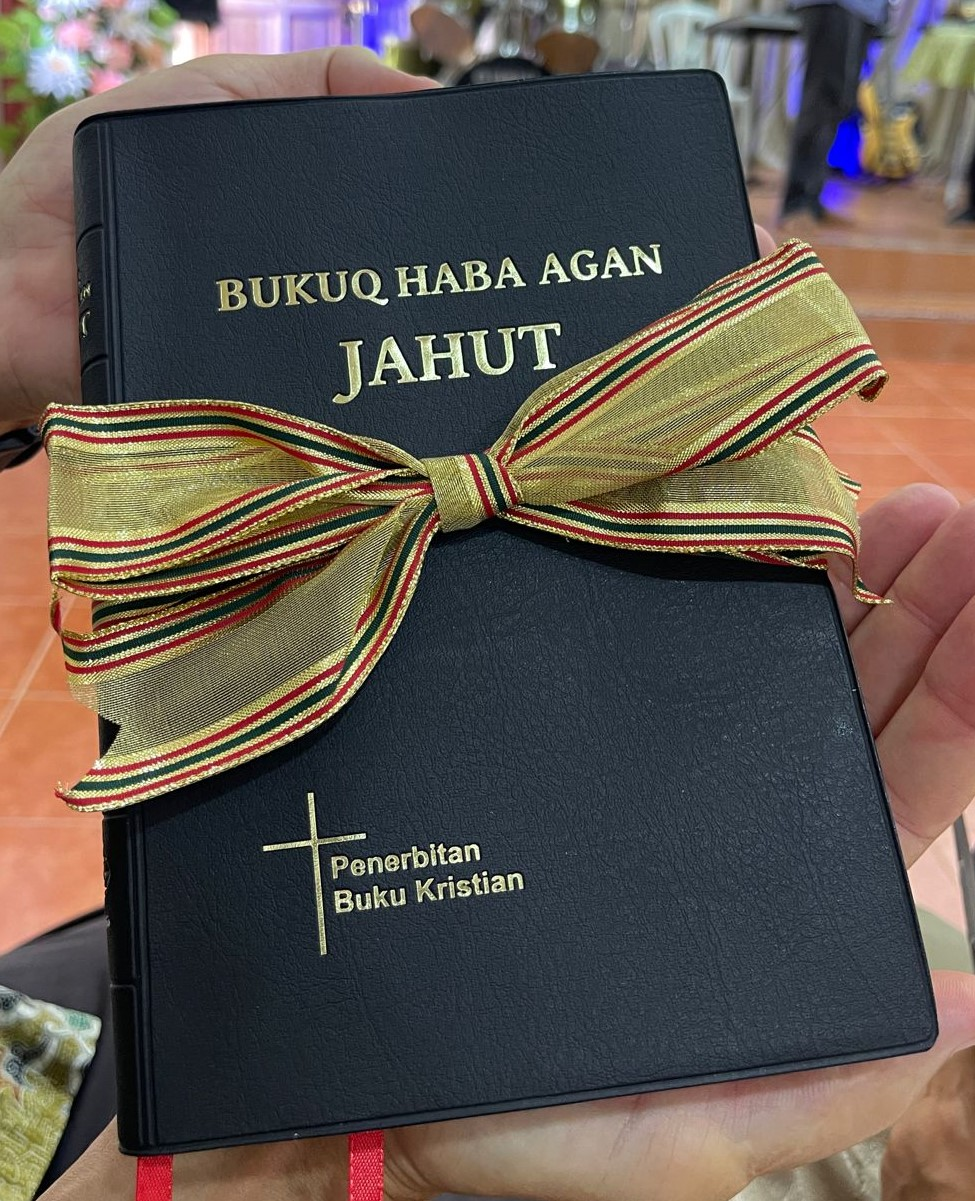
The Bible in the Jah Hut Language

Translation	John 3:16
Jah Hut Translation (2023)	Alaq sayèng lalu jah kay duniyaq doh sampèy Iyeh ok Iwãq Eh hak tunggal, supayaq ne'dec jah hak pechayaq kay Iwãq nin het hengkãk tapiq dapat rés hak ley han neng.

=== Kayan, Baram (1990) ===
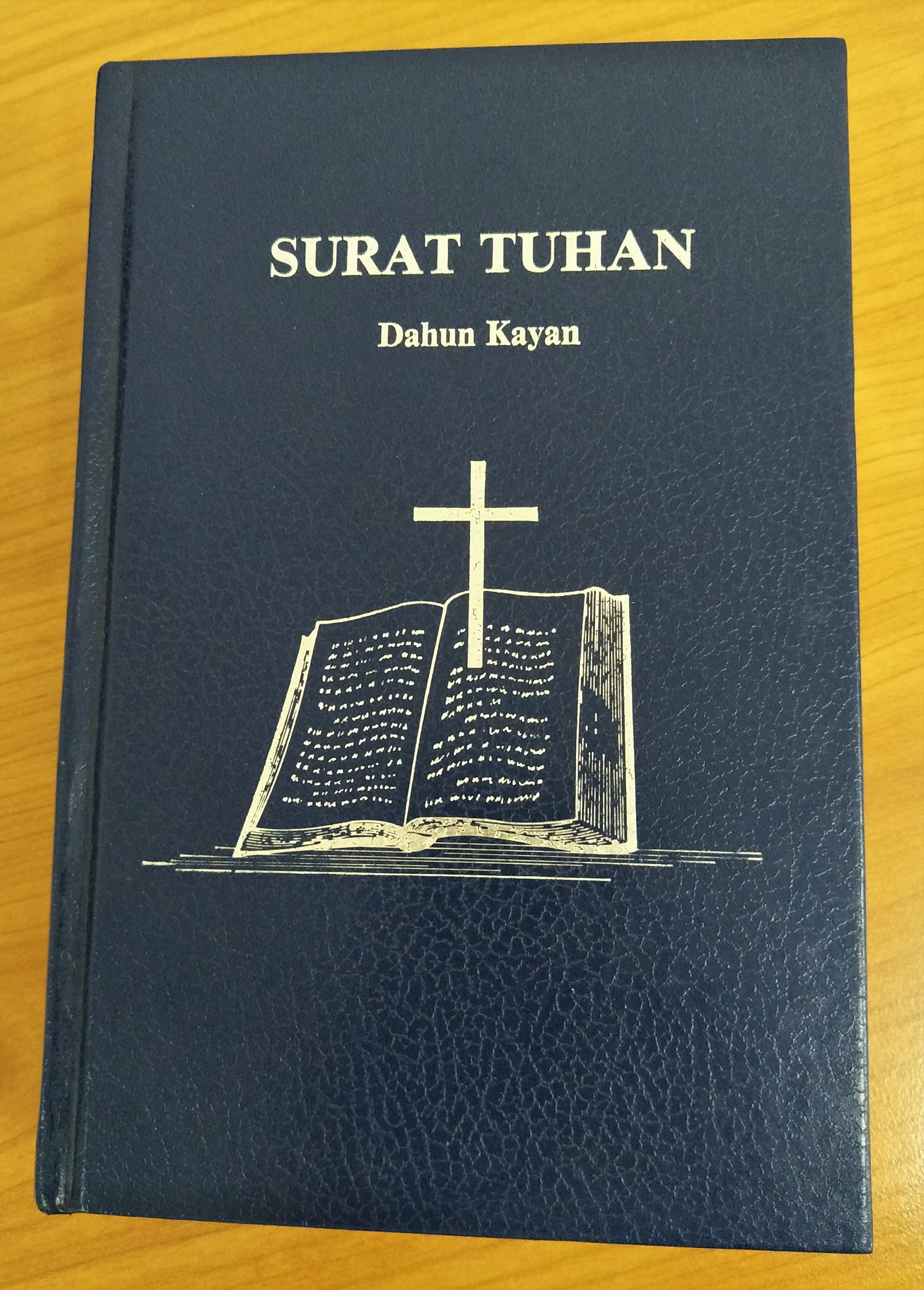
Kayan Bible (1990)

A translation of the Bible into Kayan, Baram language (Ethnologue: kys) spoken by the Kayan people of Sarawak has been available since 1990 and was first published by the Bible Society of Singapore, Malaysia and Brunei. Work is on-going for a revision of the Bible in the Kayan language.

Translation	John 3:16
Kayan, Baram Translation (1990)	Avin Allah kelalau nyalam kelunan té’ usun tana anih, iha’ nah Iha’ ma’uk Anak ji Na’ atih, ja hi-hi aleng nginah té’ Iha’, nusi’ daha’ tasa’, bi daha’ ala urip pa’en aleng sayu.

=== Kenyah (1971) ===
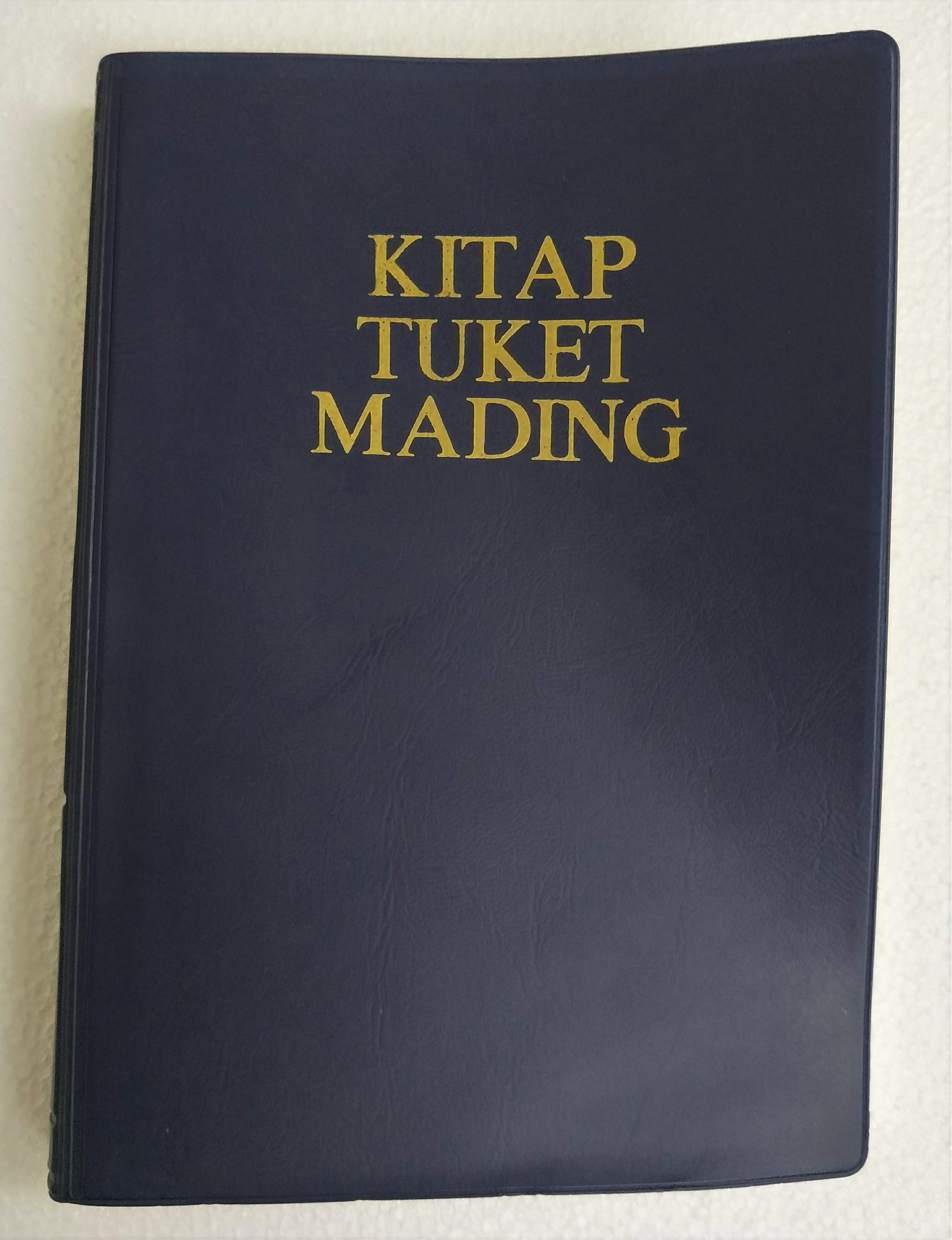
Kenyah New Testament (1971)

A translation of the New Testament in Mainstream Kenyah (Ethnologue: xkl) spoken by the Kenyah people of Sarawak and East Kalimantan have been available since 1971 and was first published by the Bible Society of Singapore, Malaysia and Brunei. Work has been ongoing since 2002 for a translation of the whole Bible by the Kenyah Translation Committee with technical support and assistance in linguistics, translation and software from the Summer Institute of Linguistics.

Translation	John 3:16
Kenyah New Testament (1971)	Bioʹ puyan Allah malaʹ neng ilu kelunan kusun tanaʹ ini, ina ukoʹ o mencai Anak ke iaʹ bang ca ina le milu, apan mung kelunan diaʹ ngelan neng ia abeʹ un tai matai penco, un sepuʹo ida ke alaʹ udip saheʹ kelineʹ iaʹ ngeriman

=== Penan (1974) ===
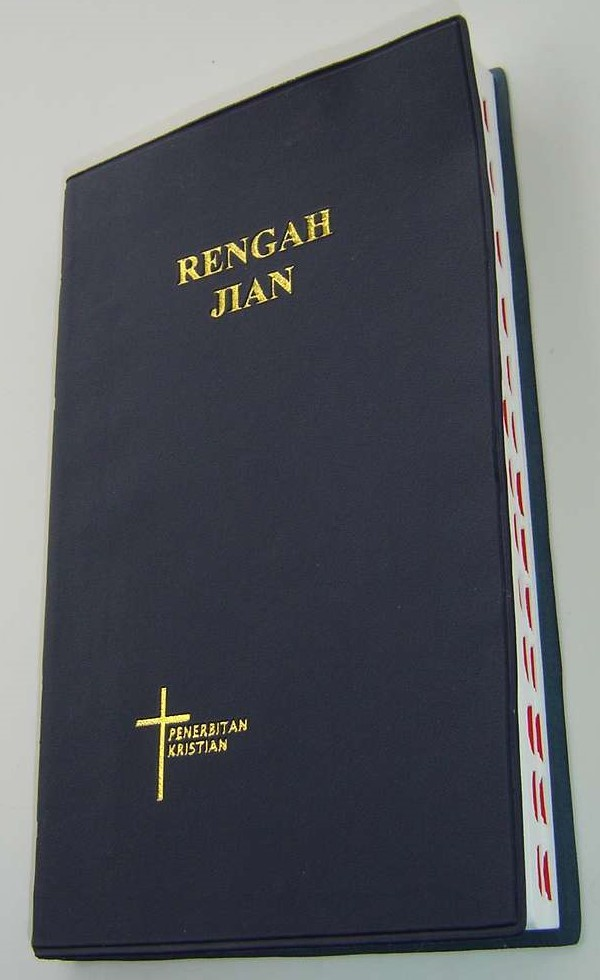
Penan New Testament

Translations of portions of the Bible in the Penan language (Ethnologue: pez) spoken by the Penan people have been available since 1974. A complete New Testament in Western Penan language (Ethnologue: pne) was completed and published in 2011 and is known as the Rengah Jian.

Translation	John 3:16
Rengah Jian (2011)	Uban ja'au penika Allah ngan kekat kelunan tong tana' iteu', inah Iah mena' Anak Néh éh jah de' ke' inah, dokoo' séé'-séé' éh ngelan tong Anak Néh, bé' éh matai bang néh omok alaa' urip pelinguh

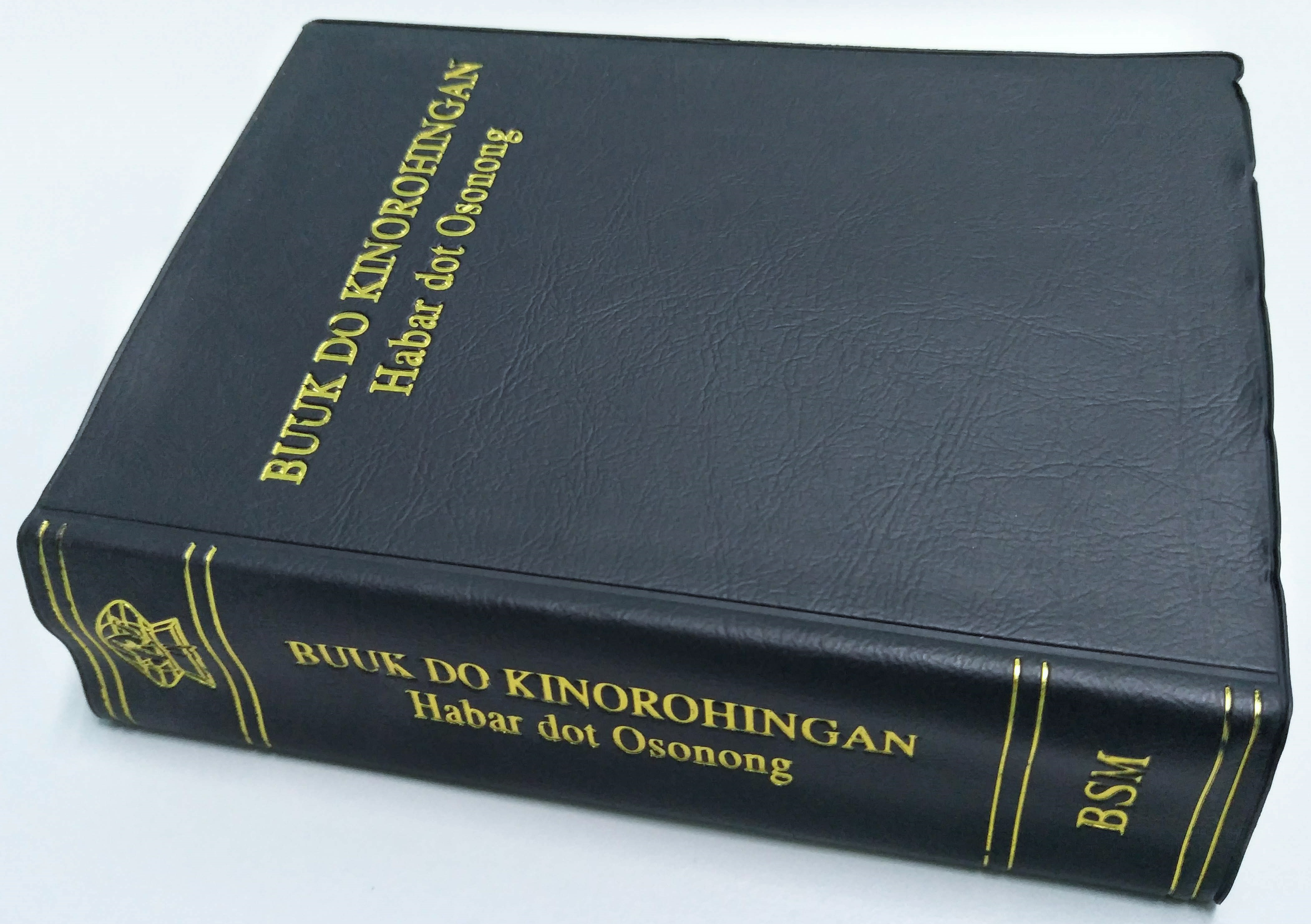
Dusun Bible (2007)

=== Dusun (1975) ===
While translations of portions of the Bible in the Dusunic languages have existed since 1975, work to translate a new translation of the Bible in the standard Dusun language spoken by the Dusun people of Sabah was initiated in 2001. Known as the Buuk Do Kinorohingan, it was published in 2007 by the Bible Society of Malaysia.

Translation	John 3:16
Buuk Do Kinorohingan (2007)	Tu' nosianan no kopio o Kinorohingan do tulun do hiti'd pomogunan, gisom do pinatahak dau i Tanak dau dit iso-iso', om pointikid-tikid do tulun di monongkuyaan dau om amu' no apatai, suwai ko' kaanu do koposion dit otopot kopio om i poingompus

=== Labuk Kinabatangan (1995) ===
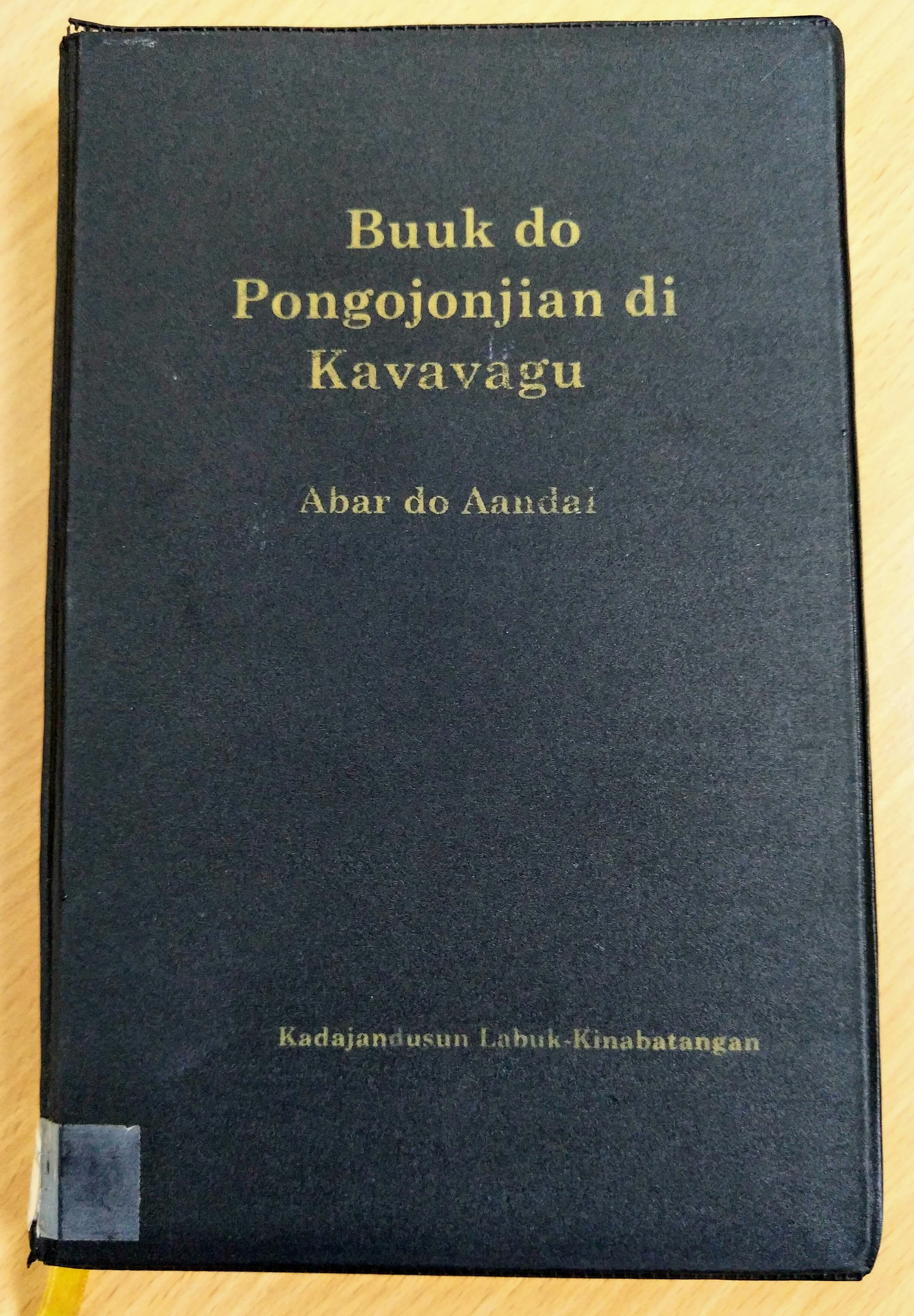
Labuk Kinabatangan New Testament (1995)

The New Testatment in the Labuk Kinabatangan language (Ethnologue: dtb) is known as the Buuk do Pongojonjian di Kavavagu was published by the International Bible Society in 1995.

Translation	John 3:16
Buuk do Pongojonjian di Kavavagu (1996 Edition)	Do au marong kojuu i Kinoringan di tongotulun siti vonuvo gosob do pinataak Oku Disido do apatai, do Iokuno i TanakJo tunggal, supaya isai-isai nopo aparsaya Dogo om kaanu do kovijaan diri auso koovion om aui obinasa i tatodjo.

=== Lun Bawang / Lundayeh (1982) ===
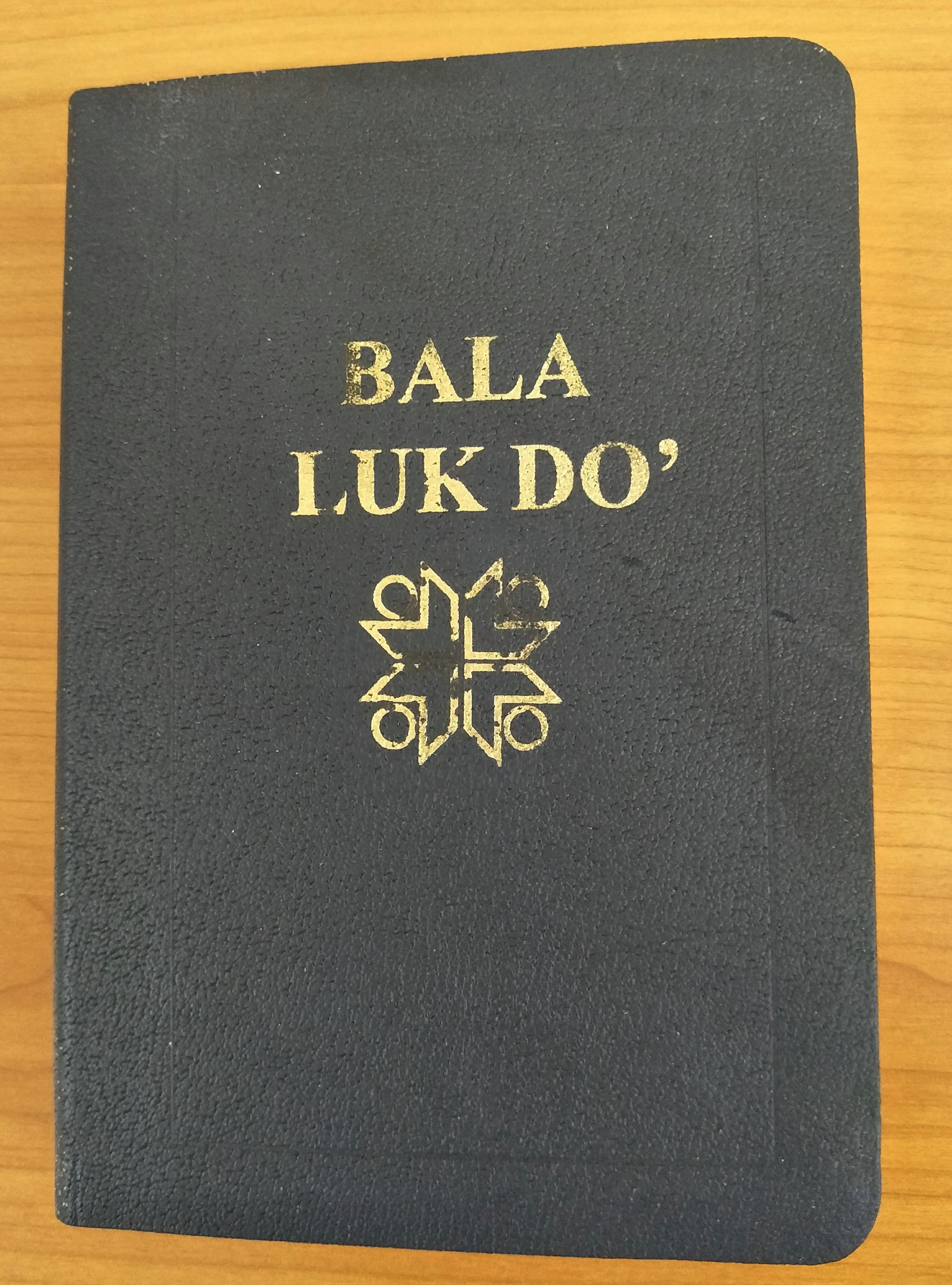
Lun Bawang/Lundayeh Bible (1982/1998)

The Bible in the Lun Bawang language (Ethnologue: lnd) known as the Bala Luk Do' was first translated and published in 1982 by the Bible Society of Singapore, Malaysia and Brunei. It was the first whole book published in the language of the Lun Bawang people who reside in the interior border region between Sabah, Sarawak, and Kalimantan. A revision of the Bala Luk Do' was completed and published in 1998.

Translation	John 3:16
Bala Luk Do' (1982)	Ngaceku Allah mawa kuan uang tana’ ini, pad Ieh nemaré Anak bulengNeh, idi idé’-idé luk manu Neneh na miak maté, iamo’ ieh ngalap ulun luk meruked

=== Murut Timugon (1998) ===
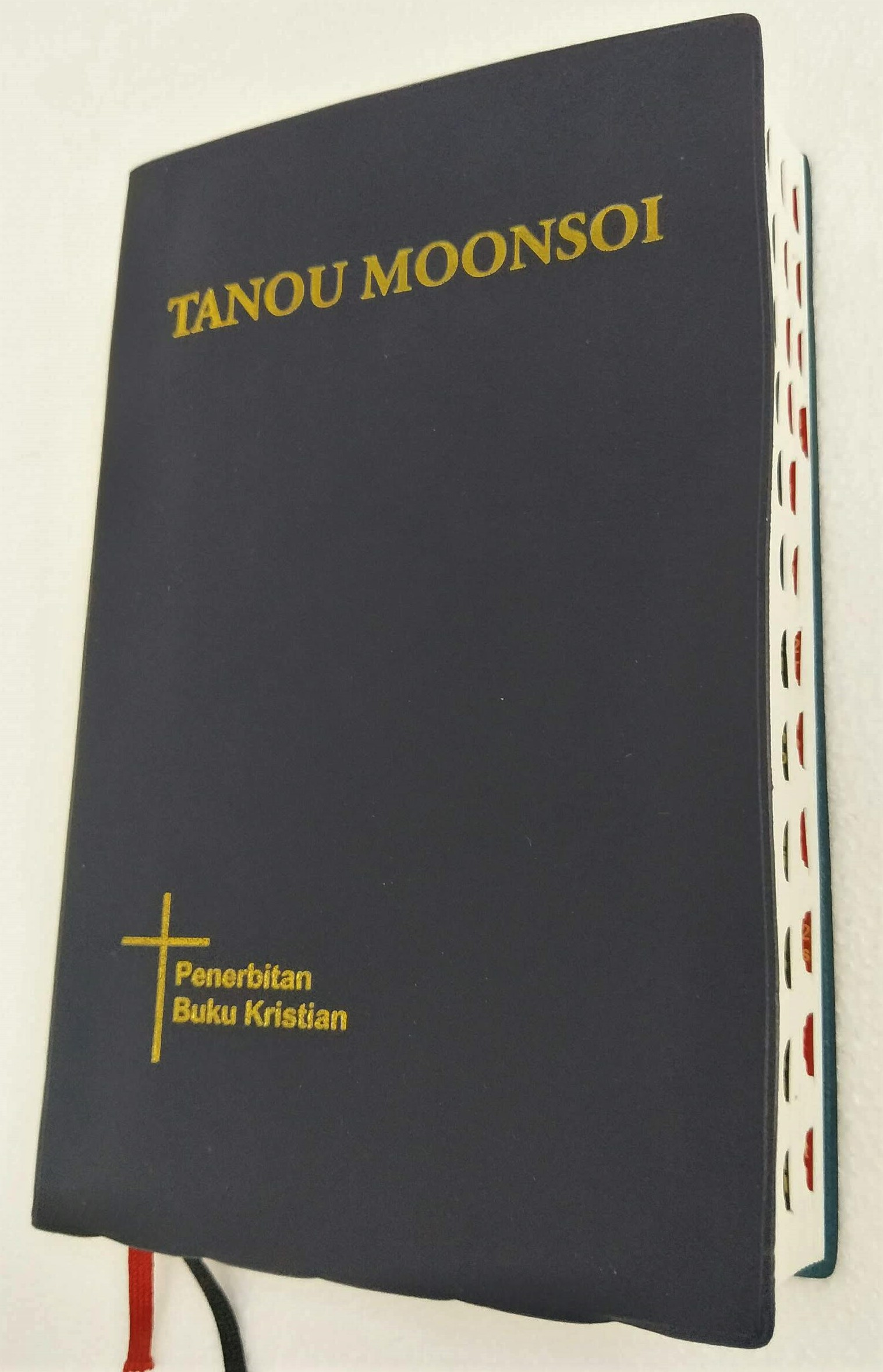
Timugon Murut Bible (2013)

The New Testament in Murut Timugon (Ethnologue: tih) spoken by the Murut people of Sabah was published in 1998 by the Bible Society of Malaysia. It is called the Nabantuan Bagu. The full Bible known as the Tanou Moonsoi Timugon was published in 2013 also by the Bible Society of Malaysia in both a Catholic and Protestant version.

Translation	John 3:16
Tanou Moonsoi Timugon (2013)	Sabap ra maayo kaga' guang ri Aki Kapuuno' ra ulun ru tana' ti, saboi nanaak Io ra Anak Langkuir Nano, maa' raginio moonong ulun ondo' mangintopot Riso kalo mapuso, kaa' mokoowot ra kaayagan mantilayun

=== Tahol / Tagal Murut (2003) ===
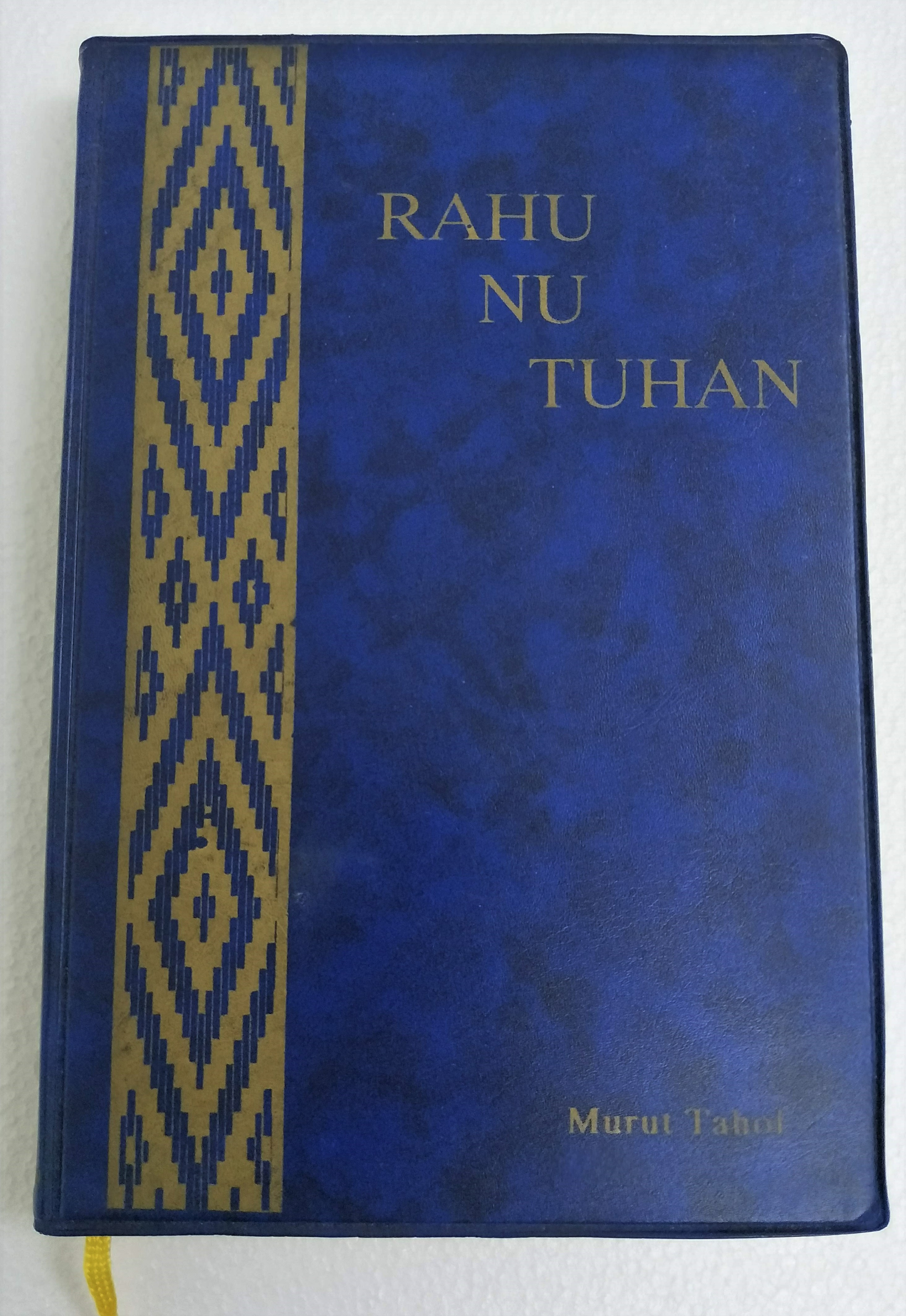
Tahol / Tagal Murut New Testament

The Bible in the language of the Murut people (Ethnologue: mvv) of southwestern Sabah and northeastern Sarawak known as the Rahu Nu Tuhan Aho Onsoi was published in 2003 by the Bible Society of Malaysia. The New Testament was published by the Philippine Bible Society in 1991 and is known as the Rahu Nu Tuhan.

Translation	John 3:16
Rahu Nu Tuhan Aho Onsoi (2003)	Nga maayo hua bonsoi asi' nu Ala ra ulun nu tana' hitu suku' io nanaak ra Anak no saumi hili aun-aun ulun angintopot rio ikaa aukuman io ya akaundut ra bayah otopot am ampus-ampus

=== Tombonuo (2002) ===
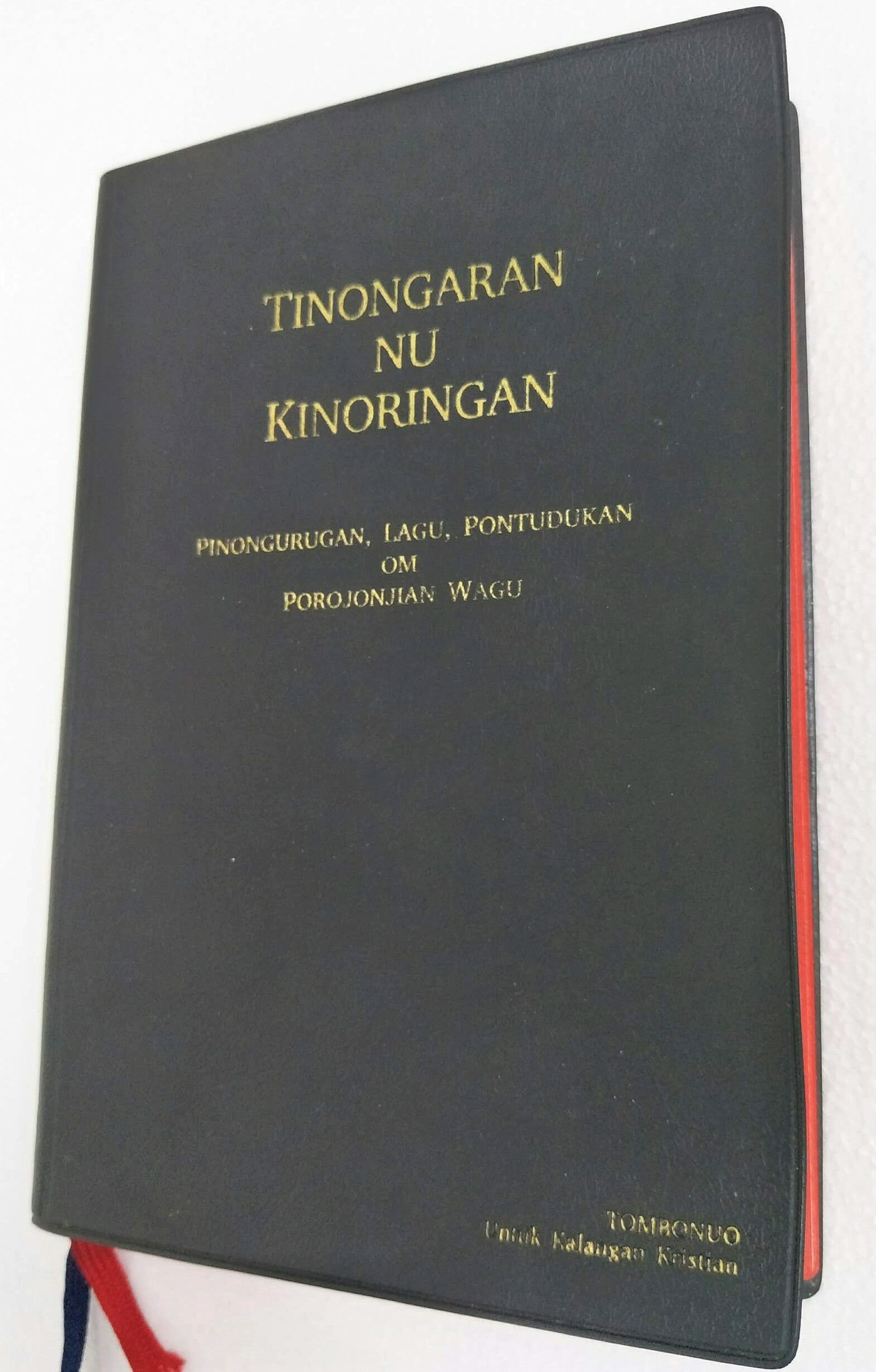
Tombonuo New Testament (2002)

The Bible in the Tombonuo language (Ethnologue: txa) of northern Sabah known as the Tinongaran Nu Kinoringan was published in 2002 by the Bible Society of Malaysia.

Translation	John 3:16
Tombonuo Translation (2002)	Pagka osamod sobana Kinoringan nu lobuw so wonuo tu, sinuu' Aku Niyo, ido yo Anak Niyo mian so wonuo tu, su' isai yo po poimaid so Aku, dai oinsaadan nu Kinoringan, sondiang ko taakan nu kowiawan musingkolaid.
