= DZV =

DZV or dzv may refer to:

- Dzv (trigraph), a Latin-script trigraph
- Doopsgezinde Zendings Vereeniging, mission association which sent H. C. Klinkert
- Short name for FC Dzerzhynets Voroshylovhrad
- Short name for the German Cigarette Association, a member of the Federation of German Industries
- Short name for the East-German Educational Administration, for which Johannes Stroux served as acting rector
