= Scottish Bible Society =

Scottish Bible Society (SBS), founded in 1809 as the Edinburgh Bible Society, amalgamated in 1861 with the Glasgow Bible Society (founded 1812) to form the National Bible Society of Scotland, is a Scottish Christian charity that exists to make the Bible available throughout the world.

The Scottish Bible Society arose as a separate organisation to the British & Foreign Bible Society over its desire to print Metrical Psalms as an additional book at the back of the Bible. At the time BFBS did not allow additional books to be added to the Bible.

It also acted as a missionary society that was involved in sending workers to countries such as China during the late Qing dynasty.

== Bibleworld ==
Bibleworld is the schools education department of the Scottish Bible Society. Since 1991, Bibleworld has been sharing the Bible with children and young people. Bibleworld used to operate as a 45 foot long mobile classroom which visited schools and churches throughout Scotland, called Bibleworld Mobile.

At the end of 2016 the Bibleworld Mobile classroom was retired after a decade of service and a new resource was sought that could continue to help churches build supportive links with schools and families in their communities. The next generation of Bibleworld is an after school resource designed to be used in book club format, called Bibleworld Books. It is designed to meet the requirements of the Scottish Curriculum for Excellence in creative and dynamic ways.

== Scots Gaelic ==
The New Testament was first translated into Scottish Gaelic by Rev James Stuart, minister of Killin, and published in 1767, and the full Bible was completed in 1801. The Metrical Psalms were produced in 1826. The Scottish Bible Society has overseen the revision and updating and printing of this Bible and the Metrical Psalms. Recently the Scots Gaelic Bible was revised by Donald Meek into modern orthography and printed with the Metrical Psalms in 1992. In 2002 an edition of the Scots Gaelic New Testament was produced as a diglot with the English New King James Version (NKJV) along with the 1826 Metrical Psalms, with updated orthography.

== New Gaelic Translation ==
Until recently, there was a project to translate the New Testament into modern Gaelic.

The Gospel of John (Soisgeul Eòin) was published in 2010, and released at the Gaelic Mod in Thurso.

In 2018, work was completed on a Gaelic New Testament which is available now on the YouVersion Bible App and is now available in print format too. It was complete over a decade through the involvement of a collaboration between the Scottish Bible Society, Church of Scotland, Free Church of Scotland, and other interested parties.

== See also ==
- Christianity in China
- List of Protestant missionaries in China
- Protestant missions in China 1807-1953
- Timeline of Chinese history
