= William Shellabear =

British scholar and missionary active in Malaya

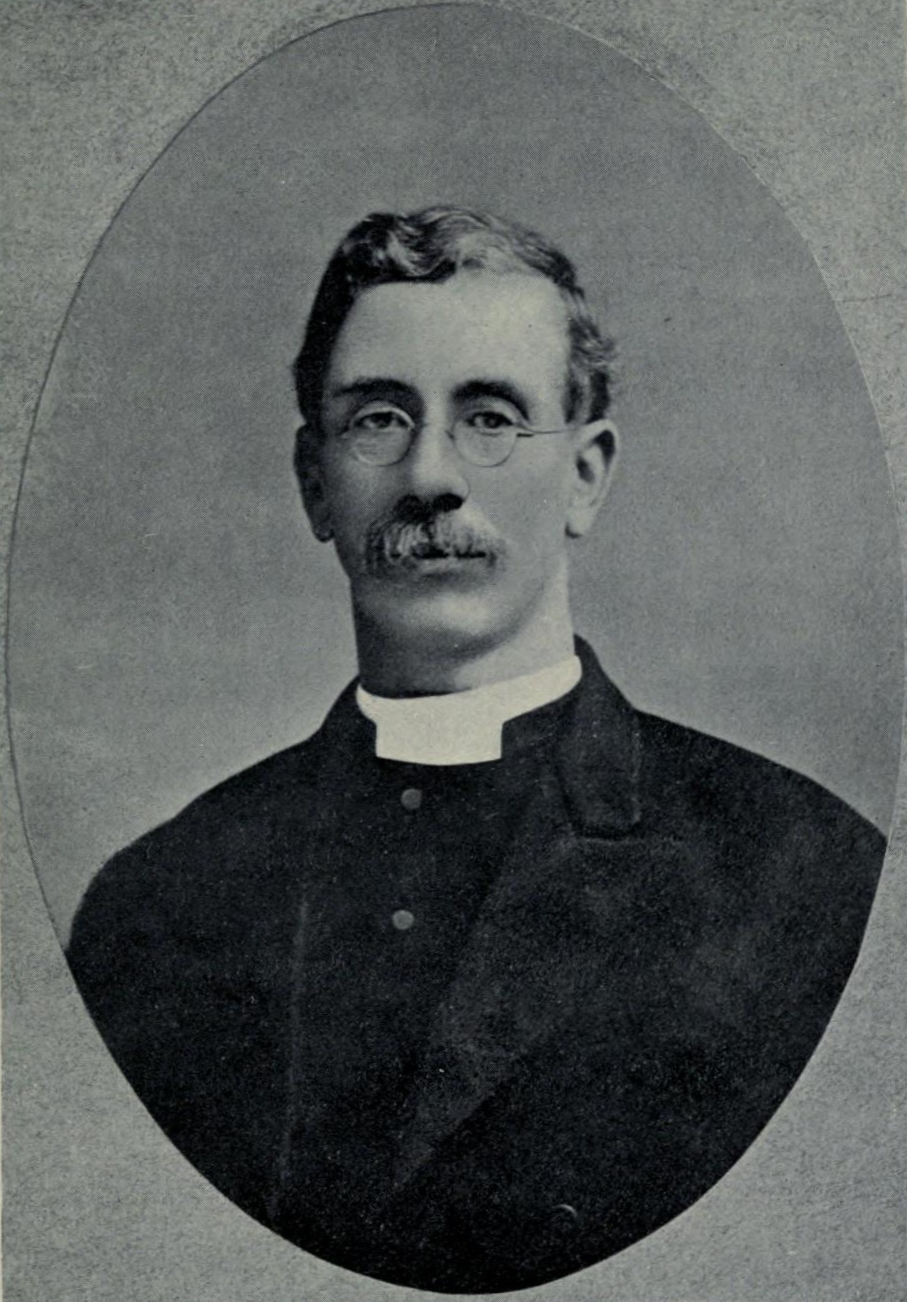

William Girdlestone Shellabear (1862–1947) was a "pioneer" scholar and missionary in British Malaya (today, part of Malaysia). He was known for both his appreciation of Muslim society and also his translation of the Bible into the Malay language.

== Life and career ==
W. G. Shellabear, as he was generally known, was born at Holkham Hall on 7 August 1862 in Norfolk, England, where his father was estate manager.

He first went to Malaya as a British soldier, then returned as a Methodist missionary, where he worked from 1891 to 1948. "He introduced and guided changes in attitudes towards Malays and Islam, which made it possible for Methodist missionaries to relate positively to Malays while maintaining the integrity of their evangelistic outreach." He helped Westerners appreciate "how Malay spirituality represented a genuine commitment to Islam, despite its failure to conform to the expectations of [Western] Orientalists". His appreciation of Malay language and culture made him promote Malay language schools, which brought him into disagreement with many missionaries who preferred to organise and teach at English-language schools.

He produced a voluminous amount of writings, some of which were aimed at Christian Malays, some for Muslim Malays, some for missionaries coming to Malaya, and some for scholars. These included Sejarah Melayu (Malay Annals), Hikayat Abdullah (The Life of Abdullah bin Abdul Kadir), a Malay hymnal, dictionary and grammar of Malay, and a translation of Pilgrim's Progress. He also collaborated with a Malay scholar, Sulaiman bin Muhammed Nur (also known as Sulaiman bin Muhammad Nor), in joint publications such as Kitab Kiliran Budi (The Book of Wisdom, a collection of proverbs) and Hikayat Hang Tuah (The Life of Hang Tuah). According to John Roxborogh, "[h]is grammar, dictionary, and Bible translation remained in print for decades".

His scholarly activities involved him in the Straits Philosophical Society, the Straits Branch of the Royal Asiatic Society (later known was the Malayan Branch of the Royal Asiatic Society and now known as the Malaysian Branch of the Royal Asiatic Society), and the faculty of Hartford Seminary.

Shellabear is the founder of MPH Group, a publishing house that was founded in Singapore in 1890 as the Amelia Bishop Press and then renamed in 1893 as the American Mission Press, in 1906 as the Methodist Publishing House, in 1927 as the Malaya Publishing House, and in 1963 as the Malaysia Publishing House. For some years he was the chief editor of the Methodist Publishing House and from 1906 he was the editor of that firm's book series, Malay Literature Series.

He was associated with the founding of the Straits Chinese Methodist Church, now the Kampong Kapor Methodist Church in Singapore.

== Personal life ==
Shellabear was married three times. He married his first wife, Fanny Marie (nee Kealy) (born 1895), the daughter of a medical practitioner, Dr John Kealy, in 1886. They had one son, Hugh Percy Shellabear (1891-1972), who in 1947 would be reported as working a general practitioner in Reading, Pennsylvania. Fanny died after a long illness on 15 March 1895.

In 1897 he married Elizabeth Emmeline "Emma" (nee Ferris) (born circa 1862), a Canadian missionary with the Woman's Foreign Missionary Society of the Methodist Episcopal Church. In November of that year their first daughter Margaret Anna Shellabear (1897-1972) was born. After marrying, the latter was known as Margaret Gulland and in 1947 she was the principal of the Methodist Girls School in Klang, Malaya. Emma died in 1922.

In 1924 he married Emma Naomi (nee Ruth) (1886-1972), a missionary to Java who was then studying in Madison, New Jersey.

William Shellabear had a second daughter, Fanny Shellabear. After marrying she was known as Fanny Blasdell and in 1947 she and her husband, Robert Allen Blasdell (1892-1986), were working as Methodist missionaries in Malacca.

After retiring from the Hartford Seminary, Shellabear continued his literary work until shortly before he died in Hartford, Connecticut on 16 January 1947.

== Awards ==
- 1913: Doctor of Divinity (honoris causa) - Ohio Wesleyan University

== Works written, edited or translated by Shellabear ==
=== Works in Malay ===
- 1901 (trans.) Aturan Sembahyang (The book of worship). American Mission Press.
- 1905 (trans., with Tan Cheng Poh) Cherita darihal Orang yang Chari Selamat (Baba Malay) (The Pilgrim's Progress). American Mission Press.
- 1907 Pelajaran dri hal Isa Al Maseh (Teaching about Jesus Christ). Singapore: Methodist Publishing House.
- 1908 (ed., with Sulaiman bin Muhammed Nur) Hikayat Hang Tuah (The life of Hang Tuah). Singapore: Malaya Publishing House.
- 1909 (ed., with Sulaiman bin Muhammed Nur) Kitab Kiliran Budi (The book of wisdom—a collection of Malay proverbs). Methodist Publishing House, Singapore.
- 1913 (trans., with Chew Chin Yong & Sulaiman bin Muhammed Nur) Perjanjian Bharu Bahasa Peranakan (Baba Malay) (The New Testament, Peranakan language). British and Foreign Bible Society & Bible Society of Singapore.
- 1915 (ed.) Hikayat Abdullah (The life of Abdullah). Singapore: Methodist Publishing House.
- 1915 (ed., with Sulaiman bin Muhammed Nur) Hikayat Sri Rama (The life of Sri Rama). Journal of the Straits Branch of the Royal Asiatic Society, no. 71.
- 1915 (ed.) Hikayat Seri Rama (The Ramayana epic). Royal Asiatic Society. Malay version found in Bodleian Library.
- 1917 Sha'ir Puji Pujian (The hymnal). Singapore: Methodist Book Room. Later editions through 1947.
- 1918 Kitab Undang Undang Methodist (The Methodist book of discipline). Singapore: Methodist Publishing House.
- 1921 Hikajat Perhimpoenan Methodist (The history of Methodism). Singapore: Methodist Publishing House.
- 1924 (ed.) Sejarah Melayu (History of the Malays). Singapore: Methodist Publishing House.
- 1948 Cherita Ibrahim (The story of Abraham). Singapore: Methodist Mission.
- 1948 Sha'ir Nabi Yang Berpengasihan (The story of the beloved prophet). Singapore: Methodist Mission.
- 1949 Beberapa Sha'ir dri hal Kerajaan Allah (The story of God's kingdom). Singapore: Methodist Mission.
- 1949 Cherita Yang Sempurna (The perfect life). Singapore: Methodist Mission.
- 1949 Hikayat Beni Israel (The history of Israel). Singapore: Methodist Mission.
- 1949 Hikayat Musa (The story of Moses). Singapore: Methodist Mission.
- 1949 Hikayat Ruth (The story of Ruth). Singapore: Methodist Mission.
- 1949 Hikayat Yusuf (The story of Joseph). Singapore: Methodist Mission.
- 1949 Tafsir Injil Lukas (A commentary on Gospel of Luke). Singapore: Methodist Mission.
- 1949 Tafsir Yahya (A commentary on John). Singapore: Methodist Mission.
- 1955 (trans.) Cherita darihal Orang yang Menchari Selamat (Standard Malay) (The pilgrim's progress). Singapore: Methodist Mission.

=== Works in English ===
The Triglot Vocabulary, Sixth Edition (1913): originally compiled by William Girdlestone Shellabear and the Rev. B. F. West, not credited in this edition.

- 1891 (with B. F. West) Triglot Vocabulary (English, Chinese, Malay). Singapore: American Mission Press. Later editions by Methodist Publishing House.
- 1898 "Some Old Malay Manuscripts." Journal of the Straits Branch of the Royal Asiatic Society.
- 1899 Practical Malay Grammar. Singapore: American Mission Press.
- 1901 "The Evolution of Malay Spelling." Journal of the Straits Branch of the Royal Asiatic Society.
- 1902 Malay-English Vocabulary. Singapore: American Mission Press. Later editions by Methodist Publishing House, 1912, 1925.
- 1913 "Baba Malay." Journal of the Straits Branch of the Royal Asiatic Society, no. 65.
- 1913 "The Influence of Islam on the Malays: An Essay Presented to the Straits Philosophical Society." Singapore: Methodist Publishing House.
- 1915 Mohammedanism as Revealed in Its Literature. Singapore: Methodist Publishing House.
- 1916 English-Malay Dictionary. Singapore: Methodist Publishing House.
- 1917 "Introduction to the Hikayat Sri Rama." Journal of the Straits Branch of the Royal Asiatic Society, April, pp. 181–207.
- 1918 (trans.) Autobiography of Munshi Abdullah. Singapore: Methodist Publishing House.
- 1919 "Christian Literature for Malaysia." Muslim World 9, no. 4.
- 1919 Islam's Challenge to Methodism. New York: Board of Foreign Missions.
- 1925 "The Moslem World, Why We Need It." Muslim World 15, no. 1.
- 1930 "An Exposure of Counterfeiters." Muslim World 20, no. 4.
- 1931 "Can a Moslem Translate the Koran?" Muslim World 21, no. 3.
- 1931 "Is Sale's Koran Reliable?" Muslim World 21, no. 2.
- 1932 "The Meaning of the Word 'Spirit' as Used in the Koran." Muslim World 22, no. 4.
- 1933 "A Malay Treatise on Popular Sufi Practices." The Macdonald Presentation Volume. Princeton: Princeton Univ. Press.
- 1939 "Dr. Kraemer on Islam." Muslim World 29, no. 1.
- 1945 (with Vernon E. Hendershott) Dictionary of Standard Malay. Mountain View, Calif.: Pacific Press Publishing Association.
- 1946 "The Gospel for the Malays." Muslim World 36, no. 3.

== See also ==
- Bible translations into Malay

== Sources ==
- Hunt, Robert A. 1996. William Shellabear: A Biography. Kuala Lumpur, Malaysia : University of Malaya Press.
- Hunt, Robert A. 1998. "Shellabear, William Girdlestone". Biographical Dictionary of Christian Missions, ed. By Gerald Anderson, p. 617 . New York: Simon & Schuster.
- Roxborogh, John. 2000. "Shellabear, William Girdlestone." Evangelical Dictionary of World Missions, ed by A. Scott Moreau, p. 871. Grand Rapids: Baker Books and Carlisle, Cumbria: Paternoster.
- Satari, Paul Russ. 2001. "Shellabear, William Girdlestone." A Dictionary of Asian Christianity, ed. By Scott Sunquist, p. 759. Grand Rapids: Eerdmans.
