= H. C. Klinkert =

Hillebrandus Cornelius Klinkert (11 June 1829 – 20 November 1913) was a Dutch Mennonite missionary and translator. He was born in Amsterdam and worked as an engineer in a machine factory at Rotterdam and on a Rhine barge before he contacted the DZV (Doopsgezinde Zendings Vereeniging) in 1851 with a request to be sent as a missionary. Klinkert was also known for his ability to translate the Bible into different dialects of Malay so that the Javanese people could access the Gospel, and completed his first entire translation at the end of 1878.

== Education ==
Klinkert was educated as a surveyor, and received training in the seminary of the Nederlandsche Zendeling Genootschap (NZG) at Rotterdam for his future missionary service. In February 1856 before Klinkert had finished his schooling, seminary director H. Hiebink requested that the DZV withdraw him. Klinkert was an older student and it was therefore more difficult for him to accept guidance but S. Hoekstra who was the pastor of the Rotterdam Mennonite church would defend him. The problem was settled and they would land in Batavia, Java in 1856. He would arrive in Jepara early in October where he would study with Pieter Jansz (missionary) (1820–1904). When Klinkert was accepted by the DZV to work alongside Jansz in October 1863, he took two years to study the language before he started his work on Bible translation.

== Family ==
Klinkert married a Eurasian woman, Wilhelmina Louis Kahle on 5 October 1857 who couldn’t speak Dutch but helped him contact more Malay speaking locals. Klinkert and his wife moved to Semarang at the end of May 1859 for a temporary stay. Klinkert’s missionary work and translating would take his family all over Java for the next several years until he arrived in Tanjungpinang at Riau in June 1864 where he lived with his family for two and a half years under terrible conditions. Because of the illness and isolation brought about by these conditions, he informed the NBG that he could do his translations in the Netherlands. Klinkert's wife was suffering from tuberculosis when they moved to Amsterdam in mid-1867. Shortly after she died in 1870, Klinkert married Willemina Samuela Diderika Roering (1844–1929) who brought a child of her own into the union. They would have ten more children together.

== Missionary work ==
After some studying with Jansz, Klinkert took over a small Javanese school that Jansz was leading. They also visited nearby villages together on horseback where Klinkert started to lead house services in the Malay language. While in Semarang, Klinkert started a new missionary effort there in 1863 and would be selected to work alongside Jansz with most of their work focused on translating the Bible. Klinkert founded a general newsweekly in 1860 called Slompret Melaijoe (The Malay Trumpet), which existed until 1911. Once his Bible translation work was completed in 1878 back in the Netherlands, the Dutch Bible Society drew his attention to a teaching position at the Municipal Institute for Education of Civil Servants for the East Indies in Leiden. His profession was a lecturer and he worked at the Institute, which merged with the University of Leiden in 1890, until 1904, teaching Malay and literature to first and second year students. Most of Klinkert’s travels and missionary work led him back to translating the Bible. He wanted the Gospel to be available to all and made it his mission to translate the Bible into Malay, which he completed in 1878. He collected and published data about indigenous medical treatment and would continue to do linguistic work until he was quite elderly.

== Bible translation ==
Klinkert's wife found the version of Melchior Leydecker difficult to understand, so Klinkert began translating Old Testament stories and later parts of the New Testament into the local Malay dialect while he was in Jepara. At the end of 1859 he was going to translate the whole New Testament into that language spoken by many different races. The fact that other translations had too many faults inspired Klinkert to do this. Although he received little support, he was still able to translate the four Gospels in 1861 through his own funding, and to finish the rest of the New Testament two years later with the help of a grant he received from the Nederlands Bijbel Genootschap (Dutch Bible Society). In 1866, Klinkert started to give his full attention to translating the Bible. He was going to translate the Bible into a form of pure Malay. His translation into pure Malay replaced Leijdecker’s older one everywhere except for the Maluku Islands. In 1876 Klinkert decided to try to complete his full translation in one year through direct contact with the Malaysians. He would return just over half a year later and would complete the full translation of the Bible in Latin characters shortly after that. Klinkert revised his Malay translation into Arabic characters for the Bible Society in 1886.

In the Old Testament Klinkert used Allah as a translation for the singular Hebrew Elohim, and used ilah, as well as dewa, and berhala for plural gods. Klinkert made these theological decisions without a good knowledge of Hebrew. Klinkert knew that a good translation was only possible with the cooperation of others, but he felt easily insulted when others critiqued his work.

== List of works ==
Dictionaries:

- Nieuw nederlandsch-maleisch woorderboek
- Nieuw maleisch-nederlandsch woordenboek met arabisch karakter, naar de beste en laatste bronnen bewerkt
- Nieuw Maleisch-Nederlandsch zawoordenboek, ten behoove van hen, die het Maleisch met Latijnsch karakter beoefenen
- Maleisch-nederduitsch woordenboek
- Facsimile’s van eenige maleische handschriften : ten dienste van hen, die zich in het lezen van maleische-arabische letterschrift willen oefenen
- De Pelandoek dijinaka of Het guitige dwerghert : naar een ander Maleisch handschrift voor de pers bewerkt
- Spraakleer can het Maleisch
- Wasijat jang baroe ija-itoe segala kitab perdjanjian baroe atawa indjil toehan kita Jesoes Kristoes
