= Hendrik Cornelis Kruyt =

Dutch writer and missionary

H. C. Kruyt
- Born: Hendrik Cornelis Kruyt; April 27, 1862; Semarang, Dutch East Indies
- Died: 1922; Paris, France
- Occupations: Missionary and writer
- Years active: 1884–1892
- Spouse: Wilhemnina Kruyt–de Ligt

Hendrik Cornelis Kruyt (27 April 1864—1922), was a Dutch writer and missionary. He was the first person sent to spread Protestant Christianity in Karo, North Sumatra. His work in Karo did not last long, as he later decided to quit the mission, leaving from the Indies until his death in 1922.

== Early life ==
Hendrik was born in Amsterdam, Netherland on January 10, 1834 and died in Semarang, Central Java in 1922, as the second son of the missionary Jan Kruyt and his wife Dorothea Johanna van der Linden. His brother Albert Christian Kruyt became known as the developer of ethno-sociological method in spreading Christianity. Hendrik spent his childhood in Java, before being sent to the Netherlands to receive an education at the Netherlands Missionary Society (NZG) School of Mission at the age of 11.

== Placement in Minahasa ==
After completing his education as a missionary, Kruyt was sent back to the Indies in 1884 along with his wife, Wilhemnina de Ligt. Hendrik asked to be placed in Java and expressed his desire to be "closer to the family" and to lead a congregation, just like his father. However, the NZG board could not find a suitable place for him in Java, and instead he was sent to Minahasa as a teacher and principal in Tomohon. Disappointed with this decision, Kruyt requested that his placement in Tomohon be temporary and requested that the council find him a job in Java. He eventually settled for 4 years there.

== Arrival in Sumatra ==
In April 1889, the council informed him of the possibility of his transfer from Minahasa and decided that Sumatra was the right place for him. On the other hand, Kruyt was only willing to be placed for a temporary period, and asked the board to not override his request to be placed in Java. He also refused to be exchanged with a tobacco company which operated in Deli, Deli Company, stating that he "remains a missionary of the NZG." The board repeatedly assured him that the company would only pay the financial wage, and they would not be his boss.

Kruyt avoided alcohol, cigarettes, even tea and coffee all his life. He claimed that even if he had "high sense of antipathy" (Note: He refers tobacco as "that weed".) for tobacco, it does not mean he had a bad relationship with the tobacco planters there. He was not concerned with the tobacco plantations used by others, unless it involves the mission and colonization of the land of the people where he worked.
