= Albert Christian Kruyt =

Dutch missionary (1869–1949)

- Albertus Christiaan Kruyt
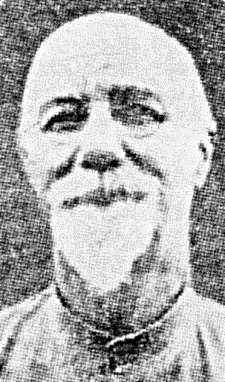
- Kruyt in his final years
- Born: Albertus Christiaan Kruijt; 10 October 1869; Mojowarno, Jombang, Dutch East Indies
- Died: 19 January 1949 (aged 79); The Hague, Netherlands
- Occupations: Missionary; ethnographer; theologian; author

Philosophical work
- School: Reformed, Calvinist
- Notable works: De Bare'e-sprekende Toradja's van Midden-Celebes

Albert Christian Kruyt (Dutch: Albertus Christiaan Kruyt; 10 October 1869 – 19 January 1949) was a Dutch Calvinist missionary, ethnographer and theologian who pioneered Christianity in Poso, Indonesia.

Born in Mojowarno, East Java, in 1869, Kruyt grew up in a missionary family and went to the Netherlands for education in 1877. Returning to the Indies in 1890, he was stationed in Gorontalo. The Nederlandsch Zendelinggenootschap (NZG, Netherlands Missionary Society) sent him to establish a new mission in Poso in 1892. Despite early setbacks, the first baptism occurred in 1909, and the number of converts grew steadily. His mission expanded through the highlands to the Gulf of Bone by the 1920s. Elected a corresponding member of the Royal Netherlands Academy of Arts and Sciences in 1898, Kruyt resigned in 1932 but became a regular member in 1933. Kruyt left the Dutch East Indies in 1932 and died in The Hague in 1949.

Kruyt is known for his ethno-sociological approach, believing that understanding local cultures was essential for successful missionary work. He argued that missionaries must understand the link between thought and community life to win hearts and preferred voluntary conversions over coercion. Kruyt is regarded as a leading theorist, missionary, and ethnographer of the early 20th century. His mission in Poso and Central Sulawesi was a significant success. His works on ethnography and evangelism are highly valued, especially the book he co-authored with Nicolaus Adriani, De Bare'e-sprekende Toradja's van Midden-Celebes (The Bare'e speaking Toraja of Central Sulawesi), which remains a key ethnological resource.
