= Headhunting =

Practice of hunting a human and collecting the severed head after killing the victim

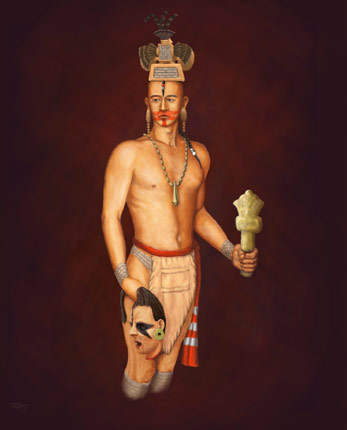
Digital painting of a Mississippian-era priest, with a ceremonial flint mace and a severed head, based on a repousse copper plate.

Headhunting is the practice of hunting a human and collecting the severed head after killing the victim. More portable body parts (such as ear, nose, or scalp) can be taken as trophies, instead. Headhunting has been practiced by many cultures throughout the world.

The headhunting practice has been the subject of intense study within the anthropological community, where scholars try to assess and interpret its social roles, functions, and motivations. Anthropological writings explore themes in headhunting that include mortification of the rival, ritual violence, cosmological balance, the display of manhood, cannibalism, dominance over the body and soul of his enemies in life and afterlife, as a trophy and proof of killing (achievement in hunting), show of greatness, prestige by taking on a rival's spirit and power, and as a means of securing the services of the victim as a slave in the afterlife.

Today's scholars generally agree that headhunting's primary function was ritual and ceremonial. It was part of the process of structuring, reinforcing, and defending hierarchical relationships between communities and individuals. Some experts theorize that the practice stemmed from the belief that the head contained the victim's "soul matter" or life force, which could be harnessed through its capture.

== Austronesia ==
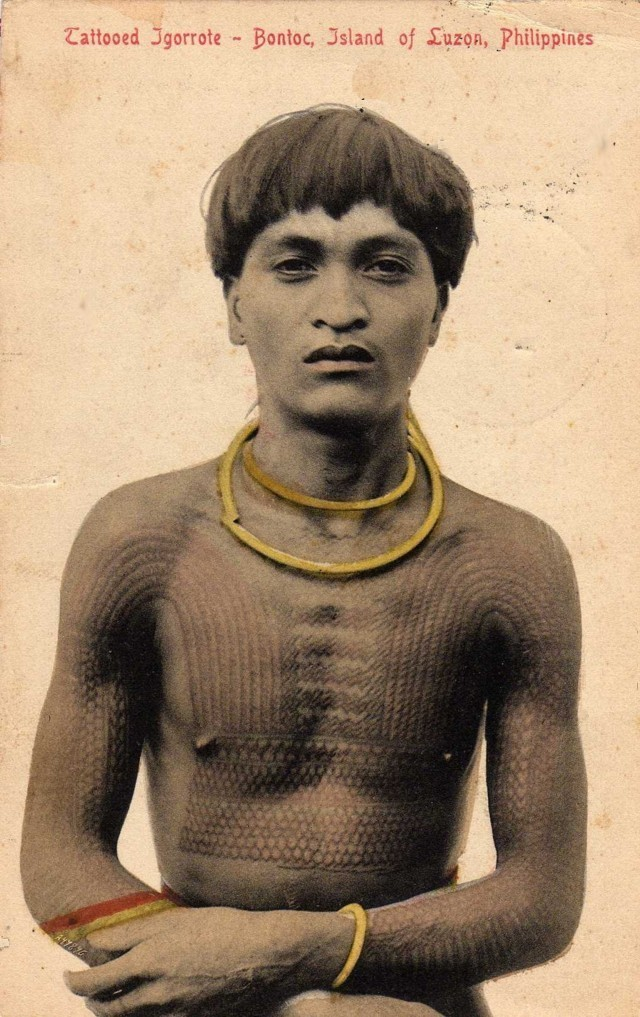
A 1908 photo of a Bontoc warrior bearing a headhunter's chaklag chest tattoo

Among the various Austronesian peoples, head-hunting raids were strongly tied to the practice of tattooing. In head-hunting societies, tattoos were records of how many heads the warriors had taken in battle, and was part of the initiation rites into adulthood. The number and location of tattoos, therefore, were indicative of a warrior's status and prowess.

=== Indonesia and Malaysia ===
In Southeast Asia, anthropological writings have explored headhunting and other practices of the Dayak, Nias, Wana, Sumba, and Mappurondo tribes. Among these groups, headhunting was usually a ritual activity rather than an act of war or feuding. A warrior would take a single head. Headhunting acted as a catalyst for the cessation of personal and collective mourning for the community's dead. Ideas of manhood and marriage were encompassed in the practice, and the taken heads were highly prized. Other reasons for headhunting included capture of enemies as slaves, looting of valuable properties, intra and inter-ethnic conflicts, and territorial expansion.

Italian anthropologist and explorer Elio Modigliani visited the headhunting communities in South Nias (an island to the west of Sumatra) in 1886; he wrote a detailed study of their society and beliefs. He found that the main purpose of headhunting was the belief that, if a man owned another person's skull, his victim would serve as a slave of the owner for eternity in the afterlife. Human skulls were a valuable commodity. Headhunting ceased on Nias island during the early 20th century following voluntary mass-conversions to Christianity.

Headhunting was practiced among Sumba people until the early 20th century. It was done only in large war parties. When the men hunted wild animals, by contrast, they operated in silence and secrecy. The skulls collected were hung on the skull tree erected in the center of village.

Kenneth George wrote about annual headhunting rituals that he observed among the Mappurondo religious minority, an upland tribe in the southwest part of the Indonesian island of Sulawesi. Heads are not taken; instead, surrogate heads in the form of coconuts are used in a ritual ceremony. The ritual, called pangngae, takes place at the conclusion of the rice-harvesting season. It functions to bring an end to communal mourning for the deceased of the past year; express intercultural tensions and polemics; allow for a display of manhood; distribute communal resources; and resist outside pressures to abandon Mappurondo ways of life.

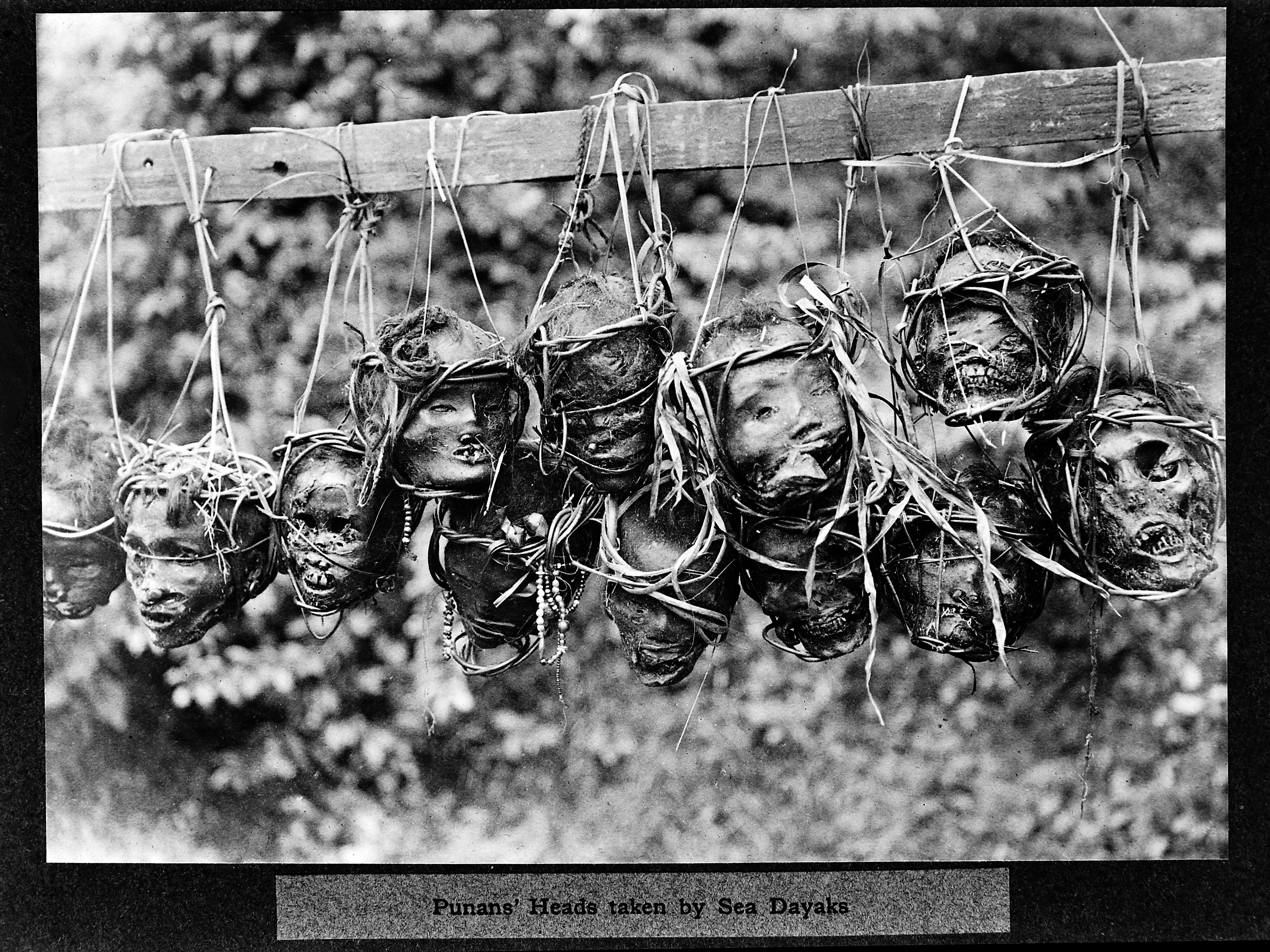
Punan Bah heads taken by Sea Dayaks

In Sarawak, the north-western region of the island of Borneo, the first "White Rajah" James Brooke and his descendants established a dynasty. They eradicated headhunting in the hundred years before World War II. Before Brooke's arrival, the Iban had migrated from the middle Kapuas region into the upper Batang Lupar river region by fighting and displacing the small existing tribes, such as the Seru and Bukitan. Another successful migration by the Iban was from the Saribas region into the Kanowit area in the middle of the Batang Rajang river, led by the famous Mujah "Buah Raya". They fought and displaced such tribes as the Kanowit and Baketan.

Brooke first encountered the headhunting Iban of the Saribas-Skrang in Sarawak at the Battle of Betting Maru in 1849. He gained the signing of the Saribas Treaty with the Iban chief of that region, who was named Orang Kaya Pemancha Dana "Bayang". Subsequently, the Brooke dynasty expanded their territory from the first small Sarawak region to the present-day state of Sarawak. They enlisted the Malay, Iban, and other natives as a large unpaid force to defeat and pacify any rebellions in the states. The Brooke administration prohibited headhunting (ngayau in Iban language) and issued penalties for disobeying the Rajah-led government decree. During expeditions sanctioned by the Brooke administration, they allowed headhunting. The natives who participated in Brooke-approved punitive expeditions were exempted from paying annual tax to the Brooke administration and/or given new territories in return for their service. There were intra-tribal and intertribal headhunting.

The most famous Iban warrior to resist the authority of the Brooke administration was Libau "Rentap". The Brooke government had to send three successive punitive expeditions in order to defeat Rentapi at his fortress on the top of Sadok Hill. Brooke's force suffered major defeats during the first two expeditions. During the third and final expedition, Brooke built a large cannon called Bujang Sadok (Prince of Sadok Mount) to rival Rentap's cannon nicknamed Bujang Timpang Berang (The One Arm Bachelor) and made a truce with the sons of a famous chief, who supported Rentap in not recognizing the government of Brooke due to his policies.

The Iban performed a third major migration from upper Batang Ai region in the Batang Lupar region into the Batang Kanyau (Embaloh) onwards the upper Katibas and then to the Baleh/Mujong regions in the upper Batang Rajang region. They displaced the existing tribes of the Kayan, Kajang, Ukit, etc. The Brooke administration sanctioned the last migrations of the Iban, and reduced any conflict to a minimum. The Iban conducted sacred ritual ceremonies with special and complex incantations to invoke god's blessings, which were associated with headhunting. An example was the Bird Festival in the Saribas/Skrang region and Proper Festival in the Baleh region, both required for men of the tribes to become effective warriors.

During the Japanese occupation of British Borneo during the Second World War, headhunting was revived among the natives. The Sukarno-led Indonesian forces fought against the formation of the Federation of Malaysia. Forces of Malaya, Singapore, Sabah and Sarawak fought in addition, and headhunting was observed during the communist insurgency in Sarawak and what was then Malaya. The Iban were noted for headhunting, and were later recognised as good rangers and trackers during military operations, during which they were awarded fourteen medals of valour and honour.

Since 1997, serious inter-ethnic violence has erupted in Indonesian Kalimantan, involving the indigenous Dayak peoples and migrants from the island of Madura. Events have included the 1997 Sanggau Ledo riots, the 1999 Sambas riots, and the 2001 Sampit conflict. During the Sampit conflict in Central Kalimantan, which began in the town of Sampit, at least 400 Madurese were killed and tens of thousands were forced to flee. Some Madurese bodies were decapitated in a ritual reminiscent of the Dayak headhunting tradition.

The Moluccans (especially Alfurs in Seram), an ethnic group of mixed Austronesian-Papuan origin living in the Maluku Islands, were fierce headhunters until the Dutch colonial rule in Indonesia suppressed the practice.

=== Melanesia ===
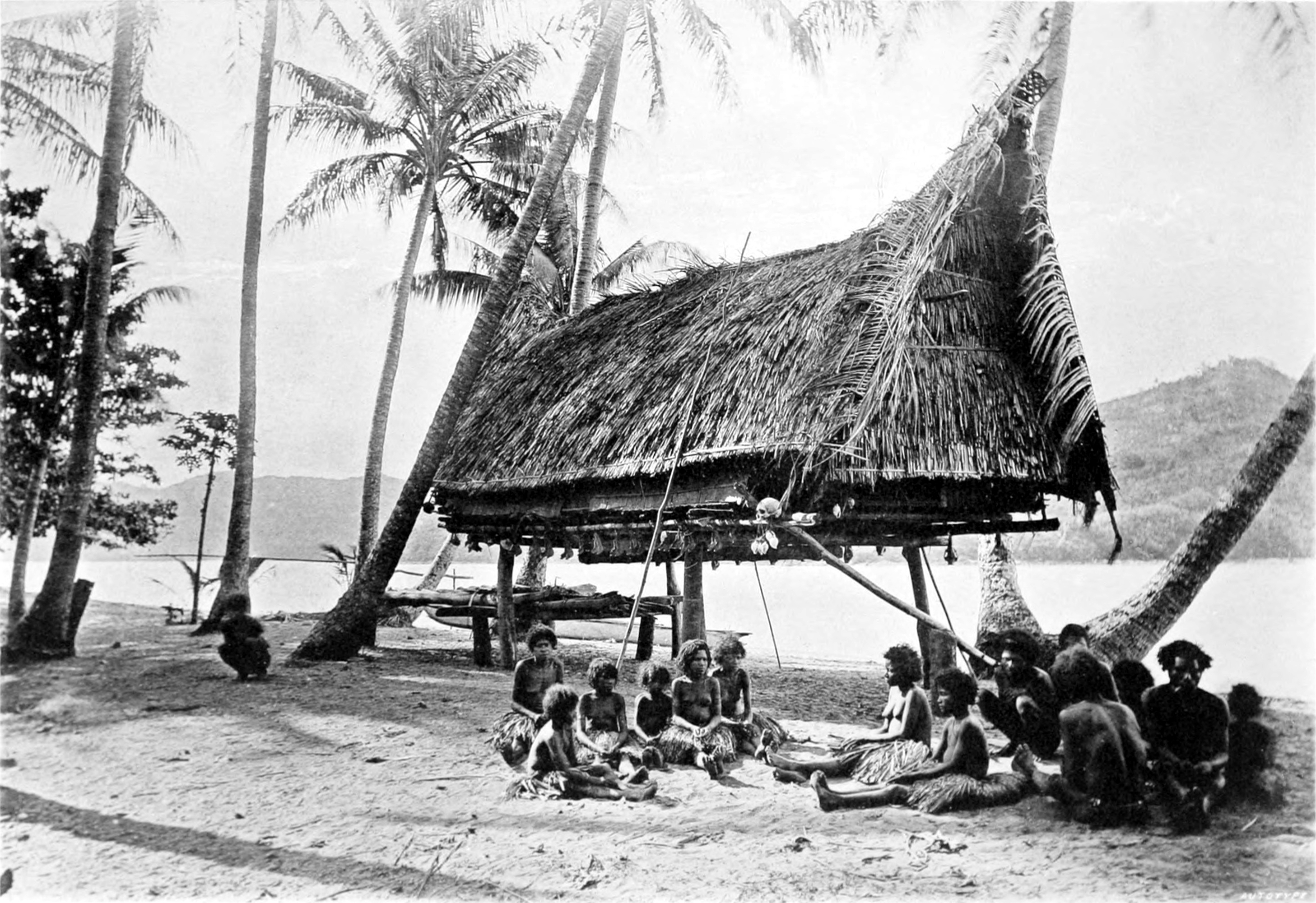
Human skulls in a tribal village; colonial Papua, 1885

Headhunting was practised by many Austronesian people in Southeast Asia and the Pacific Islands. Headhunting has at one time or another been practiced among most of the peoples of Melanesia, including New Guinea. A missionary found 10,000 skulls in a community longhouse on Goaribari Island in 1901.

Historically, the Marind-anim in New Guinea were famed because of their headhunting. The practice was rooted in their belief system and linked to the name-giving of the newborn. The skull was believed to contain a mana-like force. Headhunting was not motivated primarily by cannibalism, but the dead person's flesh was consumed in ceremonies following the capture and killing.

The Korowai, a Papuan tribe in the southeast of Irian Jaya, live in tree houses, some nearly 40 metres (130 ft) high. This was originally believed to be a defensive practice, presumably as protection against the Citak, a tribe of neighbouring headhunters. Some researchers believe that the American Michael Rockefeller, who disappeared in New Guinea in 1961 while on a field trip, may have been taken by headhunters in the Asmat region. He was the son of New York Governor Nelson Rockefeller.

In The Cruise of the Snark (1911), the account by Jack London of his 1905 adventure sailing in Micronesia, he recounted that headhunters of Malaita attacked his ship during a stay in Langa Langa Lagoon, particularly around Laulasi Island. His and other ships were kidnapping villagers as workers on plantations, a practice known as blackbirding. Captain Mackenzie of the ship Minolta was beheaded by villagers as retribution for the loss of village men during an armed labour "recruiting" drive. The villagers believed that the ship's crew "owed" several more heads before the score was even.

=== New Zealand ===
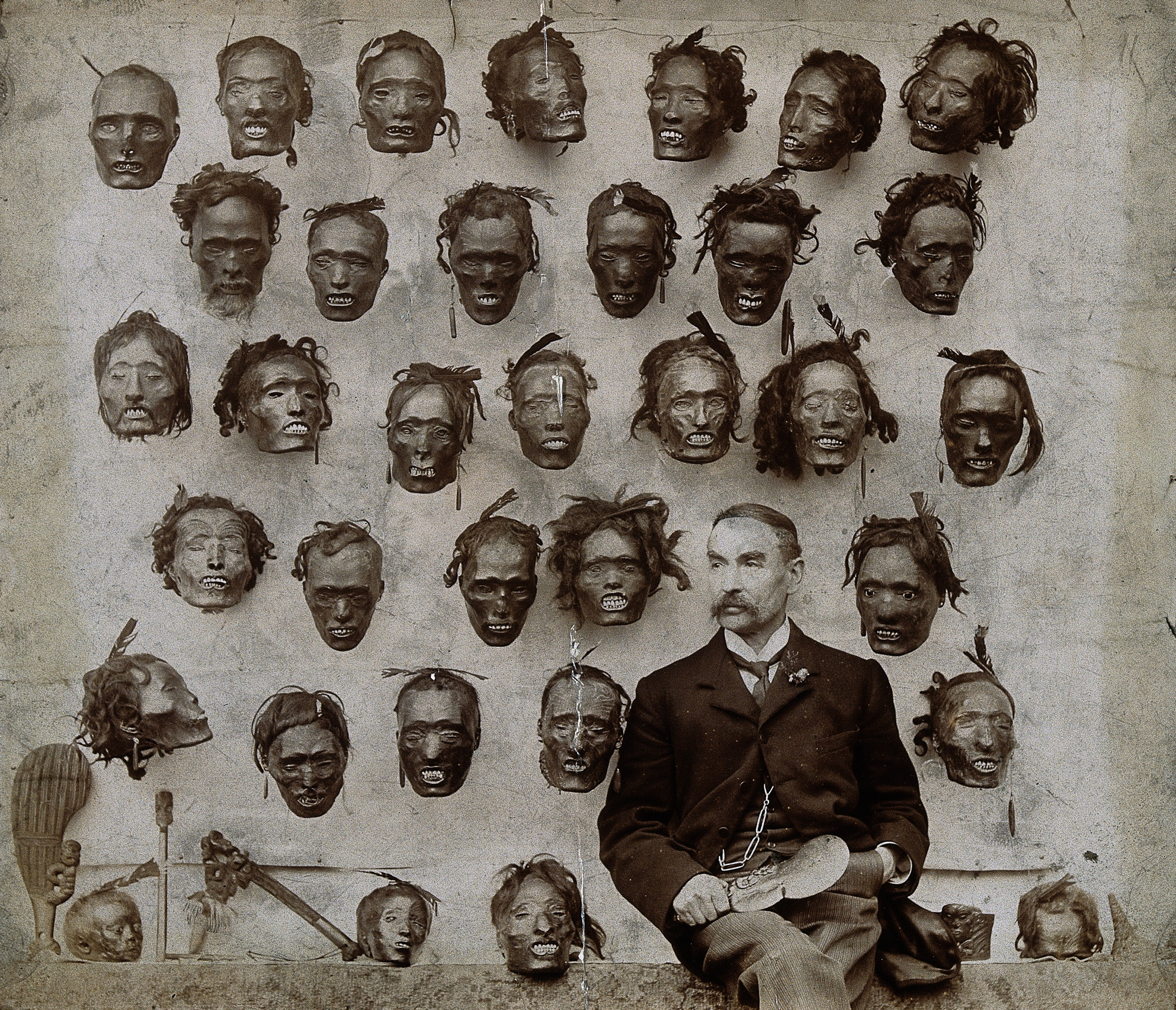
H. G. Robley with his toi moko collection

In New Zealand, the Māori people preserved the heads of some of their ancestors and certain enemies in a form known as toi moko. They removed the brain and eyes, and smoked the head, preserving the tā moko (moko tattoos). The heads were sold to European collectors in the late 1800s, in some instances having been commissioned and "made to order".

=== Philippines ===
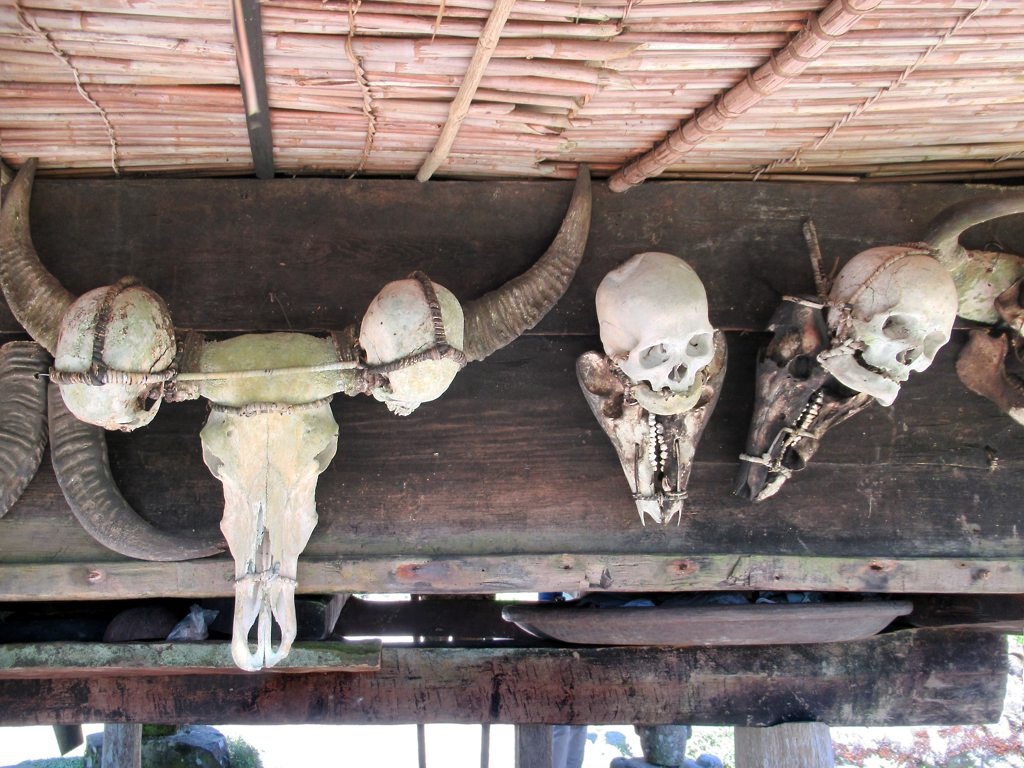
Headhunting skulls collected as trophies during blood feuds in Ifugao. Headhunting was banned in the Philippines in 1913.

In the Philippines, headhunting was extensive among the various Cordilleran peoples (also known as "Igorot") of the Luzon highlands. It was tied with rites of passage, rice harvests, religious rituals to ancestor spirits, blood feuds, and indigenous tattooing. Cordilleran tribes used specific weapons for beheading enemies in raids and warfare, specifically the uniquely shaped head axes and various swords and knives. Though some Cordilleran tribes living near Christianized lowlanders during the Spanish colonial period had already abandoned the practice by the 19th century, they were still rampant in more remote areas beyond the reach of Spanish colonial authorities. The practices were finally suppressed in the early 20th century by the United States during the American colonial period of the Philippines.

=== Taiwan ===
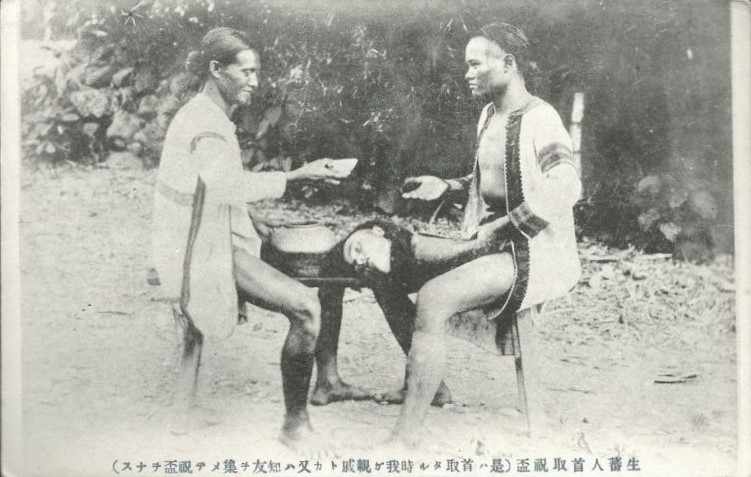
The headhunting ritual of aborigines in Taiwan

Headhunting was a common practice among Taiwanese aborigines. All tribes practiced headhunting except the Yami people, who were previously isolated on Orchid Island, and the Ivatan people. It was associated with the peoples of the Philippines.

Taiwanese Plains Aborigines, Han Taiwanese and Japanese settlers were choice victims of headhunting raids by Taiwanese Mountain Aborigines. The latter two groups were considered invaders, liars, and enemies. A headhunting raid would often strike at workers in the fields, or set a dwelling on fire and then kill and behead those who fled from the burning structure. The practice continued during the Japanese rule of Taiwan, but ended in the 1930s due to brutal suppression by the Japanese colonial government.

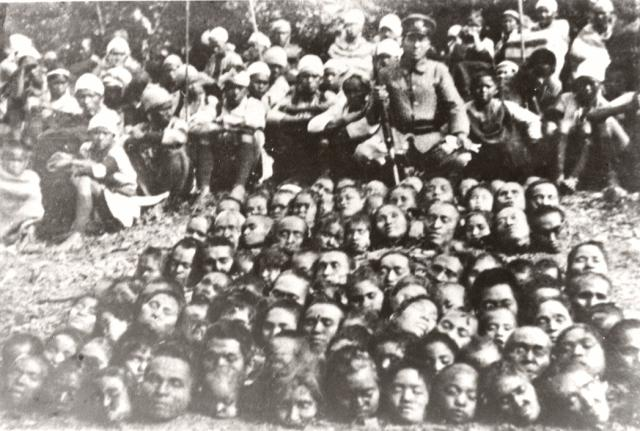
Seediq aboriginal rebels beheaded by pro-Japanese aborigines in the Second Musha Incident

The Taiwanese Aboriginal tribes, who were allied with the Dutch against the Chinese during the Guo Huaiyi Rebellion in 1652, turned against the Dutch in turn during the Siege of Fort Zeelandia. They defected to Koxinga's Chinese forces. The Aboriginals (Formosans) of Sincan defected to Koxinga after he offered them amnesty. The Sincan Aboriginals fought for the Chinese and beheaded Dutch people in executions. The frontier aboriginals in the mountains and plains also surrendered and defected to the Chinese on May 17, 1661, celebrating their freedom from compulsory education under Dutch rule. They hunted down Dutch people, beheading them and trashing their Christian school textbooks.

At the Battle of Tamsui in the Keelung Campaign during the Sino-French War on 8 October 1884, the Chinese took prisoners and beheaded 11 French marines who were injured, in addition to La Galissonnière's captain Fontaine. The heads were mounted on bamboo poles and displayed to incite anti-French feelings. In China, pictures of the beheading of the Frenchmen were published in the Tien-shih-tsai Pictorial Journal in Shanghai.

A most unmistakable scene in the market place occurred. Some six heads of Frenchmen, heads of the true French type were exhibited, much to the disgust of foreigners. A few visited the place where they were stuck up, and were glad to leave it—not only on account of the disgusting and barbarous character of the scene, but because the surrounding crowd showed signs of turbulence. At the camp also were eight other Frenchmen's heads, a sight which might have satisfied a savage or a Hill-man, but hardly consistent with the comparatively enlightened tastes, one would think, of Chinese soldiers even of to-day. It is not known how many of the French were killed and wounded; fourteen left their bodies on shore, and no doubt several wounded were taken back to the ships. (Chinese accounts state that twenty were killed and large numbers wounded.)

In the evening Captain Boteler and Consul Frater called on General Sun, remonstrating with him on the subject of cutting heads off, and allowing them to be exhibited. Consul Frater wrote him a despatch on the subject strongly deprecating such practices, and we understand that the general promised it should not occur again, and orders were at once given to bury the heads. It is difficult for a general even situated as Sun is—having to command troops like the Hillmen, who are the veriest savages in the treatment of their enemies—to prevent such barbarities.

It is said the Chinese buried the dead bodies of the Frenchmen after the engagement on 8th instant by order of General Sun. The Chinese are in possession of a machine gun taken or found on the beach.

— James Wheeler Davidson, The Island of Formosa, Past and Present: History, people, resources, and commercial prospects. Tea, camphor, sugar, gold, coal, sulphur, economical plants, and other productions

Han Taiwanese and Taiwanese Aboriginals revolted against the Japanese in the Beipu Uprising in 1907 and Tapani Incident in 1915. The Seediq aboriginals revolted against the Japanese in the 1930 Musha Incident and resurrected the practice of headhunting, beheading Japanese during the revolt.

== Mainland Asia ==
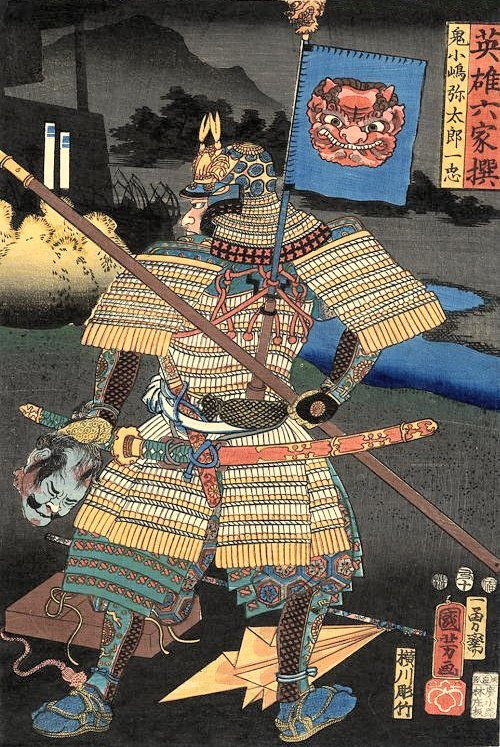
Yataro Kojima (vassal of Kenshin Uesugi) with hunted head

=== China ===
During the Spring and Autumn period and Warring States period, Qin soldiers frequently collected their defeated enemies' heads as a means to accumulate merits. After Shang Yang's reforms, the Qin armies adopted a meritocracy system that awards the average soldiers, most of whom were conscripted serfs and were not paid, an opportunity to earn promotions and rewards from their superiors by collecting the heads of enemies, a type of body count. In this area, authorities also displayed heads of executed criminals in public spaces up to the early 20th century.

The Wa people, a mountain ethnic minority in Southwest China, eastern Myanmar (Shan State) and northern Thailand, were once known as the "Wild Wa" by British colonists due to their traditional practice of headhunting.

=== Japan ===
Tom O'Neill wrote:

Samurai also sought glory by headhunting. When a battle ended, the warrior, true to his mercenary origins, would ceremoniously present trophy heads to a general, who would variously reward him with promotions in rank, gold or silver, or land from the defeated clan. Generals displayed the heads of defeated rivals in public squares.

=== Indian subcontinent and Indochina ===
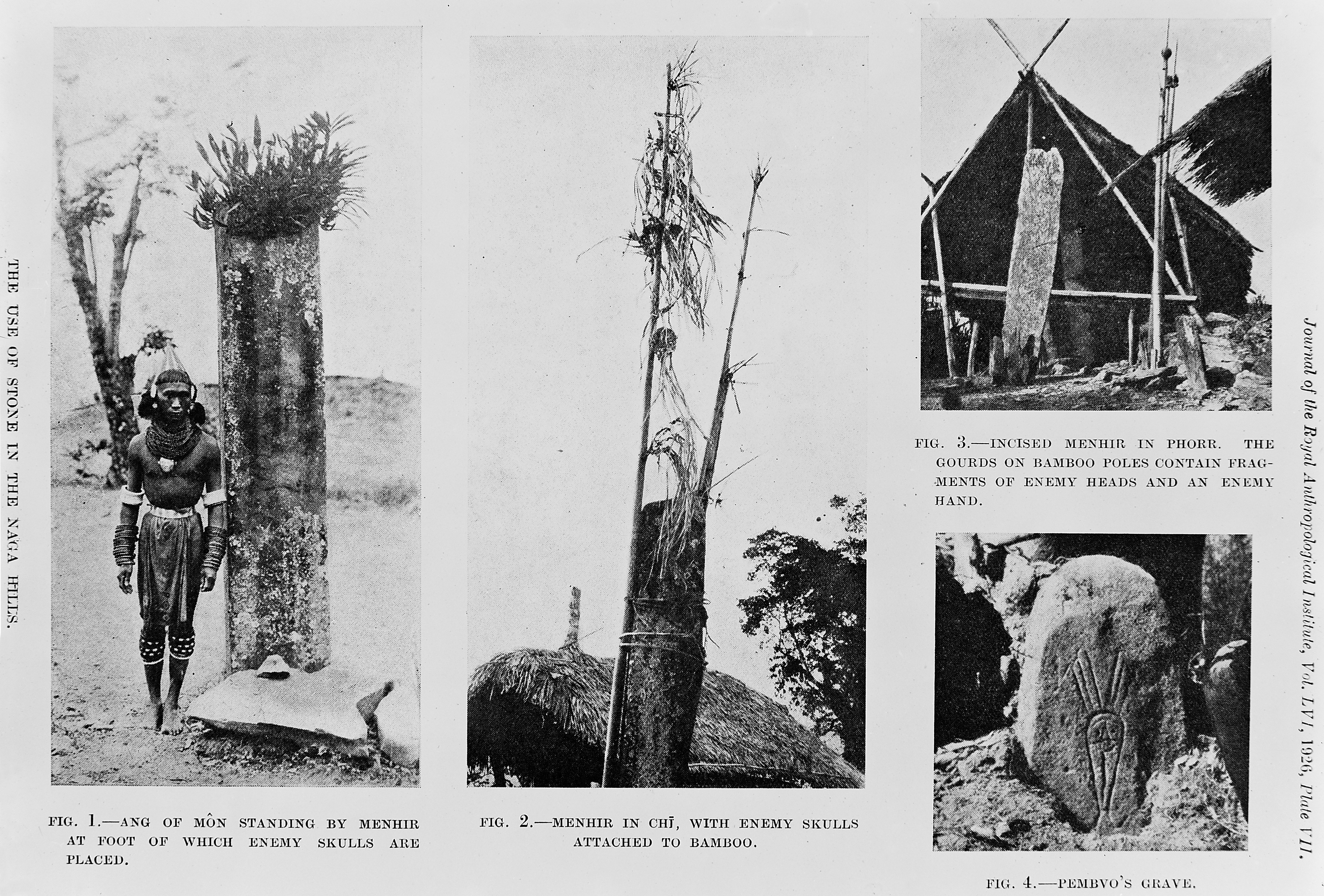
Headhunting among the Naga people

Headhunting has been a practice among the Kukis, Mizo, and Chin (known collectively as the Zo people), the Wa, the Garo and the Naga ethnic groups of India, Bangladesh and Myanmar till the 19th century. Nuristanis in eastern Afghanistan were headhunters until the late 19th century.

==== Mizo people ====
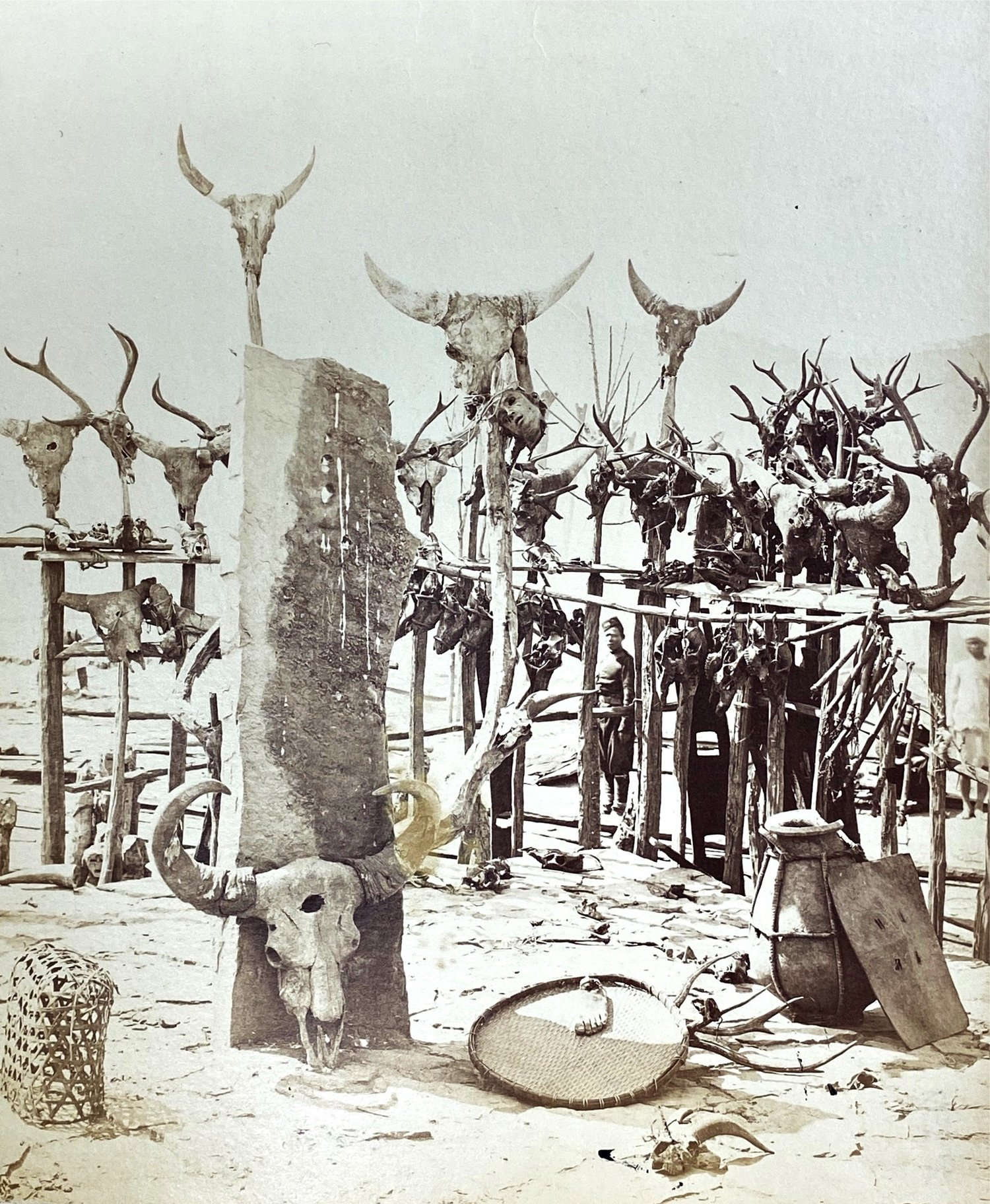
Photograph by Colonel H.G Woodthorpe of Chief Vanhnuailiana's tomb with a head observed during the Lushai Expedition.

Mizo warfare would often rely on secret attacks and ambushing in surprise of their enemies. This led to superstitions as to the time and auspiciousness to conduct a raid. A headhunting expedition would concern stargazing where the crescent of the moon would be studied as an omen. If a star accompanied the new moon on its right side, this was considered "the moon is brandishing a knife" hence not permitting a raid to occur. If the star appeared left of the crescent moon then this would be perceived as "the moon is carrying a head" which was auspicious for a raid. Another superstition concerned the minivet. If on a journey to raid, the minivet flew away from the village it was a sign of success. If it flew to the village while screeching then the omen would lead the party to turn back.

A portion of men would be assigned to a raid and a portion to remain home to defend the village. After killing one's enemies, the victor was required to place his foot on the corpse, shout the victim's name three times, and sing a Bawhhla (battle song). This was due to the belief that doing so would enable the killed warrior to become the victor's slave in the afterlife. By proclaiming his name and singing a song, the slave would recognize his master's voice. Following this, the victims would be decapitated. If the journey home was too far, then the scalps of the heads would be taken instead as proof of their victory.

Returning to the village, it was a taboo to bring the heads in during daylight. The war party would remain outside the village and delay their entrance. Only after dinner and the courtship hours between young men and women in the evening would the party be permitted to enter. The party arriving with the heads would announce themselves with gunshots and a bawhhla of their victory. Village maidens would then take initiative throughout the night to make an Arkeziak to tie on the heads, necks, wrists, ankles or upper arms of the warriors. The Arkeziak was made with a white spun cotton not boiled with rice and plaited into a pattern with tassels. The rest of the village would not meet the party out of taboo while the return was being celebrated with battle songs and gunshots.

The following morning, the women tied the Arkeziak made during the night. The village chief and upas would honour the warriors with necklaces of amber and semi-precious stones. Even if a warrior had failed to bring back a head or scalp, any assistance in procuring the heads of the corpses would see them on equal footing with the rest of the warriors, however, with less rewards. The heads would be accompanied with other spoils of war such as guns, gongs, spears and knives distributed to the families of the warriors via small payments. It was forbidden to ask for trophies or receive them as a gift.

The heads of the warriors would be stored in the Thirdengsa (blacksmiths forge). After breakfast, a ceremony would be held. The heads would be retrieved from the forge and each warrior would carry the head they procured from slaying and assemble in front of the chief's house in the village square. A small table would be made for the heads to be placed. A broken piece of pottery would be placed with stale rice in it. A ritual dance would be performed for the ceremony. Young women would also join the ritual dance.

The warriors would surround the table to perform another custom. The party leader would have a boiled egg in his bag. Half of the egg would be consumed with the other half squeezed and sprinkled into the stale rice in the broken pot. A spell would be chanted to curse the heads on the table. A battle song would be sung and the gun would be fired three times. Music and song would then play following this. The warriors would also during this period taunt, gloat and scoff at the heads. Guns would be loaded with gunpowder but no bullets as they were fired at the heads. Following this, a pot of zu would be placed in the village square. A mithun would be killed and offered to the warriors. A feast would be held with the customs of serving zu.

After the complete ceremony, the heads would be taken and fixed on the ends of freshly cut poles. The poles would be placed on the west side of the village and erected in a row in the lungdawh (cemetery). Some heads would be suspended to the entrance to the village. Any tree hanging the heads of enemies would be known as Sah-lam. A headhunter was also expected to sacrifice a mithun or a pig under a superstition that doing so would not engage the spirit of the head to turn the headhunter insane.

==== Wa people ====
The Wa people, whose domain straddles the Burma-China border, were once known to Europeans as the "Wild Wa" for their "savage" behavior. Until the 1970s, the Wa practiced headhunting.

== Americas ==
=== Amazon ===
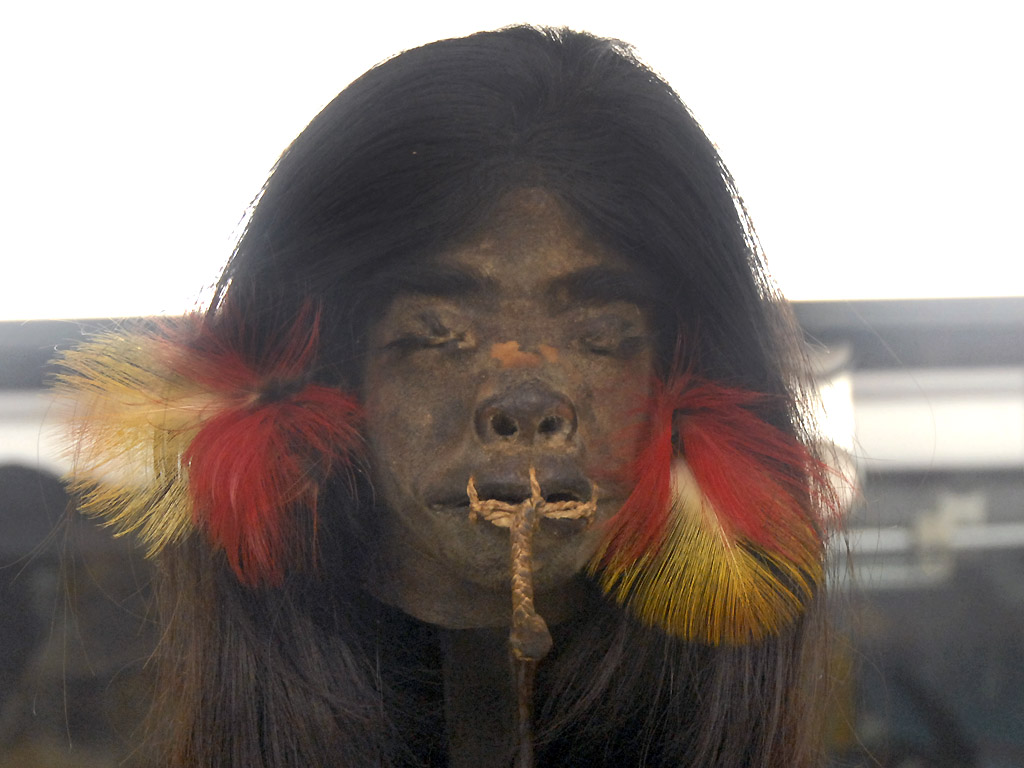
Shrunken head from the upper Amazon region

Several tribes of the Jivaroan group, including the Shuar in Eastern Ecuador and Northern Peru, along the rivers Chinchipe, Bobonaza, Morona, Upano, and Pastaza, main tributaries of the Amazon, practiced headhunting for trophies. The heads were shrunk, and were known locally as Tzan-Tzas. The people believed that the head housed the soul of the person killed.

In the 21st century, the Shuar produce Tzan-tza replicas. They use their traditional process on heads of monkeys and sloths, selling the items to tourists. It is believed that splinter groups in the local tribes continue with these practices when there is a tribal feud over territory or as revenge for a crime of passion.

The Kichwa-Lamista people in Peru used to be headhunters.

=== Mesoamerican civilizations ===
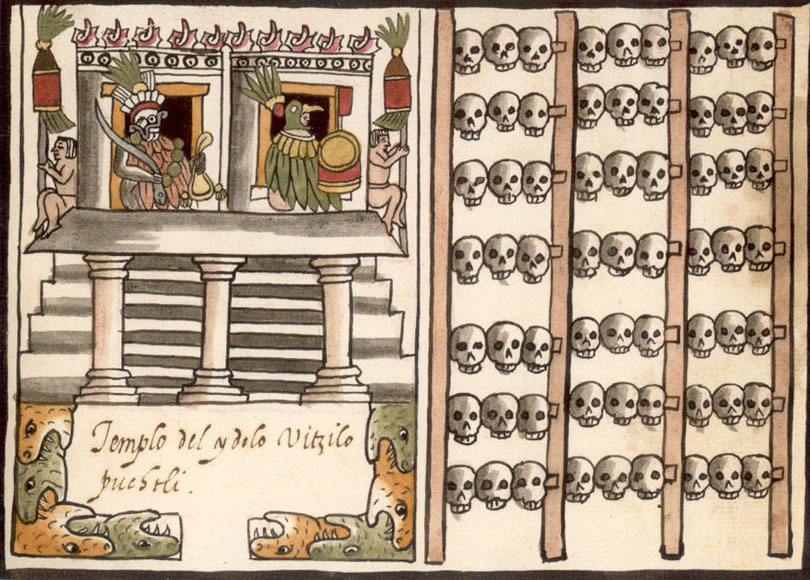
A tzompantli is illustrated to the right of a depiction of an Aztec temple dedicated to the deity Huitzilopochtli; from Juan de Tovar's 1587 manuscript, also known as the Ramírez Codex.

A tzompantli is a type of wooden rack or palisade documented in several Mesoamerican civilizations. It was used for the public display of human skulls, typically those of war captives or other sacrificial victims.

A tzompantli-type structure has been excavated at the La Coyotera, Oaxaca site. It is dated to the Proto-Classic Zapotec civilization, which flourished from c. 2nd century BCE to the 3rd century CE. Tzompantli are also noted in other Mesoamerican pre-Columbian cultures, such as the Toltec and Mixtec.

Based on numbers given by the conquistador Andrés de Tapia and Fray Diego Durán, Bernard Ortiz de Montellano has calculated in the late 20th century that there were at most 60,000 skulls on the Hueyi Tzompantli (great Skullrack) of Tenochtitlan. There were at least five more skullracks in Tenochtitlan, but, by all accounts, they were much smaller.

Other examples are indicated from Maya civilization sites. A particularly fine and intact inscription example survives at the extensive Chichen Itza site.

=== Nazca culture ===
The Nazca used severed heads, known as trophy heads, in various religious rituals. Late Nazca iconography suggests that the prestige of the leaders of Late Nazca society was enhanced by successful headhunting.

== Europe ==
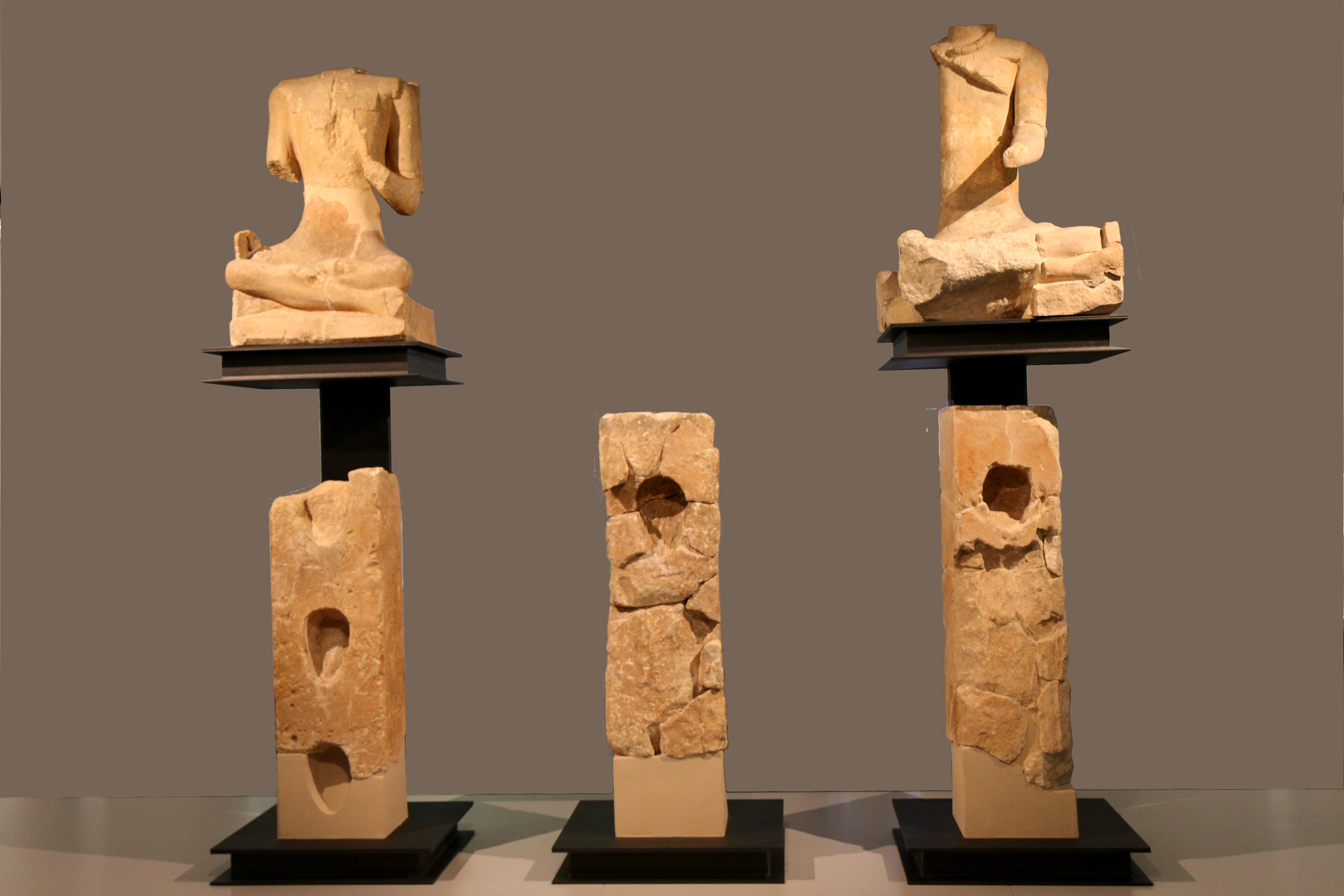
Roquepertuse. The pillars of the portico, with cavities designed for receiving skulls. III-II B.C. Musée d'archéologie méditerranéenne in Marseille.

=== Celts ===
The Celts of Europe practiced headhunting as the head was believed to house a person's soul. Ancient Romans and Greeks recorded the Celts' habits of nailing heads of personal enemies to walls or dangling them from the necks of horses. The Celtic Gaels practiced headhunting a great deal longer. In the Ulster Cycle of Irish mythology, the demigod Cúchulainn beheads the three sons of Nechtan and mounts their heads on his chariot. This is believed to have been a traditional warrior, rather than religious, practice. The practice continued approximately to the end of the Middle Ages among the Irish clans and even later among the Border Reivers of the Anglo-Scottish marches. The pagan religious reasons for headhunting were likely lost after the Celts' conversion to Christianity, even though the practice continued. In former Celtic areas, cephalophore representations of saints (miraculously carrying their severed heads) were common. Heads were also taken among the Germanic tribes and among Iberians, but the purpose is unknown.

=== Montenegrins ===
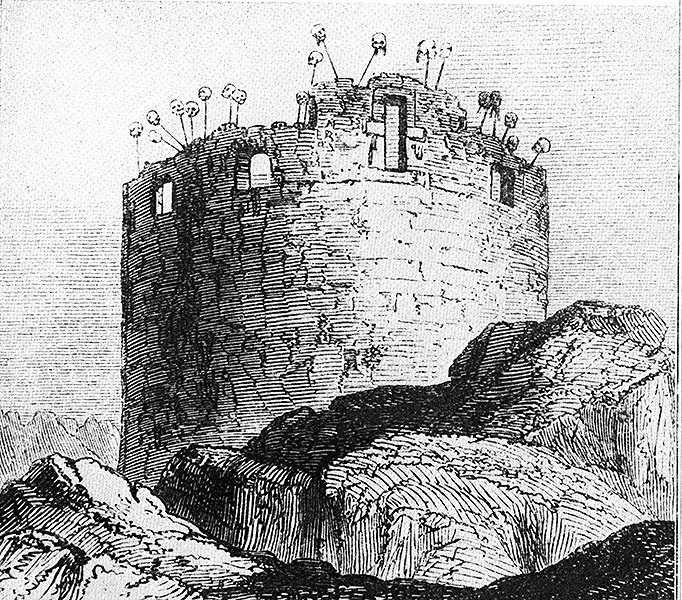
A painting of the Tablja Tower adorned with Ottoman soldier heads, which was located above the Cetinje Monastery in the old royal capital of Cetinje.

The Montenegrins are an ethnic group in Southeastern Europe who are centered around the Dinaric mountains and are extremely closely related to Serbs. They practiced headhunting until 1876, allegedly carrying the head from a lock of hair grown specifically for that purpose. In the 1830s, Montenegrin ruler Petar II Petrović-Njegoš started building a tower called "Tablja" above Cetinje Monastery. The tower was never finished, and Montenegrins used it to display Turkish heads taken in battle, as they were in frequent conflict with the Ottoman Empire. In 1876 King Nicholas I of Montenegro ordered that the practice should end. He knew that European diplomats considered it to be barbaric. The Tablja was demolished in 1937.

=== Scythians ===
The Scythians were excellent horsemen. Ancient Greek historian Herodotus wrote that some of their tribes practiced human sacrifice, drinking the blood of victims, scalping their enemies, and drinking wine from the enemies' skulls.

== Modern times ==
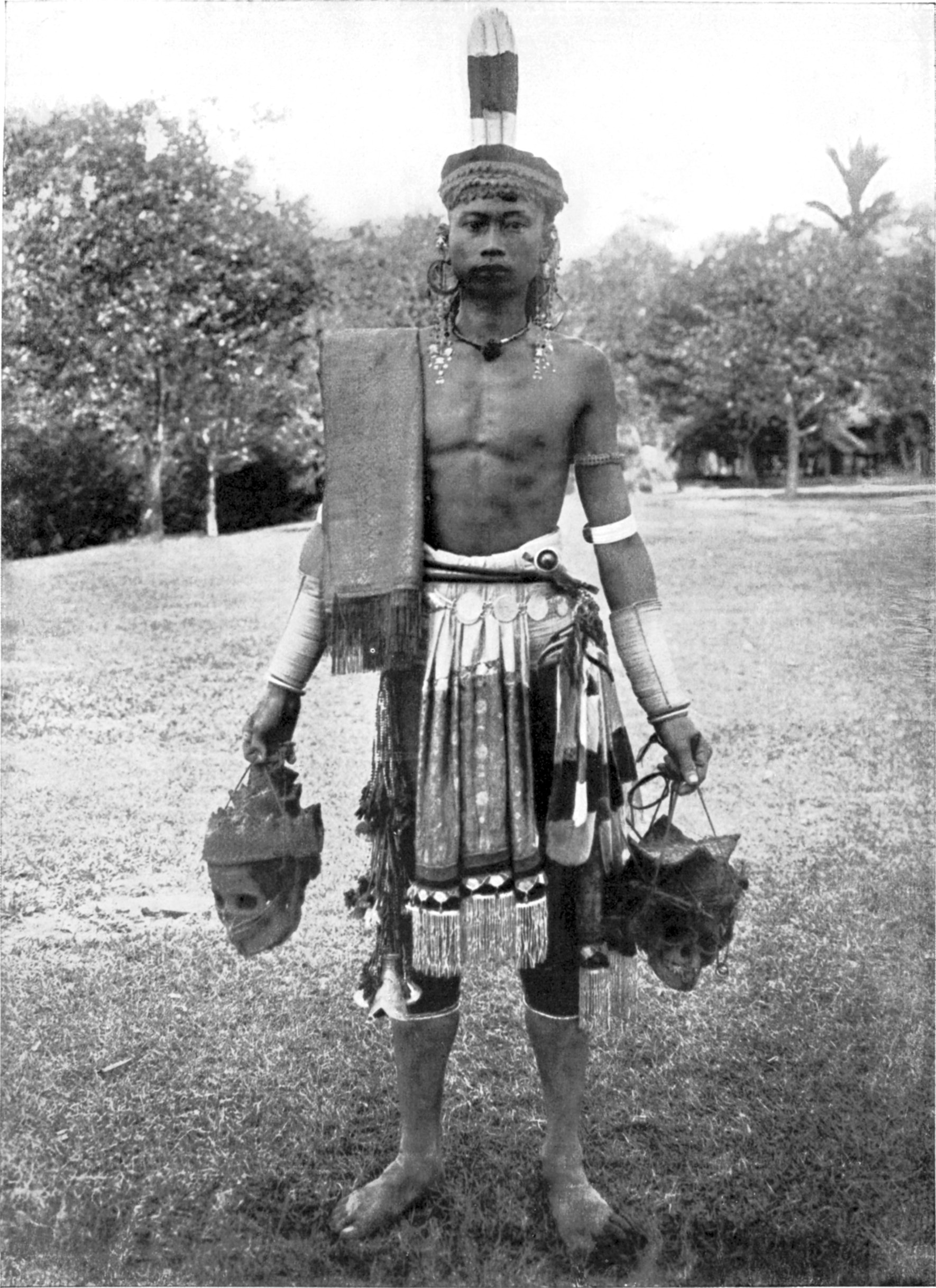
A Dayak headhunter, Borneo

=== Second Sino-Japanese War ===
==== Nanjing Massacre ====
Many Chinese soldiers and civilians were beheaded by some Japanese soldiers, who even made contests to see who would kill more people (see Hundred man killing contest), and took photos with the piles of heads as souvenirs.

=== World War II ===
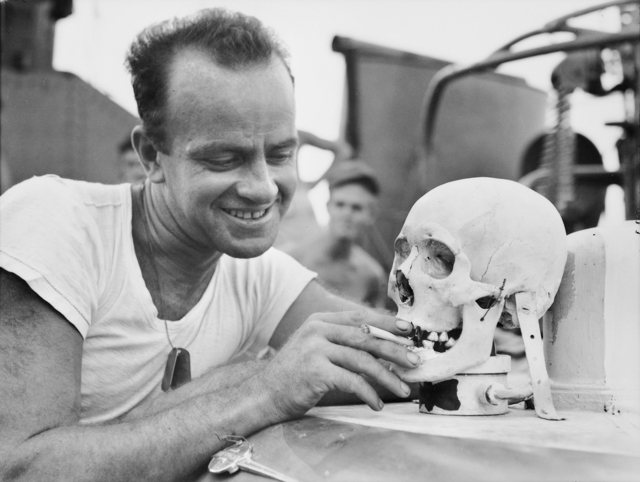
An American posing with a Japanese skull in World War II

During World War II, Allied (specifically including American) troops occasionally collected the skulls of dead Japanese as personal trophies, as souvenirs for friends and family at home, and for sale to others. (The practice was unique to the Pacific theater; United States forces did not take skulls of German and Italian soldiers.) In September 1942, the Commander in Chief of the Pacific Fleet mandated strong disciplinary action against any soldier who took enemy body parts as souvenirs. But such trophy-hunting persisted: Life published a photograph in its issue of May 22, 1944, of a young woman posing with the autographed skull sent to her by her Navy boyfriend. There was public outrage in the US in response.

Historians have suggested that the practice related to Americans viewing the Japanese as lesser people, and in response to mutilation and torture of American war dead. In Borneo, retaliation by natives against the Japanese was based on atrocities having been committed by the Imperial Japanese Army in that area. Following their ill treatment by the Japanese, the Dayak of Borneo formed a force to help the Allies. Australian and British special operatives of Z Special Unit developed some of the inland Dayak tribesmen into a thousand-strong headhunting army. This army of tribesmen killed or captured some 1,500 Japanese soldiers.

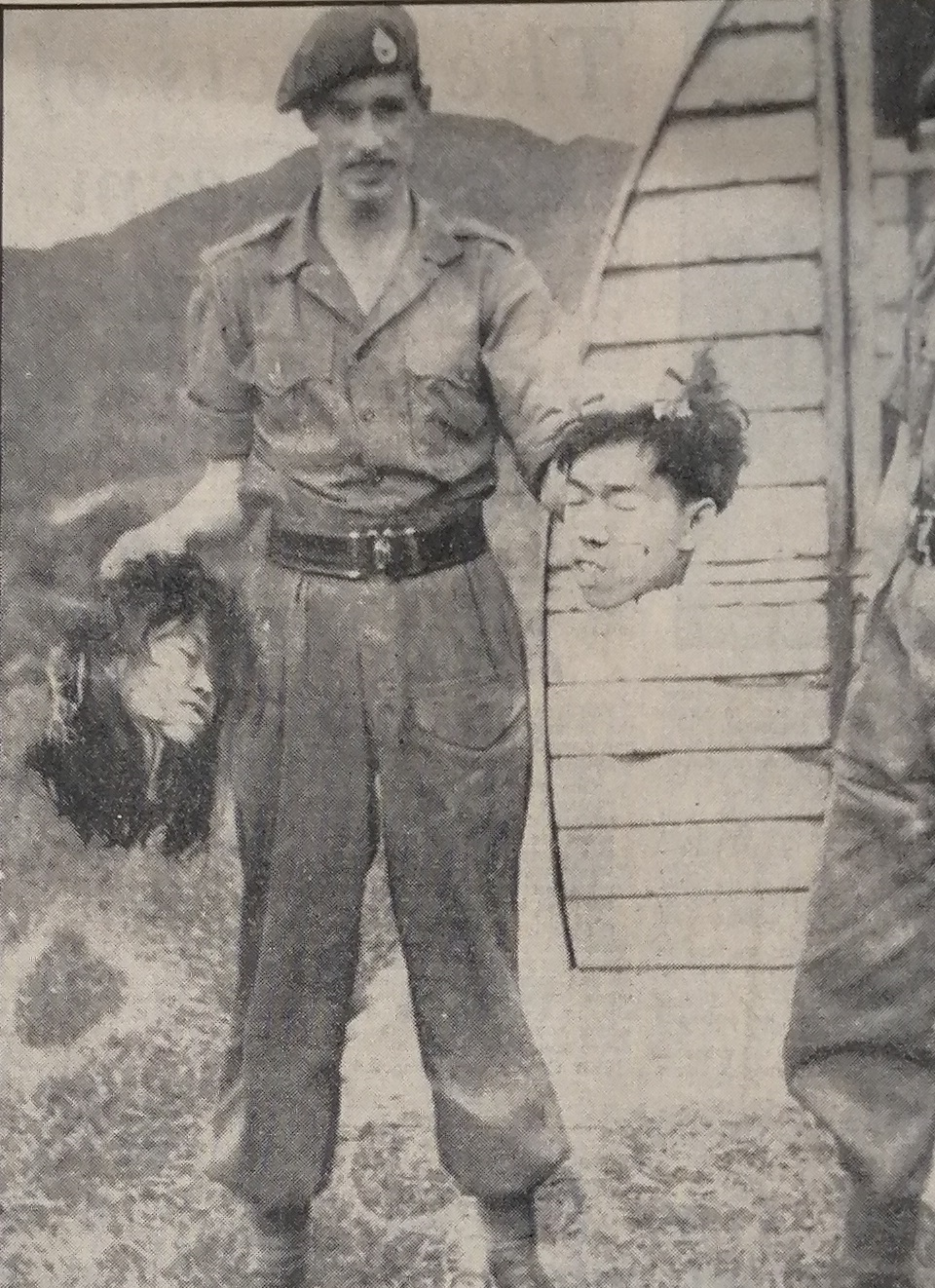
A Royal Marine holding the severed heads of suspected pro-independence fighters during the Malayan Emergency (1948–1960)

=== Malayan Emergency ===
During the Malayan Emergency (1948–1960), British and Commonwealth forces recruited Iban (Dayak) headhunters from Borneo to fight and decapitate suspected guerrillas of the socialist and pro-independence Malayan National Liberation Army, officially claiming this was done for "identification" purposes. Iban headhunters were permitted to keep the scalps of corpses as trophies. Privately, the Colonial Office noted that "there is no doubt that under international law a similar case in wartime would be a war crime". Skull fragments from a trophy skull was later found to have been displayed in a British regimental museum.

In April 1952, the British Communist Party's official newspaper the Daily Worker (today known as the Morning Star) published a photograph of Royal Marines in a British military base in Malaya openly posing with severed human heads. Initially, British government spokespersons belonging to the Admiralty and the Colonial Office denied the newspaper's claims and insisted that the photograph was a forgery. In response, the Daily Worker released yet another photograph taken in Malaya showing other British soldiers posing with a severed human head. In response, Colonial Secretary Oliver Lyttelton was forced to admit before the House of Commons that the Daily Worker headhunting photographs were indeed genuine. In response to the Daily Worker articles, headhunting was banned by Winston Churchill, who feared that further photographs would continue being exploited for communist propaganda.

Despite the shocking imagery of the photographs of soldiers posing with severed heads in Malaya, the Daily Worker was the only British newspaper to publish them during the 20th century, and the photographs were virtually ignored by the mainstream British press.

== Interpretations of headhunting ==
Headhunting attracts attention to cultures uninvolved in the ritualism of its practice. Early Western observers often considered it taboo, claiming the behavior to be evident of savage intent. Due to the tradition’s misunderstanding across most colonial Euro-American cultures, it fueled discrimination. Headhunting was easily attributed to an interpreted primitive life in the cultures that engaged in the behaviors. The belief that cultures performing headhunting rituals late into human history were savage led to forcible attempts of religious conversation made by Western colonizers. Ecocentric perspective created a divide between parties involved in these rituals and those witnessing from outside.

== Cultural Impact ==
=== Art ===
Headhunting appears frequently in many forms of tribal art. Trophy heads have been depicted in numerous cultures’ artwork, including sculptures, carvings, tattoos, and ceremonial masks. Each culture depicts their headhunting rituals distinctly through different art forms. In all art forms, the works depict powerful symbolic and cultural significance, varying in stylistic design. Mediums vary from wood to skin to textile. Fashion and dance are even recorded to depict representations of pride, sometimes even involving the severed heads, themselves. Mask usage in these ritualistic dances often depicted social status, power, and pride in affiliation with headhunting.

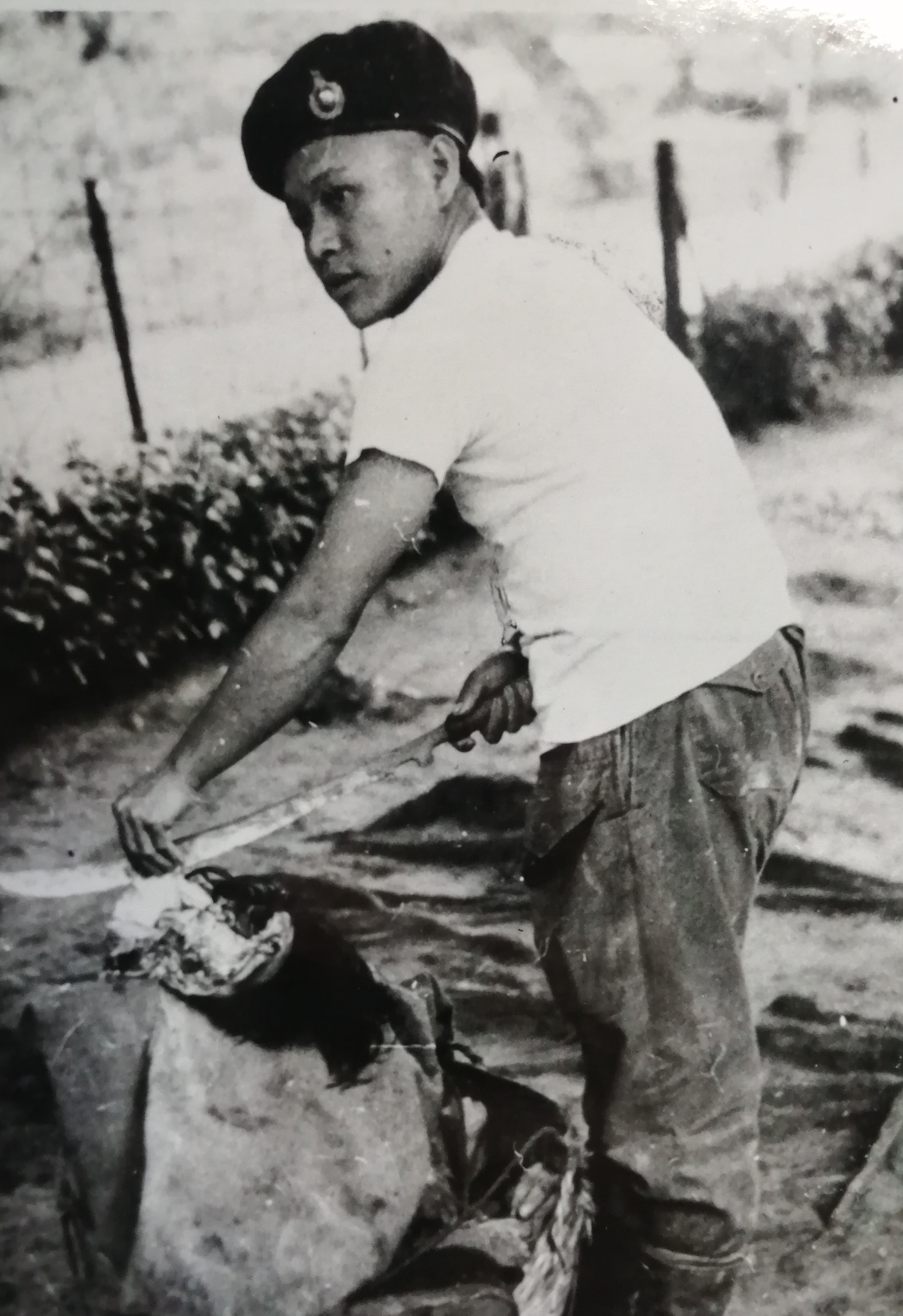
An Iban headhunter wearing a Royal Marine beret prepares a human scalp above a basket of human body parts.

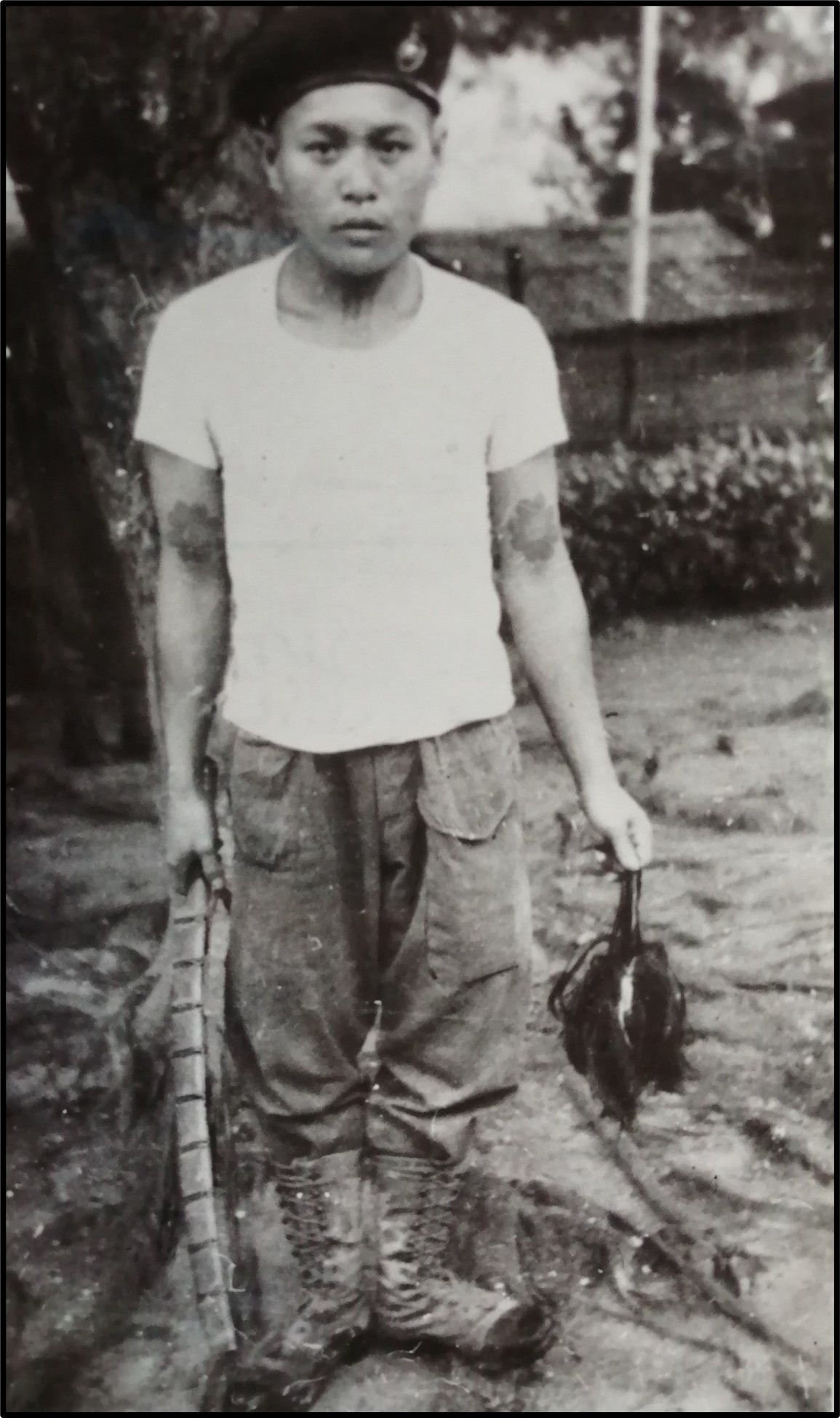
An Iban headhunter posing with a human scalp

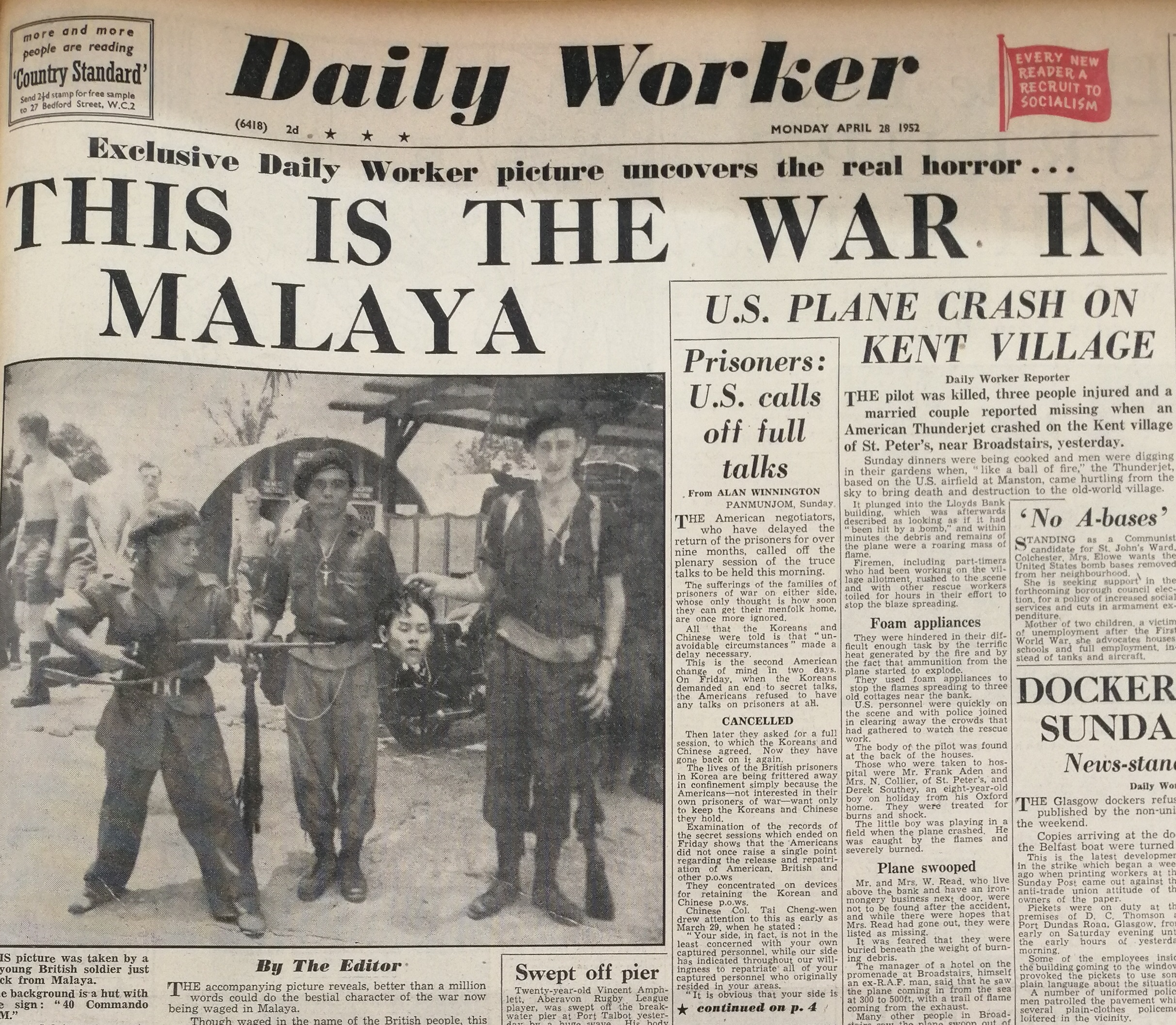
The Daily Worker exposes the practice of headhunting among British troops in Malaya. 28 April 1952.

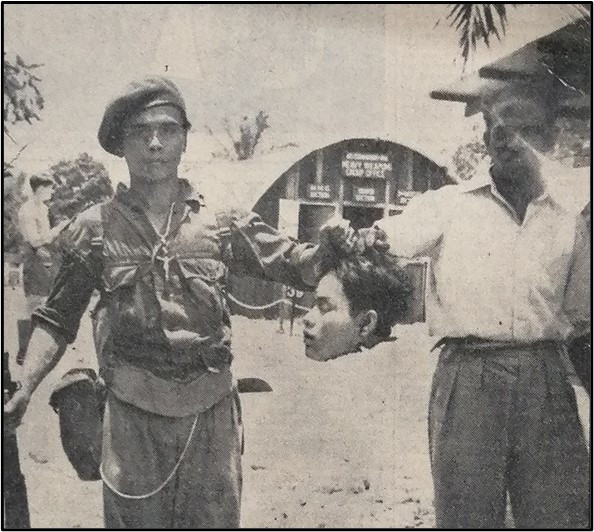
Commonwealth soldiers pose with a severed head inside a British military base in Malaya during the Malayan Emergency

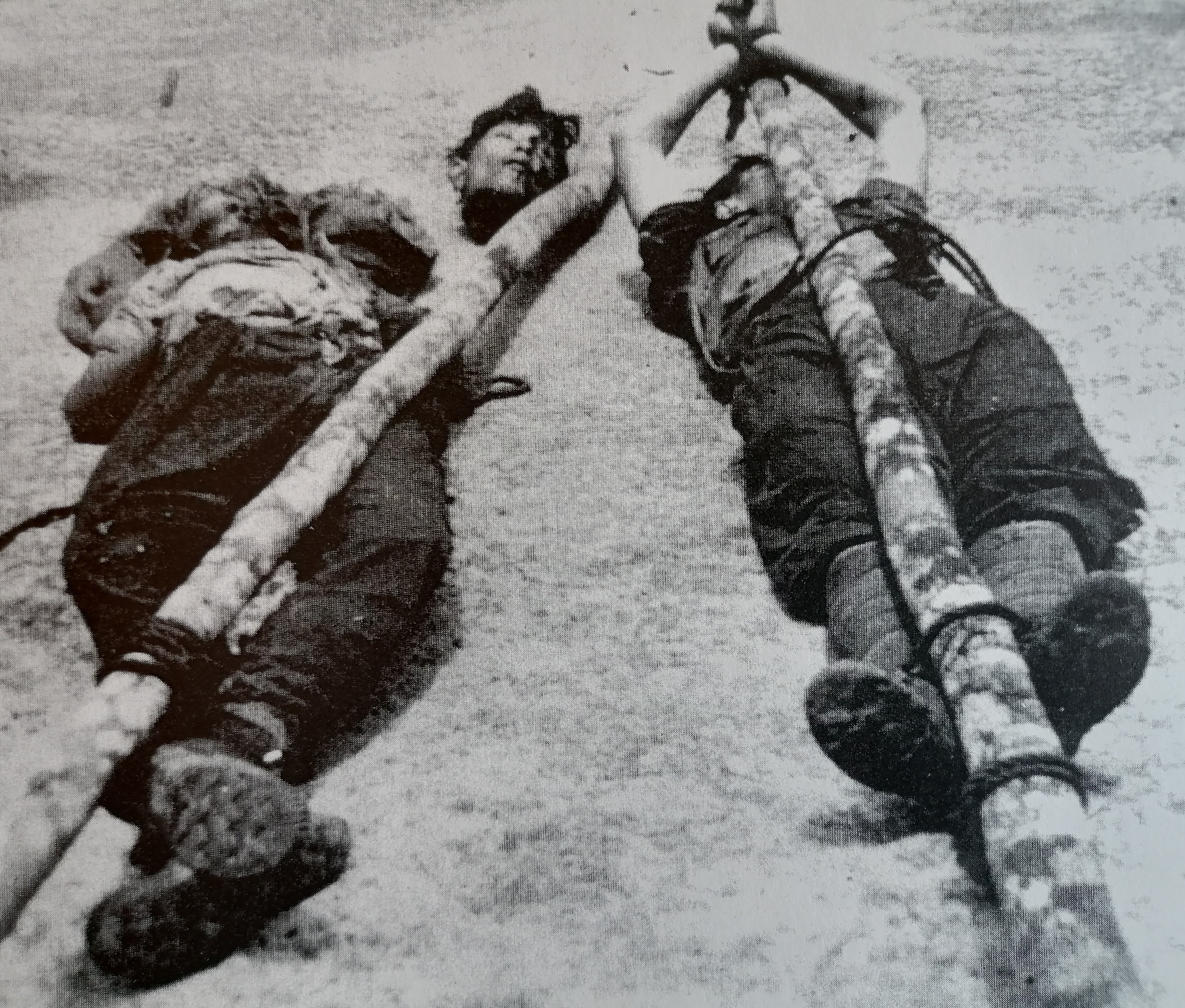
Two corpses and a severed head belonging to guerrillas killed by the Queen's Own Royal West Kent Regiment.

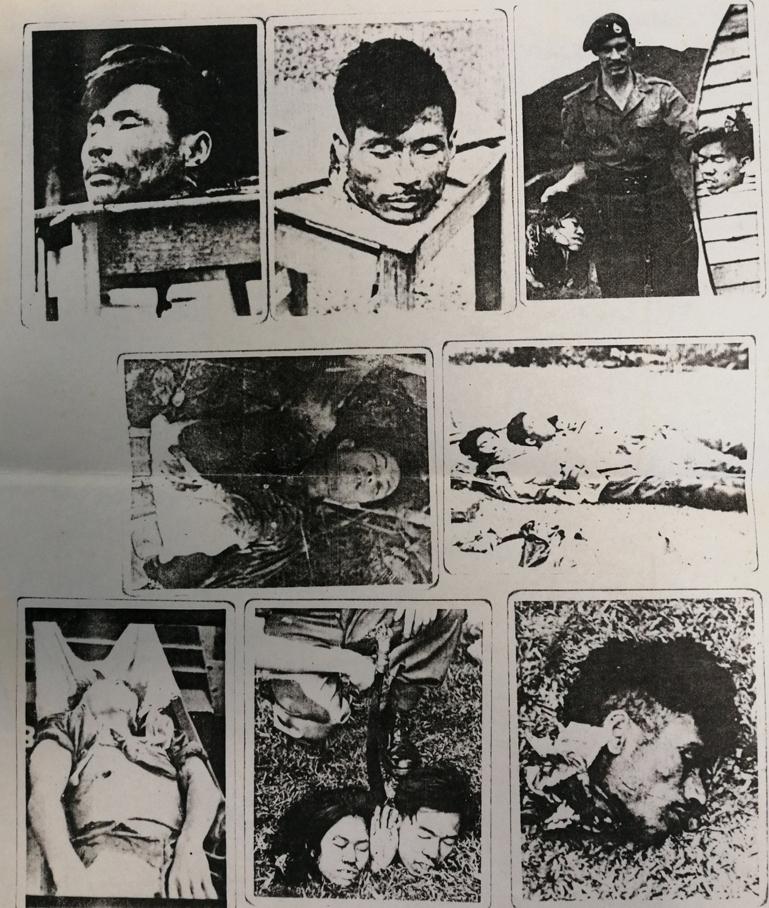
Atrocity photographs (including headhunting) from the archives of the Working Class Movement Library, Manchester.

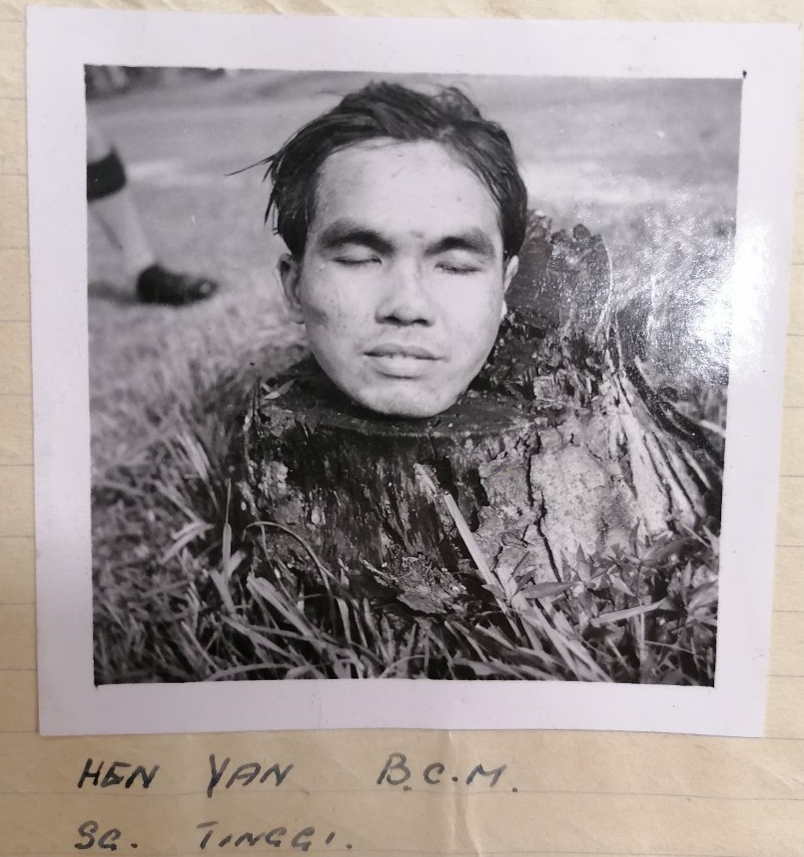
Severed head of MNLA guerrilla commander Hen Yan, killed in 1952 by the Suffolk Regiment.

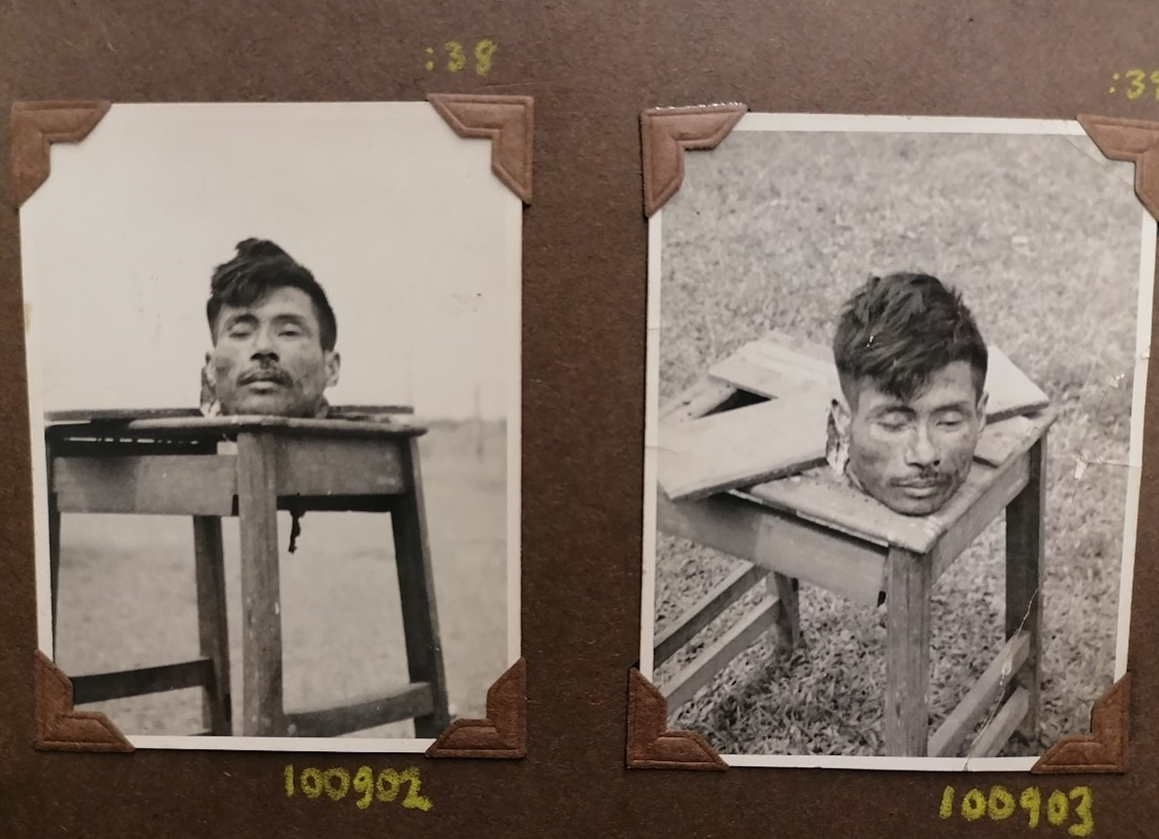
Photographs of decapitated MNLA member held in the archives of the National Army Museum, London.

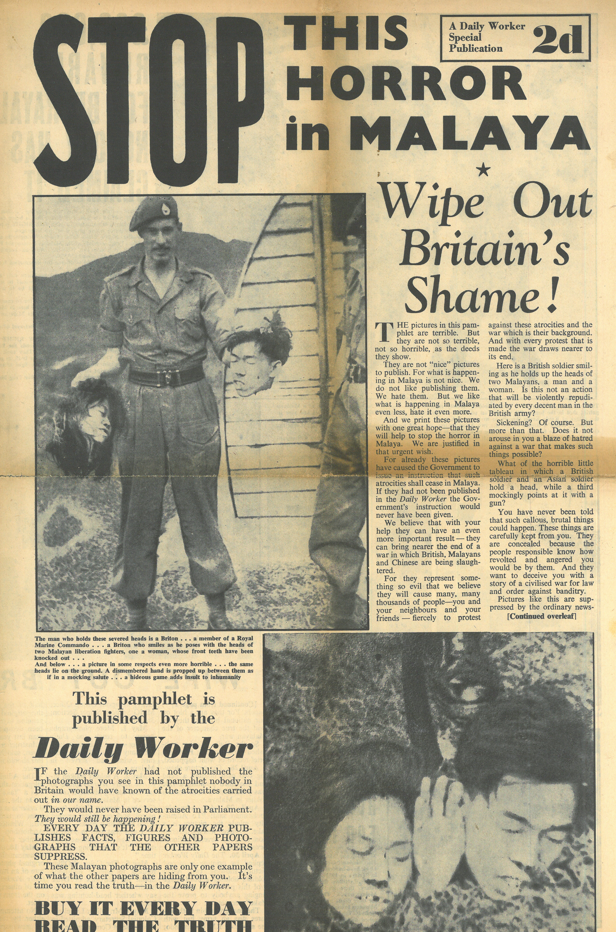
Anti-war leaflet published in 1952 protesting British headhunting in Malaya

=== Vietnam War ===
During the Vietnam War, some American soldiers engaged in the practice of taking "trophy skulls".

== Gallery ==
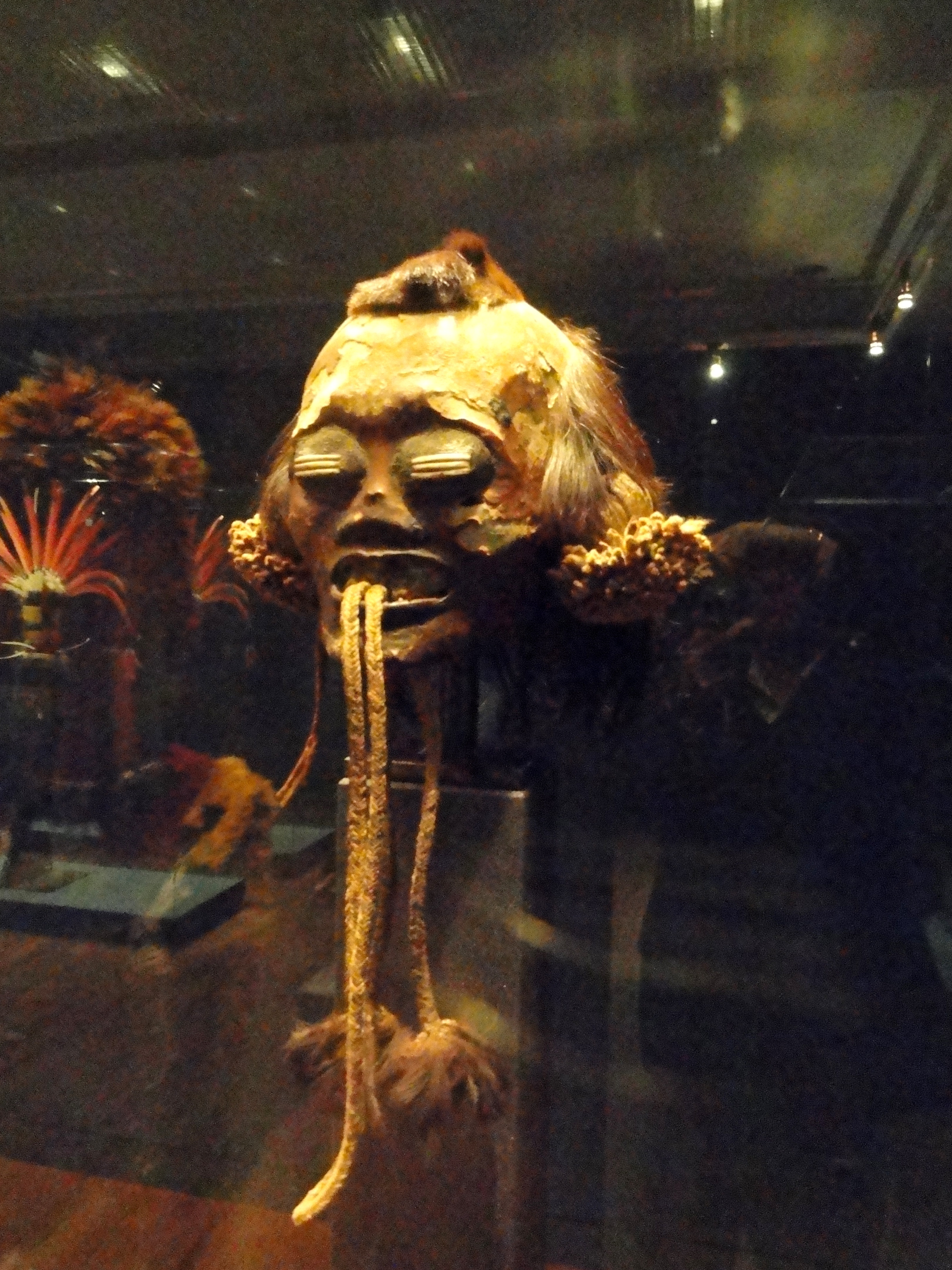
Head trophy, Munduruku people, northern Brazil, c. 1820

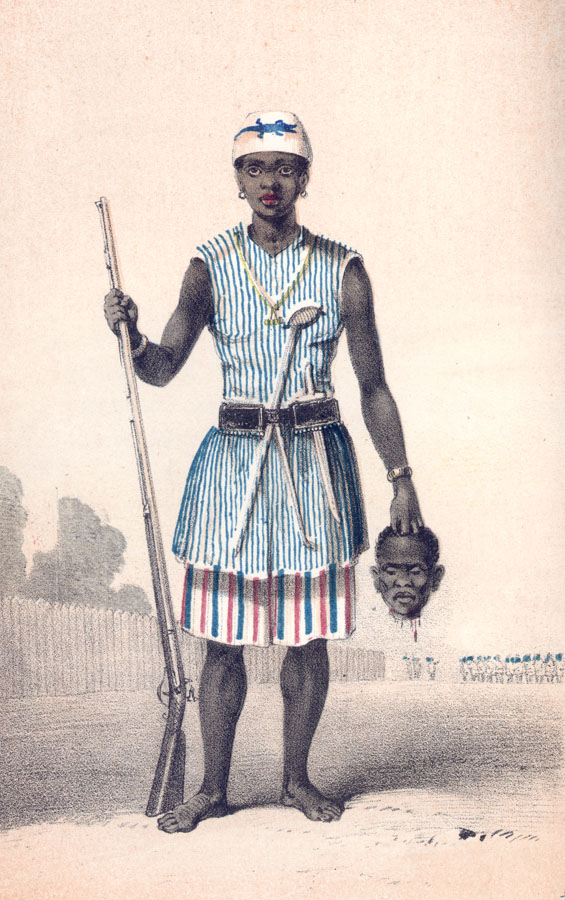
Seh-Dong-Hong-Beh, leader of the Dahomey Amazons, holding a severed head

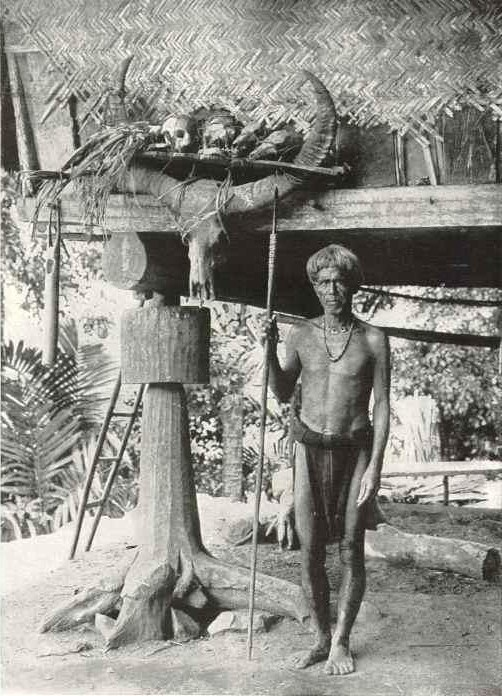
An Ifugao warrior with some of his trophies, Philippines, 1912

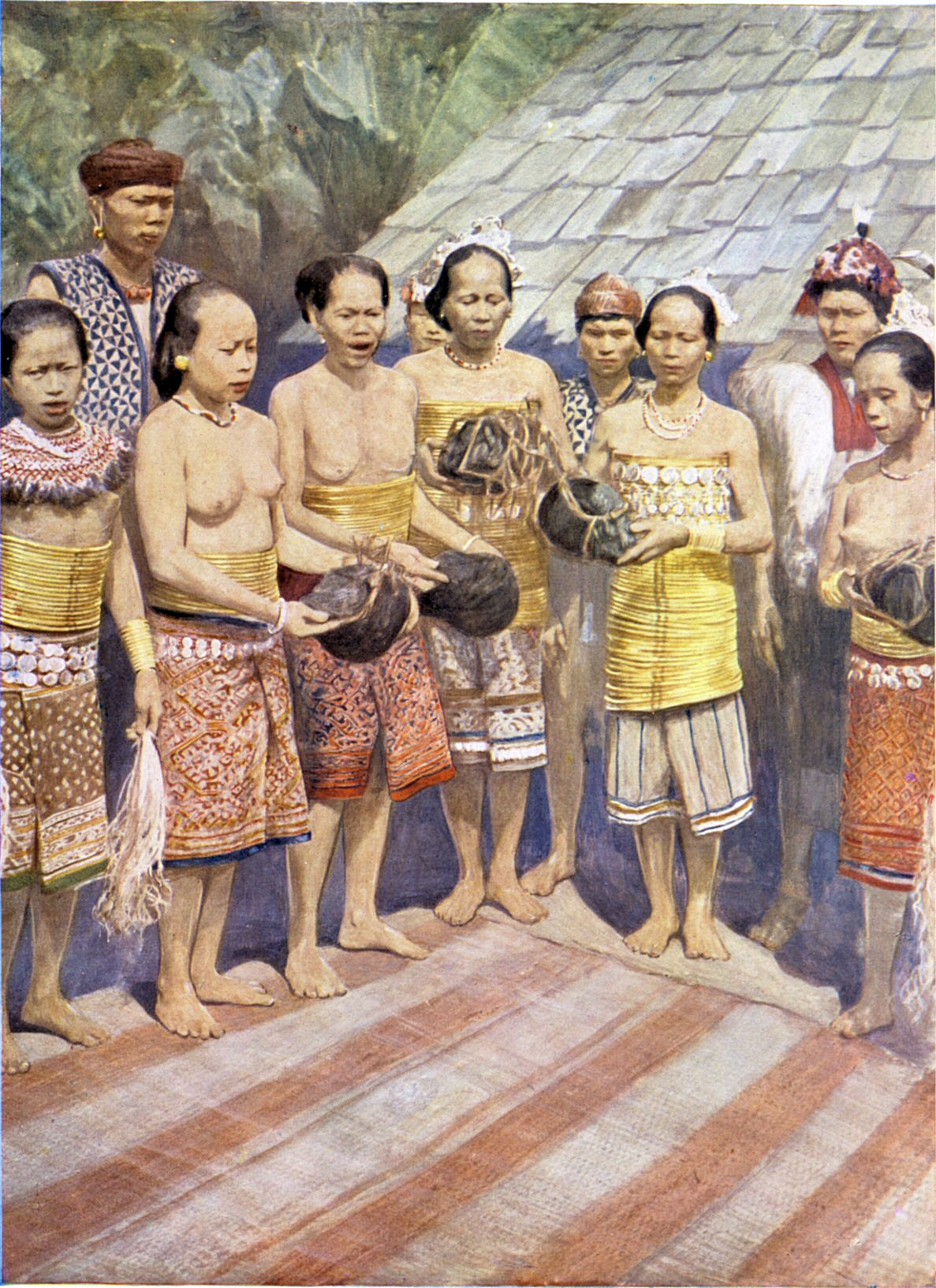
Dayak women dancing with human heads, 1912

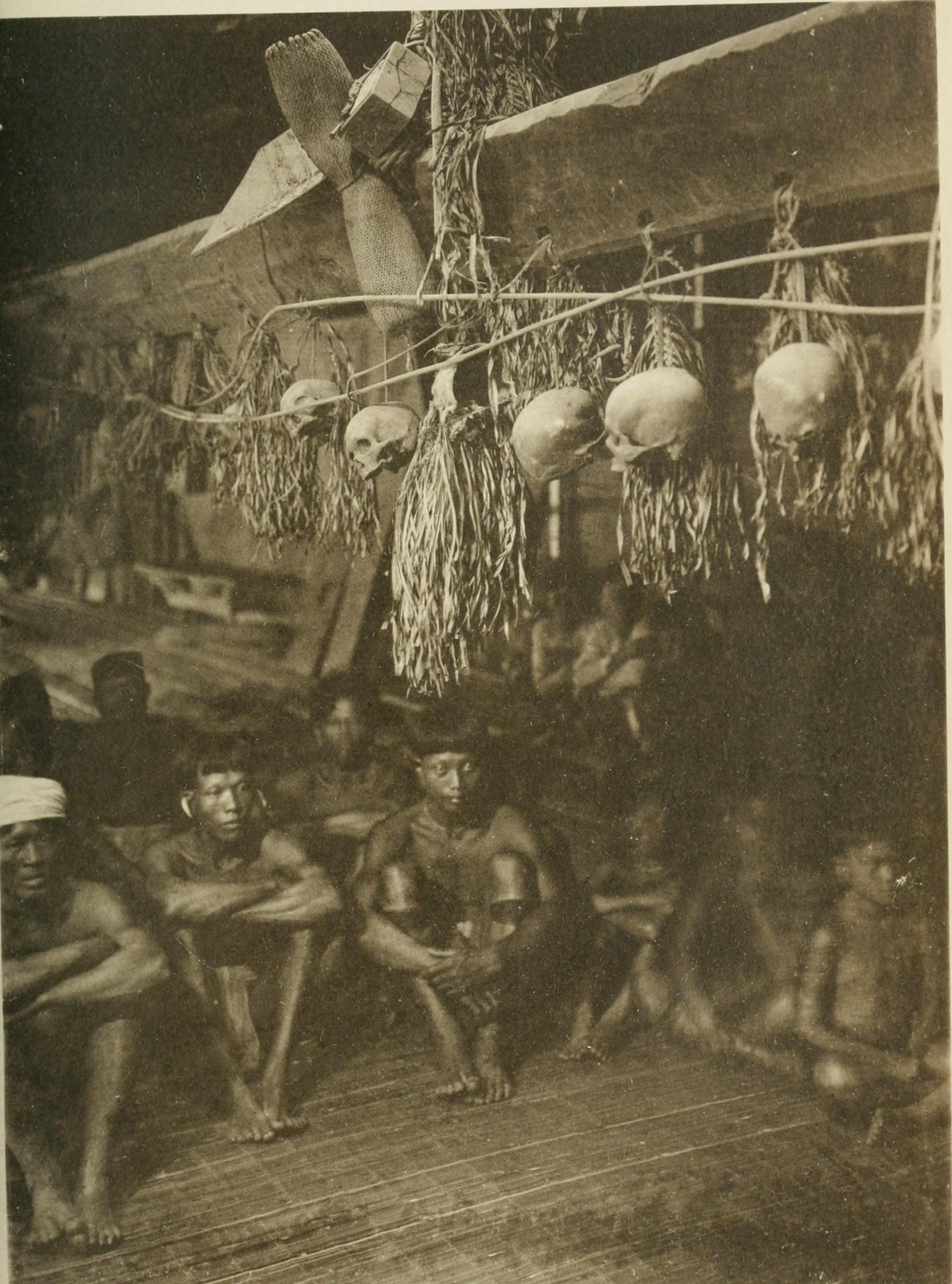
The Dayak longhouse

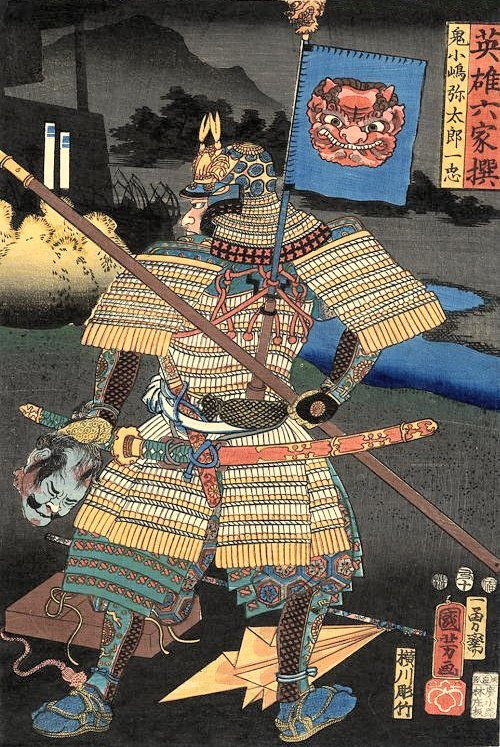
Japanese samurai holding a severed head

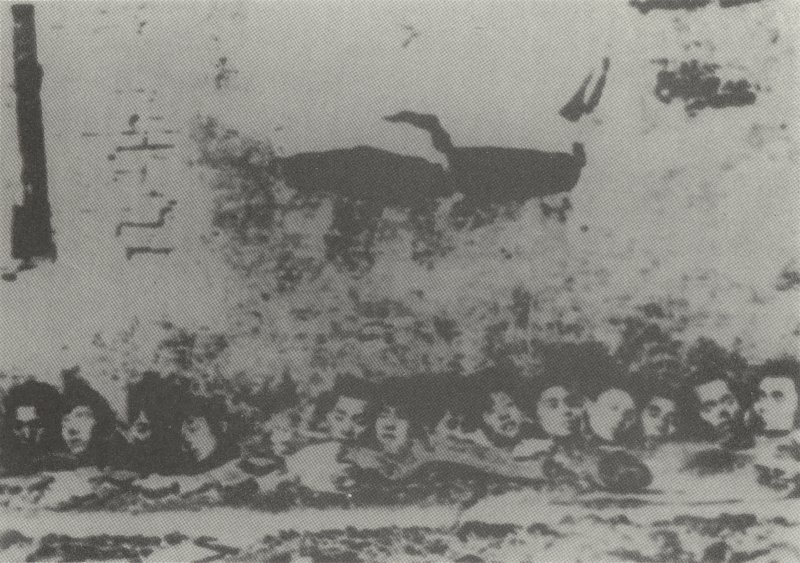
Severed heads of bandits Tieling, Manchuria, in 1928, during the government of Zhang Xueliang

== See also ==
- Shrunken head
- Scalping
- Decapitation
- Skull cup
- Human sacrifice
- Human trophy collecting
- Macheteros de Jara
- Laulasi Island
- Beheading in Islam
- Headless Horseman
- Plastered human skulls
- Crypteia, a Spartan organization who routinely practised headhunting against the servile Helot population.
- Tribal warfare
