= Yayasan Merah Putih =

Indonesian non-profit organization

Yayasan Merah Putih (YMP)
- Founded: December 14, 1989
- Type: Non-governmental organization
- Purpose: Environmentalism
- Location: Central Sulawesi, Indonesia
- Region served: Regional
- Method: Lobbying, research, fieldwork
- Key people: Amran Tambaru
- Employees: 30
- Website: ymp.or.id

The Merah Putih Foundation (YMP – Yayasan Merah Putih) is a non-governmental, non-profit organization first established on December 14, 1989, in Palu, Central Sulawesi, Indonesia. Since 1992, YMP has focused on advocacy work and on efforts to empower local communities in Central Sulawesi, both indigenous peoples and peasant societies.

Yayasan Merah Putih is an independent organization that has a strong civil society movement among local communities in Central Sulawesi, providing them both with the skill and ability to manage their natural resources and sustain their environment, based on all local resources, including economic, political, social and cultural aspects, to ensure good circumstances of life, justice, and non-violence. Today YMP's efforts focus on two groups of people: helping the Tau Taa Wana deal with the process of social change that is engulfing them, and working with local farmers in the Luwuk district to get access to justice.

YMP has nine “principles and ethical values”. These are:

- Democracy and equality for all
- Respect of Human Rights and Gender Equality
- Participation and engagement of affected people
- Prioritization of local resources
- Orientation in the process of every activity, ensuring a learning process
- Group Work and assurance of transparency in every activity
- Avoidance of violence in solving problems
- Rejection of programs or projects financed through loans
- Preparation to face all risks, both political and economic

== Support for indigenous tribes ==
In 1999 a group of the Tau Taa Wana tribe people in Central Sulawesi, Bulang, near Ampana wrote a letter to YMP expressing their concern over the Indonesian governments transmigration departments plans of extension. This appeal brought YMP to the Wana area and since then, with long-term support from the Rainforest Foundation Norway, YMP has provided continuous assistance to the Wana tribe.

To help, YMP obtained official documents concerning planned transmigration extensions by the government, enabling the organization of the Wana. YMP also set up numerous community meetings. This has checked the extension of transmigration but there are still cases of transmigrants extending their fields into Wana land.

A newer policy of YMP, since 2007, has been the implementation of 'sekolah lipu' or village schools in nine Tau Taa Wana villages to educate the Wana people by teaching Indonesian and mathematics so that they can get a fair price for their products.
