= Wana people =

Tau Taa Wana people Tau Ta'a Wana / Wana / Tao Taa Wana / To Wana
Regions with significant populations
- Indonesia (Central Sulawesi)

Languages
- Pamona language (Waa dialect), Indonesian language

Religion
- Ancestral worship (predominantly), Christianity, Islam

Related ethnic groups
- Pamona people

The Tau Taa Wana (sometimes Tau Ta'a Wana or Tao Taa Wana) is a sub-group of the numerous people who speak variants of the Ta'a or Pamona language of Eastern Central Sulawesi, Indonesia. The Tau Taa Wana people referred to themselves as Tao Taa, as in tao means "people" and taa means "not". But most outsiders refers them as To Wana which means "people in the forest" because of their social image as a community residing in forests.

The Tau Taa Wana people are an indigenous tribe who live in small villages or lipu's around the Bulang and Bongka River. Since the year 2000, the Wana have implemented rotational farming as a means of maintaining themselves. Before this they lived as a nomadic tribe.

The Tau Taa Wana are currently under threat. This is mainly constituted over land trouble. Since 1994 incursions from the government of Indonesia's transmigration program have affected their traditional ways of life. Yayasan Merah Putih is a non-profit, NGO in Palu that has been a supporter of Wana rights since 1999 and has also introduced sekolah lipu's or village schools in order to help the Tau Taa Wana community.
