= Pamona people =

Ethnic group of Indonesia

Pamona
To Pamona, Poso, Bare'e
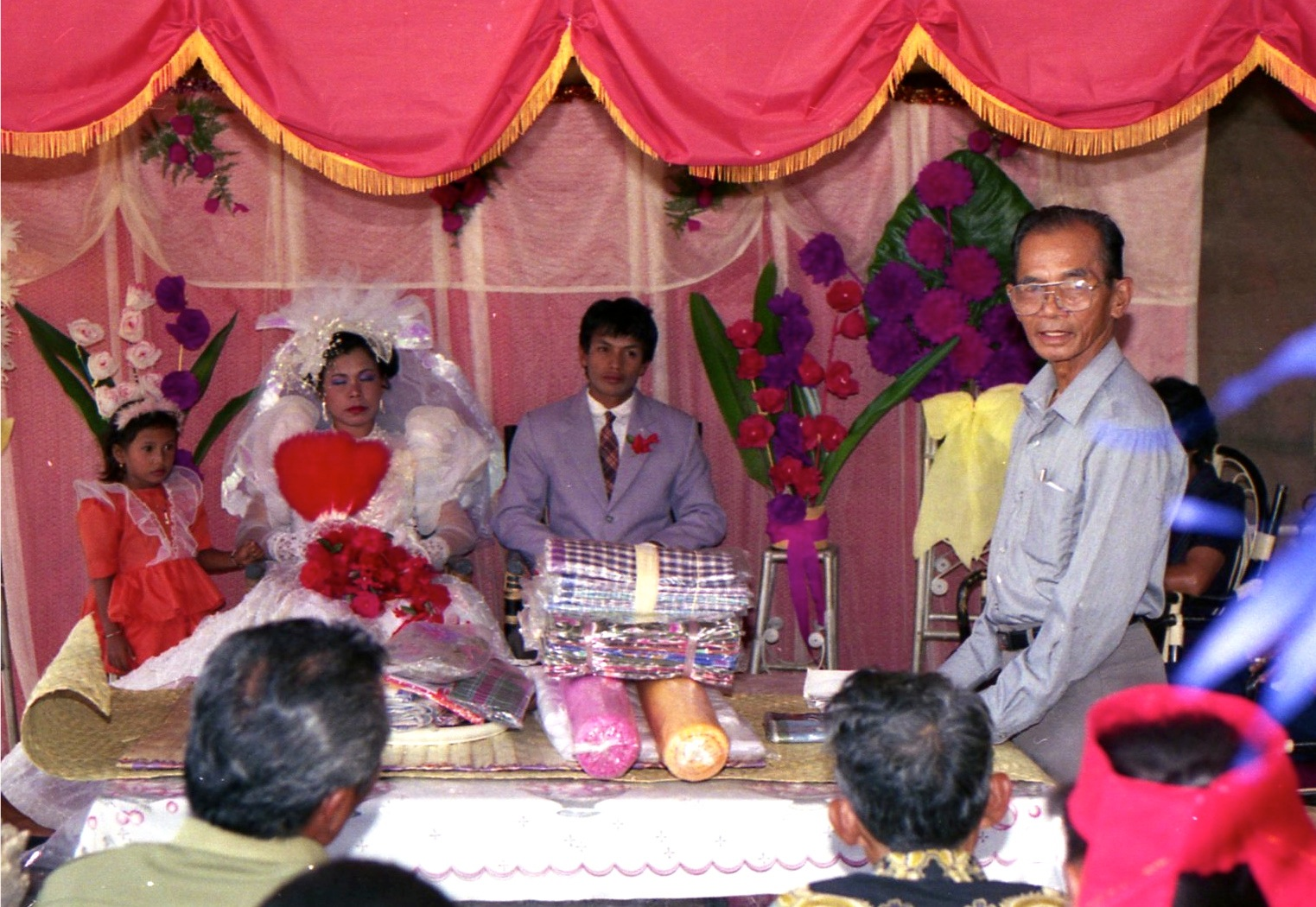
- The exchange of cotton cloth (bride-wealth) at a To Pamona wedding in 1991.

Total population
- 167,000

Regions with significant populations
- Indonesia (Central Sulawesi & South Sulawesi)

Languages
- Pamona, Indonesian

Religion
- Christianity (predominantly) Islam (minority)

Related ethnic groups
- Kaili, Tau Taa Wana, Toraja, Poso Pesisir

The Pamona (often referred to as Poso, Bare'e, or To Pamona) people is an ethnic group of Indonesia. They inhabit almost the entire Poso Regency, parts of Tojo Una-Una Regency and parts of North Morowali Regency, Central Sulawesi; in fact there are some even in East Luwu Regency of South Sulawesi, whereas a small remainder lives in other parts of Indonesia.

The ancestors of the Pamona people originally came from the land of Salu Moge (East Luwu Regency, South Sulawesi) because they were once from the mountains which is far from the central governance thus they were brought down by Macoa Bawalipu of Wotu, East Luwu Regency to be nearer to the central governance, which is the surrounding region of Mangkutana (East Luwu Regency). But it was until a revolt by the DI/TII rebellion broke out that they spread to Central Sulawesi and to other regions. If there are Pamona people in certain regions, then it is common that a Rukun Poso (Poso community association) is formed there, which serves as a means of a group of people from a common ethnic background to engage in various activities within the region. Almost all of the Pamona people practices Christianity. Christianity came into the region at the end of the 19 century and until today it is widely accepted as the religion of the people. Today, all churches of common denomination are grouped under the Central Sulawesi Christian Church headquartered in Tentena, Poso Regency, Central Sulawesi, Indonesia. A large part of the common folk uses Pamona and Indonesian language that is mixed with the local slang. The Pamona people are usually farmers, government officials, pastors, entrepreneurs and so on.

== Origins ==
As a matter of fact, the Pamona people are not identical with the Poso people. This is because in anthropological terms there is no Poso people but only a geographical region called Poso, which is inhabited by the Pamona people. There is also a belief that the word poso came from the word maposo in the local To Pobare'e language which means "break". Whereas according to several notable Poso people, the word poso actually came from the word poso'o that means "fasterner" or "bonds", that gave the name to Poso city with the intention to bind or to unite among the Pamona people that came from the mountains (lake side) and also those that came from the coastal region. While the origin of the name Poso which means "break" is said to have started from the formation of Lake Poso. Apparently Lake Poso was formed from a slab of earth from a hill, where below the slab of earth was a spring of water. Surrounding the mountains are the low lands, until the water flow from the mountains filled around the mountain. The pool of water eroded the earth around the hill until the water penetrate the earth exposing the groundwater. As a result, this caused an abrasion to a volatile soil structure that is somewhat sandy. Slowly the hillside was unable to withstand the weight of the hill above it, causing a landslide that brought the hill down into the wallow of spring below the mountain until a small lake was formed. For the Pamona community, the event of the collapse of the mountain is often mentioned until they coined the word "Lake Poso" which is given as a name to the then newly formed lake. Over time, the lake expanded because of the water source from around the mountain flowed to the new lake. Consequently, the water level of the lake began to rise until the breadth of the lake's surface expended and became wider. (2008As the water begin to continually fill the lake until the lake could no longer contained it, a river was formed and flowed towards the coastal region. As the river came from Lake Poso, therefore it was named with the same name, Poso River. The river mouth of the newly formed river is then occupied by a sizable population, as there is an abundance of fish found in the river. Thus, it is said that the group of the new residents then named the village with the name, "Poso".

There are several ethnics that lived in Poso and they are known as:

- Pamona
- Poso Pesisir
- Mori
- Bada
- Napu
- Tojo
- Kaili
- Padoe
- Lore
- Taa Wana

== Pamona Customary Foundation ==
The name Pamona also refers to an association of a few ethnics, which is the abbreviation for Pakaroso Mosintuwu Naka Molanto (Pamona). Later Pamona became an ethnic group that were unified under the governance of Dutch colonial. The name Pamona was declared in Tentena, and even a commemoration of the declaration was made by erecting a monument called Watu Mpoga'a as a remembrance of their origin and also naming of a street, Pamona. Historically, the institutionalized of the Pamona customs was previously divided by a few authorities. For Poso, it was led by Datue Poso and a few of his kabosenya (meaning, elders) that represent each of their own ethnic groups. If in Luwuland, it is led by Makole Tawi and the existence of the institution of Pamona customary currently is divided into two assemblies in Poso, namely Majelis Adat Lemba Pamona Poso, while in Luwuland (East Luwu Regency and North Luwu Regency) is the Lembaga Adat Lemba Pamona Luwu. At the moment, the existence of these assemblies are still preserved by the Pamona community be it those that are in Mangkutana, East Luwu Regency and North Luwu Regency, nor those that are in Poso Regency.

== Language ==
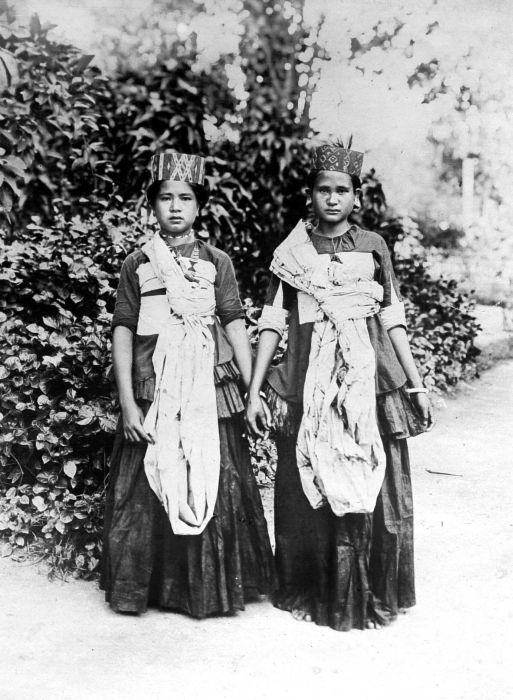
Two girls wearing festive dresses, Poso, Sulawesi, circa 1920–1930.

The language that is used by the Pamona people is called Pamona language. The structure of Pamona language is unique in terms of syllables of the root word, where a root word may have different meanings when a prefix, suffix, inserts or affixes are added. An example of a root word that have been changed after a prefix, suffix or affix is added and forms different meanings to it, such as:-

	Pamona language	Bahasa Indonesia	English
Root word	Ja'a	Jahat	Evil, Bad
Prefix	Maja'a; Kaja'a	Rusak, Jahat; Kejahatan	Spoilt, Damage; Crime, Wickedness
Suffix	Ja'andaya; Ja'anya; Ja'asa; Ja'ati	Kemarahan; Kerugiannya, sayangnya Alangkah jahatnya Dirusaki	Anger; Loss; How wicked is that Tempered, Damaged
Affix	Kakaja'ati	Sayang (untuk barang yang rusak)	How wasted, What a waste
Inserts	Ja'a-ja'a	Buruk	Bad, Not good

Another example:-

	Pamona language	Bahasa Indonesia	English
Root word	Monco	Benar	True
Affix	Kamonconya	Sesungguhnya, Sebenarnya	Indeed, Actually
Suffix	Moncoro; Moncou	Bersiaga; Terayun	Alert; Swung
Inserts	Monco-monco	Sungguh-sungguh	Earnest

There are also several root words that are classified as inventive words (just like the previous examples which are part of inventive words but are not classified as inventive words) with only a change of the alphabetical positions, thus creating another meaning. For example:-

Pamona language	Bahasa Indonesia	English
Soe	Ayun	Swing
Soa	Kosong	Empty
Sue	Mencontoh	Imitate
Sia	Sobek	Torn
Sou, Sau	Turunkan	Lower down
Sua	Masuk	Enter
Sai	Kais	As in a chicken digging the ground with its claws
Seo	Sobek (karena lapuk)	Worn out

The Pamona language is unique where there are numerous phase of syllables that can be twisted to form a different meaning, for instance:-

Pamona language	Bahasa Indonesia	English
Mekaju	Mencari kayu bakar	Finding firewood
Mokuja	Sedang berbuat apa?	What are you doing?
Makuja	Bertanya mengenai jenis kelamin bayi yang baru lahir	Inquiring the gender of a newborn baby
Makijo	Bunyi teriakan riuh sebangsa monyet	Sound of a primate shouting
Mokeju	Bersanggama	Copulate

Other examples:-

Pamona language	Bahasa Indonesia	English
Koyo	Usung	Stretcher
Kuya	Jahe	Ginger
Kayu	Usungan yang terbuat dari pelepah rumbia	A sort of stretcher made of sago palm leaves
Koyu	Simpul tali berkali-kali pada suatu rentang tali	Weaving of knots into a form of a rope

Pamona language	Bahasa Indonesia	English
Lio	Wajah	Face
Lou	Ayun badan kebawah	Swinging downwards
Lau	Berada di tempat yang lebih rendah	Located at lower lands
Lua	Muntah	Vomit
Loe	Jinjing	Tote
Liu	Lewat	Late

== Art ==
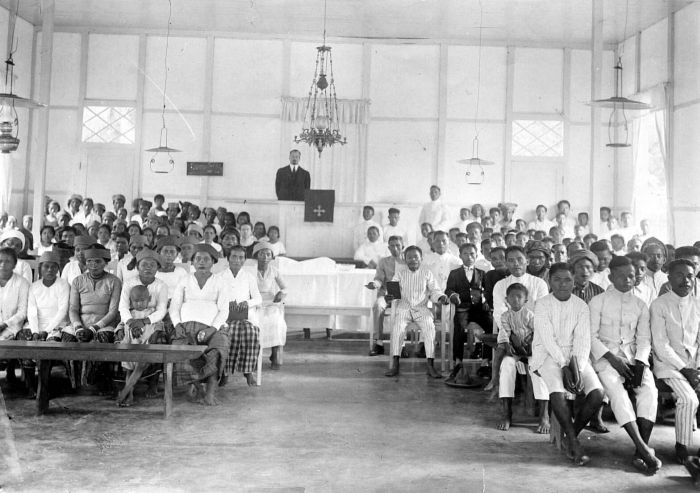
Celebration of Eucharist in Poso, Sulawesi, 1937.

=== Music ===
Traditionally, the Pamona people have a style of music in a form of spoken word poetry. An example of this style of music frequently sung among village folk in the 1940s:-

Pamona language	Bahasa Indonesia	English
Ee nona ee nona iwenu pai nu kabaga? Pai ku kabaga, bonce be manana, Ee bonce, ee bonce, iwenu pai be manana? Pai be manana, kaju wota-wota, Ee kaju, ee kaju, iwenu pai nu ka wota? Pai ku ka wota, na tudusi uja, Ee uja, ee uja, iwenu pai nu katudu? Pai ku katudu, da napandiu ntumpa, Ee tumpa, ee tumpa, iwenu pai nu pandiu? Pai ku pandiu, da natungku ule, Ee ule, ee ule, iwenu pai nu patungku? Pai ku patungku, kina'a ntu'aku,	Eh nona, mengapa perutmu buncit? Perutku buncit karena makan bubur yang tidak matang, Eh bubur, mengapa engkau tidak matang? Karena (dimasak dengan) kayu bakar basah, Eh kayu, mengapa engkau (kayu bakar) basah? Aku (kayu bakar) basah karena hujan turun, Eh hujan, mengapa engkau turun? Aku (hujan) turun karena akan dipakai kodok untuk mandi, Eh kodok, mengapa engkau mandi (air hujan)? Aku (kodok) mandi, karena aku akan di santap ular, Eh ular, mengapa engkau (hendak) menyantap si kodok? Aku (ular) akan menyantap kodok, (karena) makanan moyangku,	Eh lady, eh lady, why is your stomach distended? My stomach is distended because I ate uncooked porridge, Eh porridge, eh porridge, why are you uncooked? I'm uncooked because I was cooked with wet firewood, Eh wood, eh wood, why are you wet? I'm wet because of the rain, Eh rain, eh rain, why did you rained down? I rained down because the frog wants to bathe, Eh frog, eh frog, why do you want to bathe? I wanted to bathe because the snake is going to eat me, Eh snake, eh snake, why do you want to eat the frog? I want to eat the frog because that is the food of my ancestors,

=== Dance ===
Dero or Madero dance is a popular dance among the Pamona people. This dance are usually seen during festivals and normally the dancers are young people. This dance is done in circular motion with hands holding each other while exchanging poems accompanied by joyful music. In a few districts in Palu forbids Dero or Madero dancing activities because it often becomes the cause of scuffles among young boys who seek the attention of young girls. The Dero dance is differentiated by three types of swaying and footwork movements by the rhythm of the music. The first is called ende ntonggola, where two steps are taken to the right, a step backwards and then repeat. This dance is performed during the fullmoon celebration, which indicates the season for preparing the land for farming. The time for farming begins when the fullmoon ends. The following dance movement is called ende ngkoyoe or ende ntoroli, that is two steps to the right and a step to the left. This dance movement is meant during the time of collecting the harvest, during special occasion, or festivals. The final dance movement is called ende ada (customary), which is performed during the celebration of customary holidays or festivals. The dance movements are the same as ende ntoroli, except that the dancers do not hold each other's hands. The Dero dance also forms as a means of courting in public, except for Raego dance which is rather cultural and not associated with courting.

== Surnames ==
Pamona surnames include:-

- Awundapu
- Banumbu
- Bali'e
- Baloga
- Belala
- Betalino
- Beto
- Botilangi
- Bulinde
- Bungkundapu
- Bungu
- Buntinge
- Bakumawa
- Dike
- Dongalemba
- Gilirante
- Gimbaro
- Gugu
- Gundo
- Kaluti
- Kampindo
- Kambodji
- Kalembiro
- Kalengke
- Karape
- Karebungu
- Kayori
- Kayupa
- Koedio
- Kogege
- Kolombuto
- Kolobinti
- Kuko
- Lakiu
- Langgari
- Ladjamba
- Lambangasi
- Labiro
- Liante
- Lidongi
- Lu'o
- Lumaya
- Lolongudju
- Manganti
- Meringgi
- Mogadi
- Mossepe
- Mowose
- Monepa
- Monipo
- Nyolo-nyolo
- Nggau
- Nggo'u
- Nua
- Nyaua
- Pakuli
- Palaburu
- Parimo
- Pariu
- Paroda
- Pasunu
- Patara
- Pebadja
- Penina
- Pekita
- Penyami
- Pesudo
- Poa
- Pombaela
- Pobonde
- Podala
- Polempe
- Purasongka
- Rangga
- Ratengku
- Pusuloka
- Rampalino
- Rampalodji
- Rantelangi
- Rare'a
- Ruagadi
- Rubo
- Rumbani
- Ruutana
- Satigi
- Sancu'u
- Sawiri
- Sigilipu
- Sipatu
- So'e
- Sowolino
- Tabanci
- Tadanugi
- Tadalangi
- Tadale
- Tadadja
- Tadjaji
- Talasa
- Tambo'eo
- Tarante
- Tasiabe
- Tawuku
- Tawurisi
- Tekora
- Tepara
- Tiladuru
- Tolala
- Tobondo
- Tobogu
- Tolimba
- Torau
- Toumbo
- Tumonggi
- Turuka
- Ule
- Ululai
- Warara
- Wenali
- Werokila nce'i to mori
- Wuri
- Wutabisu

== See also ==
- 2002 Poso bus attacks
- 2005 Indonesian beheadings of Christian girls
