= Pamona language =

Austronesian language spoken in Sulawesi, Indonesia

Pamona
- Poso or Bare’e
- Native to: Indonesia
- Region: Central Sulawesi; South Sulawesi
- Ethnicity: Pamona
- Native speakers: (140,000 cited 2000)
- Language family: Austronesian: Malayo-Polynesian; Celebic; Kaili–Pamona; Northern; Pamona

Language codes
- ISO 639-3: pmf
- Glottolog: pamo1252
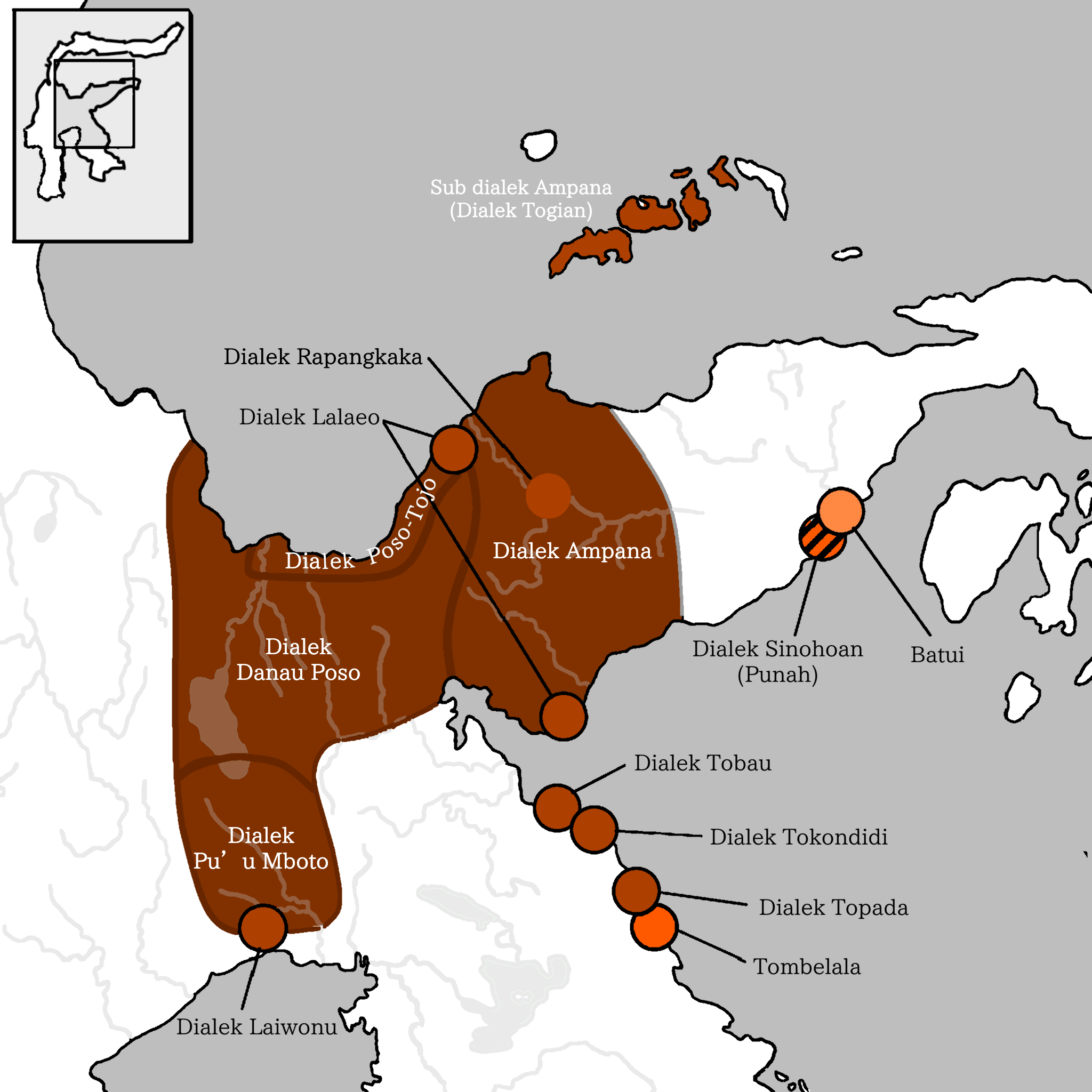

Pamona (also Poso or Bare’e) is an Austronesian language spoken in Central and South Sulawesi, Indonesia. It is part of the northern group of the Kaili–Pamona languages.

== Dialects ==
Ethnologue lists the following as dialects: Laiwonu (Iba), Pamona (Poso), Rapangkaka (Aria), Taa (Topotaa, Wana), Tobau (Bare’e, Tobalo, Tobao), Tokondindi, Tomoni, and Topada.

The Poso dialect is the prestige dialect, specifically the variety spoken in the interior around Lake Poso. The coastal Poso variety (Poso Pesisir) – mostly spoken by Muslims in the trading hub Poso – does not differ significantly from the interior prestige variety (e.g. it uses the same negator bare'e as the interior variety), but has undergone some lexical influence from Buginese and the Parigi dialect of Kaili.

== Phonology ==
Pamona has the following sound inventory:

Consonants
		Labial	Alveolar	Palatal	Velar	Glottal
Plosive	voiceless	p	t		k	ʔ
Plosive	voiced	b	d	ɟ	g	
Prenasalized plosive	voiceless	ᵐp	ⁿt	ᶮc	ᵑk	
Prenasalized plosive	voiced	ᵐb	ⁿd	ᶮɟ	ᵑg	
Fricative			s			h
Nasal		m	n	ɲ	ŋ	
Trill			r			
Approximant		ʋ	l	j		

Vowels
	Front	Central	Back
Close	i		u
Close-Mid	e		o
Open		a	

== Bibliography ==
- Adriani, Nicolaus (1931). Spraakkunst der Bare'e-Taal. Verhandelingen van het Koninklijk Bataviaasch Genootschap van Kunsten en Wetenschappen, LXX. Bandung: A. C. Nix.
