= Nieuwe Bijbelvertaling =

2004 Dutch translation of the Bible

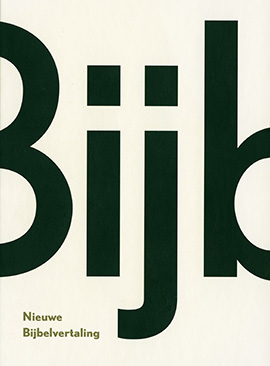
- White standard edition cover, designed by Bart Rouwhorst
- Other names: New Bible Translation
- Abbreviation: NBV
- Language: Dutch
- Complete Bible published: 2004
- Textual basis: OT: BHS; DC: SVTG; NT: NA27
- Revision: NBV21
- Publisher: Dutch-Flemish Bible Society; Catholic Bible Foundation
- Copyright: © 2004 Nederlands-Vlaams Bijbelgenootschap, Haarlem/Antwerpen. All rights reserved.
- Religious affiliation: Ecumenical
- Website: https://www.debijbel.nl/bijbel/NBV
- Genesis 1:1–3 In het begin schiep God de hemel en de aarde. De aarde was nog woest en doods, en duisternis lag over de oervloed, maar Gods geest zweefde over het water. God zei: ‘Er moet licht komen,’ en er was licht. John 3:16 Want God had de wereld zo lief dat hij zijn enige Zoon heeft gegeven, opdat iedereen die in hem gelooft niet verloren gaat, maar eeuwig leven heeft.

The Nieuwe Bijbelvertaling (lit. 'New Bible Translation'; NBV) is an ecumenical Dutch-language Bible translation, published by the Dutch-Flemish Bible Society and the Catholic Bible Foundation in 2004. A revision of the NBV, the NBV21, was released in late 2021.

The NBV is a commonly used translation in the Dutch-speaking world. A diverse group of churches have used the NBV in their liturgy, such as the Protestant Church in the Netherlands and the Reformed Churches in the Netherlands (Liberated). The Catholic Church regards the Nieuwe Bijbelvertaling positively, but did not include it in their lectionarium.

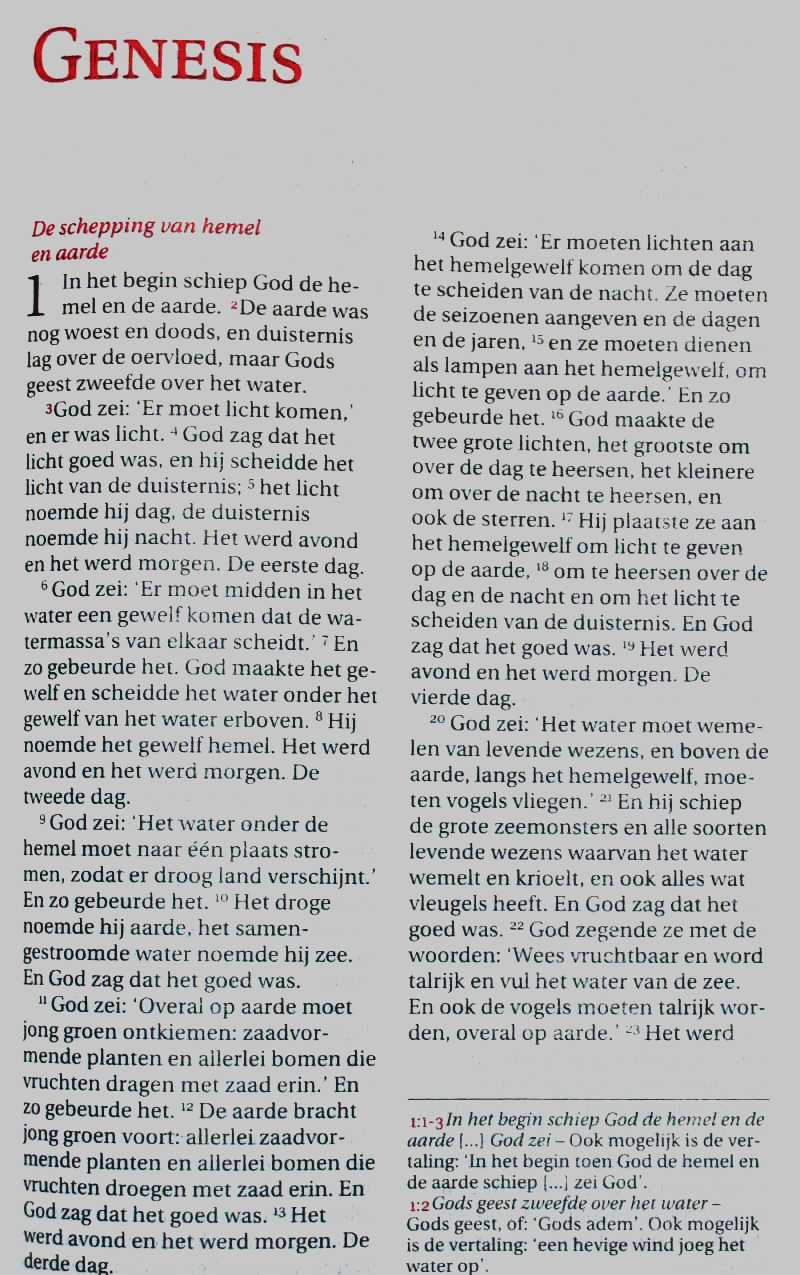
The beginning of Genesis 1

== Background ==
In 1965, the Council for Contact and Deliberation regarding the Bible (RCOB) (Note: Dutch: Raad voor Contact en Overleg betreffende de Bijbel) was established, which then requested the Dutch-Flemish Bible Society (NBG) (Note: Then known as the Dutch Bible Society (Dutch: Nederlandse Bijbelgenootschap)) and the Catholic Bible Foundation (KBS) (Note: Dutch: Katholieke Bijbelstichting) to produce a common Bible translation. After several attempts and initiatives, the intention to create a new ecumenical Bible translation was expressed in a 1989 conference of the RCOB, with the presence of the NBG and the KBS. The NBG asked the religious communities in the RCOB and the Nederlands Israëlitisch Kerkgenootschap in 1990 whether there was a need for such a translation, to which there were affirmative responses. On 25 February 1993, the NBG and KBS signed a declaration of intention to realize a new translation of the Bible.

== Process ==
Work on the translation began in 1993, which was executed a team within the headquarters of the Dutch Bible Society in Haarlem, within which the Catholic Bible Foundation, the Flemish Bible Society and the Flemish Bible Foundation all worked.

The translation was executed by a team of translators, whereby each Biblical book was translated by a pair: an expert of the source language and an expert of the Dutch language, or a poet for poetic text. Thus was it strived to connect to the Dutch language of the modern day. The translation was examined by supervisors of different churches and of the literary sphere. A Flemish panel of readers were also included, who ensured the translation did not contain constructions which were only used by Dutch people (so-called hollandisms). The most important decisions were ultimately taken by the monitoring committee. At the end of the translation process, the final editors monitored, among other things, the alignment of the translation with the source.

The general public were informed regularly through the brochure series NBV Informatie and through interim publications under the title of Werk in uitvoering. In 1998, a selection of Biblical books in this translation under the name "Werk in uitvoering" was released. In 2000, the second set of books were released, these being: Genesis, Zechariah, Tobit, Mark, 1 Corinthians and Revelation. In December 2003, "Werk in uitvoering 3" was released, wherein the books of Ruth, Amos, Sirach, and Luke were revealed. Moreover, the publications of Werk in uitvoering discuss the translatory choices within the books in detail. Public discussions over these choices sometimes led to edits to the translation.

== Method ==
The translatory method of the NBV has been described with the words brontekstgetrouw, 'source text faithful'; and doeltaalgericht, 'target language focused'. The objective of the translation was to display as much of the properties of the source text in natural language. In the method of the NBV, the words brontekstgetrouw and doeltaalgericht are two aspects of the same affair: a translation is faithful to the source text if all meaningful elements in the source text emerge naturally in the target language.

The aspect of brontekstgetrouw means that the source text is the starting point of the NBV. The texts are translated as consistent wholes, not as a loose collection of words and sentences. The special properties of the source text, such as style and genre, are respected. For example, the translators maintained the same style for the Dutch translation as the original Biblical text: if the Hebrew or Greek text is poetic, formal, or simple, then the translation shall be thus.

The aspect of doeltaalgericht means that the translation is constructed with natural Dutch grammar. Hebrew, Aramaic, or Greek sentential constructions are converted to Dutch constructions. Particular attention was also paid to the legibility of the translation.

The characteristics of text and of language are distinguished in the NBV. Textual characteristics are specific functions of a text that contribute substantially to its meaning. They are particular to this one text (for example, stylistic peculiarities of a writer). Text features are intended to be recognizable in translation. Linguistic characteristics are properties of the source language (e.g. word order). Such characteristics are dissolved into the natural characteristics of the Dutch text. For instance, the NBV translates the Old Testament using Dutch equivalents rather than presenting Hebraisms, such as the Hebrew genitive, which often appears in older translations such as the Statenvertaling.

== General characteristics ==
=== Textual basis ===
The textual basis of the NBV is derived from three leading scientific publications, aligning with the standards of the United Bible Societies (UBS).

- The textual basis of the Old Testament is the Biblia Hebraica Stuttgartensia.
- The basis of the Deuterocanon is the Göttingen Septuagint.
- The basis of the New Testament is the 27th edition of the Novum Testamentum Graece.

=== Footnotes ===
The NBV has a limited amount of footnotes. They appear in certain instances of wordplay, important terms, notable deviant translations, and problems of textual criticism.

In the first editions of the NBV, cross-references were omitted from the text. Instead there was a list of references at the end of the book, in addition to a glossary. In some later editions of the NBV, cross-references are placed at the bottom of pages.

=== Names ===
The names of individuals are written as agreed upon by the Bible societies in 1988. In the process they concluded that these agreements should be re-evaluated.

=== Name of God ===
The name of God in the Old Testament, the tetragrammaton, is written in the NBV as heer (lit. 'LORD'). The NBV thus accords with ancient Jewish and Christian literary traditions. The reading guide near the beginning of the NBV states that one may also read another name in place of heer, such as: Aanwezige, (Note: The one who is present) Eeuwige, (Note: The one who is eternal) Enige, (Note: The one who is unitary) God, He(e)re, (Note: Lord) Levende, (Note: The one who lives) de Naam and Onnoembare. (Note: The unnameable) The translators stated that their justification for this decision was that "Lord", alongside "Eternal", was the widely chosen rendering in Bible translations, so “Lord” also functions as a proper name for many people. Two objections were raised here: "Lord" reinforces an exclusively male representation of God and "Lord" is not a proper name. However, the alternatives also have drawbacks: ''YHWH" is unpronounceable without vowels and 'Eternal' and other epithets are not proper names either.

In the Tanakhic edition of 2007, which was developed in collaboration with the Jewish foundation Sja'ar, the name of God is replaced with "de eeuwige" (the eternal). In the Study Bible of 2008, the name of God is shown as "jhwh", the Dutch transliteration of the tetragrammaton.

The translation of the tetragrammaton was the subject of extensive discussions during the creation of the NBV, with tempers running high at times. In 1994, the Guidance commission decided to opt for the traditional heer. This was a solution out of embarrassment, as all other alternatives were opposed. After the release of the first published portions in 1998, action was taken to revise this decision, with the most important argument being that "Lord" was an exclusively masculine, one-dimensional, and authoritarian rendition of God's name. On 7 December 1999, a study was executed into this issue, with the results being published in the magazine Met Andere Woorden. The brochure NBV Informatie also covered the issue. After a careful investigation by the Coordination team and the Guidance commission of the NBV project, and then advisory commissions and an executive committee of the NBG and the KBS, the combined governance of the NBG and the KBS decided on 16 February 2001 that the rendering HEER accorded the most with the principles and objectives of the Nieuwe Bijbelvertaling.

=== Reverential capitalization ===
Reverential capitalization in the NBV is sparingly used. Pronouns (such as he, his, himself) are not capitalized, even if they refer to God. Various religious terms (such as temple, ark, etc.) are also not capitalized. However, capitals are still present in personal names, names of the God of Israel, the persons of the trinity ("Father", "Son" and "Ghost"), exceptional titles for God and Jesus (such as "Almighty", "Son of Man"), titles of Biblical divisions ("Writings", "Law and Prophets"), personifications and names of feasts.

=== Inclusive translation ===
Due to the lack of visibility of women in many translations of the Bible, the NBV re-includes them in several passages. Some examples of the re-inclusion of women in translation are:

- Where men and women are spoken of together, the Greek language uses the masculine plural pronoun. Therefore, the NBV often translates αδελφοί (adelfoí; lit. 'brothers') with "brothers and sisters."
- In Acts 1:16, ἄνδρες ἀδελφοί (ándres adelfoí; NBG51: "mannen broeders"; lit. 'men brothers') is translated as "brothers and sisters" on the basis of the fact that women were also present in the reference (Acts 1:14).
- The NBG51 translates the feminine names Junia in Romans 16:7 with the non-existent masculine name "Junias" and adds that it refers to men in this instance ("mannen, onder de apostelen in aanzien"; lit. 'men, among the esteemed apostles'). In the NBV, Junia is presented to be among the esteemed apostles.
- In Ephesians 5:22, the NBG51 starts a new paragraph in the middle of a sentence. The NBV reconnects the two parts of the sentence ("wees elkander onderdanig, [...] de vrouwen aan de mannen"; lit. 'be subject to one another, [...] the women to the men') back together, such that the passage now reads that the desired attitude of wives towards their husbands is the same disposition that all Christians should have towards each other, regardless of gender.

=== Preservation of source culture ===
In the NBV, exotic elements from the culture of the sources are not translated into relatable elements in the target culture if the reader can infer the meaning from the context. The historical and socio-cultural background of the texts thus remains recognizable. These include customs (eg. "to lay at the table"), images (eg. "the disk of the earth"), functions ("procurator", "rabshakeh") and measures and weights ("stadions", "minas", "metretes").

== Publication and print history ==
On October 27, 2004, the Nieuwe Bijbelvertaling was officially presented in the De Doelen convention center in Rotterdam. During the venue, Queen Beatrix of the Netherlands read aloud the first ten verses of Genesis 1. Several bookshops in the Netherlands held special opening sessions. The first and second printings were sold out within a week. On October 29, 2004, the NBV was presented in Antwerp, Belgium.

The cover of the simplest edition of the Nieuwe Bijbelvertaling displays the opening words of Genesis (Hebrew: בְּרֵאשִׁית בָּרָא אֱלֹהִים, romanized: ḃreʾšiyt ḃaraʾ ʾelohiym) and John (Ancient Greek: Ἐn ἀrchῇ ἦn ὁ lόgoς, romanized: En archī īn o logos). Both books begin with the same words: In the beginning.

There are several available editions of the Nieuwe Bijbelvertaling: a standaard edition with and without the deuterocanon, a home edition, a Catholic edition with deuterocanonical books in the order of the Catholic canon, a church Bible, a literary edition (without verse numbering), a pulpital Bible, a parallel edition (verso: Statenvertaling; recto: NBV), a CD-ROM edition and a downloadable edition. The Jongerenbijbel (lit. 'Youths Bible') has been available since June 17, 2006. Further editions have appeared in the following years, such as the Jewish edition of 2007, which was released in collaboration with the Sja'ar foundation and contains the Hebrew text alongside the translation.

=== Study Bibles ===
In 2008, the NBG and KBS published a study Bible which contains the text of the NBV, with the difference of "heer" (in small caps) being replaced with "jhwh". The study Bible offers general information about the Bible from a scientific perspective. In 2009, a new study Bible was released, the Studiebijbel in perspectief (lit. 'Study Bible in perspective'), which follows a more traditional Christian perspective.

=== Printings ===
Since 2004, general corrections have been continuously implemented and typesetting errors have been corrected. In 2007, the text of the Nieuwe Bijbelvertaling was edited according to the official spellings of the Word list of the Dutch language (the Green Booklet). In addition, the text has been revised in a few places according to the comments of readers.

=== Praise ===
In 2016, the Nieuwe Bijbelvertaling was declared the most important book in an election which was part of the "Year of the Book". In 2016, the cover of the newest edition was chosen as one of the 33 best designed books of 2016. The cover of this edition was designed by Studio Ron van Roon.

== Criticism ==
The use of the word huidvraat (lit. 'skin gluttony' or 'skin disease') in the translation of the Hebrew word צָרַעַת (ṣaraʿat) and the Greek λέπρα (lépra) was questioned.

=== Relation between Old and New Testament ===
The NBV translates the Old Testament without the influence of the New Testament. For the occasions where the Old Testament is cited in the New, these citations can sometimes be difficult to recognize for several reasons: veterotestamentary citations generally come from the Septuagint, and end up differing from the Masoretic Text, or the citation is edited by the neotestamentary author to align with their intentions. A principle of the NBV is that the context wherein the text is cited has precedence over the original context of the cited text. According to critics, many citations become unnoticeable to the reader.

=== Too free ===
Some critics state that the NBV is unfaithful to the textual sources. This criticism originates due to a difference of perspective with regards to the translatory method. In the method of the NBV, words and expressions are translated contextually and various translatory edits are made. Word-for-word translation is therefore subordinated. Critics maintain that faithfulness to the source language requires a greater amount of word-for-word translation and further stringency with edits in translation.

=== Capitalization ===
The Hebrew and Aramaic alphabets lack letter case. This lack is also present in older Greek manuscripts of the New Testament, considering that such manuscripts make use of the Uncial script without exception. Capitalization in the NBV follows the rules of standard Dutch orthography. While it has been common practice since the 18th century to use capitals to display reverence, a practice known as reverential capitalization, the NBV only briefly contains such capitalization. Personal pronouns (he, his, himself) are not capitalized, even if they refer to God. Religious terminology, such as temple and ark, is also uncapitalized. Some have seen this as disrespectful .

== NBV21 ==
The NBV21 is the revised version of the Nieuwe Bijbelvertaling, which was released on October 13, 2021 in several editions.

== Acceptance in churches ==
At the beginning of the production of the Nieuwe Bijbelvertaling in 1993, several denominations agreed to adhere to the project. The translation has been used in many Protestant and Catholic churches.

While the Catholic Church expressed positivity for the Nieuwe Bijbelvertaling, it was decided that the NBV was not to be used in liturgy, where the prescribed lectionary is based on the Willibrordvertaling of 1978, which received an imprimatur in 1980.

In 2004, the Nieuwe Bijbelvertaling was presented to the Protestant Church in the Netherlands (PKN) for approval. During the Protestant synod from April 22 to 23, 2010, the NBV was voted by a large majority to become one of the official Bible translations of the Protestant Church (Of the 146 members present, only 16 voted against; others asked for an adjournment). The decision gave the NBV a status equal to that of the Statenvertaling and the NBG51; one of these three translations must be used in liturgy of a Protestant church "according to preference". However, other translations are not forbidden to be utilized outside liturgy. Critics within the Protestant Church urged the Synod in an open letter to abstain from designating the NBV as a pulpital Bible until a revision of the translation was completed, since they maintained serious objections to the NBV. In a response, the NBG referenced the existing wide acceptance among churchgoers and stated that they had maintained constant contact with churches and scholars during the translation process and that they had always taken comments into account.

The general synod of the Reformed Churches in the Netherlands (Liberated) decided unanimously to accept the NBV for use in worship services and recommended the general use of the NBV. It also noted the possibility of contributing to the process of evaluation and revision of the NBV.
