= NBV21 =

2021 Dutch translation of the Bible

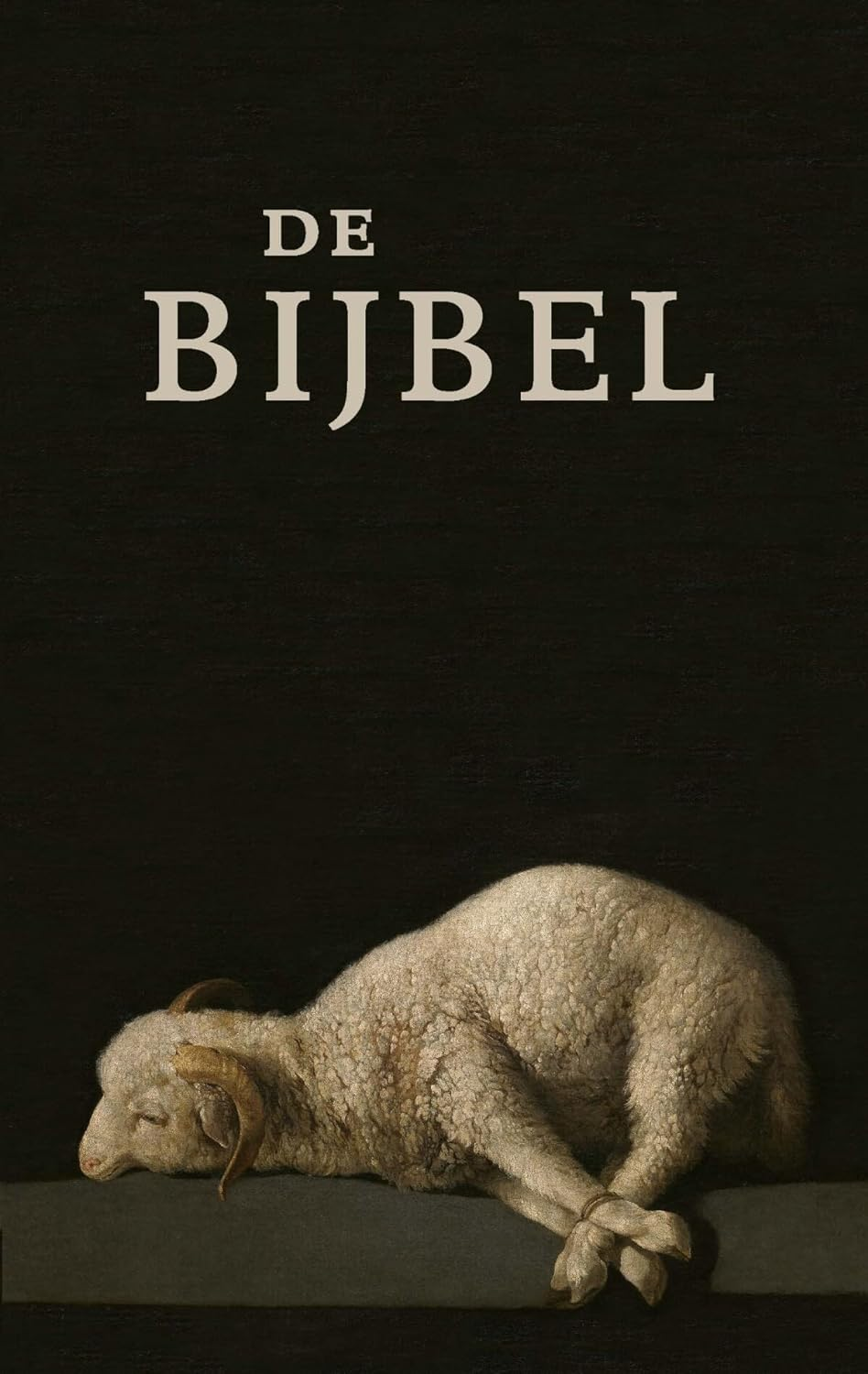
- NBV21 Literary edition cover, featuring the painting Agnus Dei by Spanish artist Francisco de Zurbarán
- Other names: Nieuwe Bijbelvertaling 2021
- Language: Dutch
- Complete Bible published: 2021
- Authorship: Employees and stakeholders NBV21
- Derived from: New Bible Translation
- Textual basis: OT: BHQ; BHS; DC: SVTG; NT: NA28
- Translation type: Functional equivalence
- Publisher: Various; see editions
- Copyright: © 2021 Nederlands-Vlaams Bijbelgenootschap, Haarlem/Antwerpen. All rights reserved.
- Religious affiliation: Ecumenical
- Website: bijbel.nbv21.nl
- Genesis 1:1–3 In het begin schiep God de hemel en de aarde. De aarde was woest en doods, duisternis lag over de oervloed, en over het water zweefde Gods geest. God zei: ‘Laat er licht zijn,’ en er was licht. (Note: lit. 'In the beginning shaped God the heaven and the earth. The earth was desolate and dead, darkness lay over the primordial waters, and over the water hovered God's spirit. God said: "Let there light be," and there was light.') John 3:16 Want God had de wereld zo lief dat Hij zijn enige Zoon heeft gegeven, opdat iedereen die in Hem gelooft niet verloren gaat, maar eeuwig leven heeft. (Note: lit. 'Because God had the world so loved that He His only Son has given, so that everyone who in Him believes not lost goes, but eternal life has.')

The NBV21 is an ecumenical Dutch-language Bible translation, created by the Dutch-Flemish Bible Society (Dutch: Nederlands-Vlaams Bijbelgenootschap; NBG) and published in 2021. The NBV21 is a revised version of the New Bible Translation (Nieuwe Bijbelvertaling; NBV) of 2004. In comparison to the NBV, around 12,000 edits were made to the NBV21. A major difference was the implementation of highly-requested reverential capitalization, in addition to other edits motivated by new discoveries in Biblical studies. Reactions of readers to the previous version were also taken into account in the NBV21.

A revision of the NBV was announced in 2009, before being published on 13 October 2021. The name of the revision itself derives from the intent that the translation may serve as the standard translation for readers in the 21st century. The first printed copy was presented to King Willem-Alexander of the Netherlands, and additional copies were sent to 12 leaders of various religious communities. The introduction of reverential capitalization also received sharp criticism from theological women's organizations, despite being the most requested change from readers.

== Background ==
In 1967, the Council for Contact and Deliberation regarding the Bible (Raad voor Contact en Overleg betreffende de Bijbel; RCOB) was founded as an ecumenical platform to facilitate communication between the Dutch Bible Society (Nederlands Bijbelgenootschap; NBG) and the Catholic Bible Foundation (Katholieke Bijbelstichting; KBS) regarding translation and use of the Bible. After an abandoned and incomplete translation attempt in 1969, the RCOB's first complete effort towards an ecumenical translation of the Bible into Dutch started with the Great News Bible, produced in 1983 and written in vernacular Dutch. However, this translation was deemed insufficient for liturgical use. In 1989, the RCOB declared again the intention to work towards a common Bible translation. The process of translation began in 1993, resulting in the New Bible Translation of 2004. The NBV became one of the standard Bibles of many Protestant churches in the Netherlands; however, traditional Reformed churches continued using the States Translation of 1637. In addition, the NBV was heavily criticized for forgoing reverential capitalization.

== History ==
In 2009, the NBG and KBS declared a revision of this translation, whereby criticism of the NBV would be addressed. In 2016, the Dutch Bible Society began work on the revised translation. The method of translation remained the same, but the NBV21 was tightened and adjusted on certain points compared to the NBV. Nevertheless, edits were performed on almost every page, amounting to a total of around 12,000 edits in comparison to the NBV. According to the foreword of the NBV21, the rationale for the revision originated in suggestions and reactions from readers to the NBV which the society received through emails and letters. In October 2020, the name NBV21 was announced, with the number representing the idea of being the standard translation for readers in the 21st century. The process of translation was finished by early 2021, and the book was released on 13 October 2021. The first printed copy was presented to King Willem-Alexander, a patron of the Dutch-Flemish Bible Society. Copies of the NBV21 were then sent to twelve representatives of various churches and religious communities.

== Method of revision ==
=== Concerns ===
Several small errors in the translation of the NBV were corrected in the NBV21. In some instances, the Dutch grammar was improved. The translation was also adjusted to remain in accordance with scientific findings, while the core of the revision consisted of a slight adjustment of the NBV across the board. In addition, the reactions of readers' wishes were taken into account. Their wishes were converted into the four revisional principles:

1. More consistency: more alignment between texts which are cross-referenced. This includes fixed formulas, casual similarities, allusions and quotations.
2. Functional concordance: making functional word repetitions, such as motifs, more visible in translation without detracting from the Dutch language.
3. Scientific support: proposals for translation, including those made by readers, were tested for scientific support.
4. Less insertion of interpretation: interpretations on the part of the translators have been minimized and texts have been translated more openly when appropriate.

=== Reverential capitalization ===
A notable change in the NBV21 is the implementation of reverential capitalization of personal pronouns which refer to God, Jesus, or the Holy Ghost, which was the most requested change from readers. The main argument against reverential capitalization was that its usage would disappear in language; however, the argument did not prove to be tenable, as its usage continued. The usage of reverential capitalization in the NBV21 is more austere than, for example, is found in the Herziene Statenvertaling (HSV): the NBV21 only capitalizes personal pronouns, while the HSV also capitalizes possessives, among other words. The former is in line with the NBG Translation and the Willibrord translation.

=== Process ===
Like the NBV, the NBV21 was processed through pairs of translators. The first groups of translators made proposals for revision, which were reviewed by the second groups. Then there was input from the translation coordinator, the guidance committee and finally the redactors.

== Translation ==
=== Source texts ===
The textual basis of the Old Testament consists primarily of the Biblia Hebraica Quinta (BHQ). However, since the BHQ was still incomplete during the production of the NBV21, the Biblia Hebraica Stuttgartensia is relied upon as a secondary basis. Footnotes shed light on deviant translations found in the texts of the Aleppo Codex, Aquila's translation, Vulgate, Peshitta, Dead Sea Scrolls, Göttingen Septuagint, Symmachus' translation, Targum, Theodotion's translation, and Vetus Latina. The basis of the Deuterocanon is primarily the Göttingen Septuagint, while textual deviants are included in footnotes under "other manuscripts". Hebrew and Aramaic precursors to the Septuagint are preferred when the Septuagint does not provide a meaningful text. Modern reconstructions of lost Hebrew text are also noted. The primary basis of the New Testament is the Nestle-Aland 28th edition.

=== Notable translatory changes ===
- In the Book of Job, Job's reaction towards God (Job 42:5–6) was drastically changed on the basis of evolved insights in Old Testament studies. In this version, Job does not acknowledge guilt, but instead stops his charge against God as he finds comfort despite his suffering. According to Old Testament scholar Hans Debel, this is "a significant improvement over both the original NBV and most other translations in the Dutch language".
- Certain sections of the Pauline Epistles pertain to the contrast between flesh (Koinē Greek: σάρξ, romanized: sarx) and spirit (πνεῦμα, pneuma), particularly in Romans 7–8 and Galatians 5. In the NBV21, the Greek word sarx in this portion is identified in Dutch as aards, 'earthly': aardse begeerte(n), 'earthly desire(s)'; aardse maatstaven, 'earthly measures'; aardse natuur, 'earthly nature'; het aardse streven, 'the earthly pursuit'; aardse zaken, 'earthly matters'; het aardse, 'the earthly'.
- Three animal names were translated differently, while two were introduced, so that five new animals were present in the NBV21 compared to the NBV. The animals present in the new translation which weren't in the previous version are:
  1. The great cormorant, replacing the fish owl of Deuteronomy 14:17 (Hebrew: שָׁלָך, romanized: šalak);
  2. Monk vulture, replacing the black vulture of Leviticus 11:13 and Deuteronomy 14:12 (פֶּרֶס; ṗeres);
  3. Black kite (דַּיָּה; dayah), not replacing, but being added alongside the red kite (רָאָה; raʾah) of Deuteronomy 14:13;
  4. Eurasian bittern, replacing the porcupine of Isaiah 14:23, 34:11, and Zephaniah 2:14 (קִפוֹד; qipŵd);
  5. One-humped camel, replacing the two-humped camel, although the generic term "camel" is used in most passages unless the kind is known (גָּמָל; gamal).
- A passage in Ecclesiastes (Ecclesiastes 7:26–29), which is often interpreted misogynistically, was translated differently. According to the translators, careful attention for the Hebrew style of the book showed that the writer of Ecclesiastes does not present its own opinion, but is instead quoting a common view, which it then rejects.

Comparison of Ecclesiastes 7:26–29
NBV	Retranslation	NBV21	Retranslation
^{26}En wat ik vind is altijd weer een vrouw die bitterder dan de dood is, die een valstrik is. Haar hart is een klapnet en haar handen zijn ketenen. Een mens die God behaagt zal aan haar ontsnappen, maar een zondaar laat zich door haar strikken. ^{27}Al met al, zegt Prediker, is dat de slotsom van mijn onderzoek. ^{28}Ik heb met hart en ziel gezocht, maar nog altijd niet gevonden. Onder duizend mensen vond ik er maar één die ook werkelijk een mens was, maar het was geen vrouw. ^{29}Alles wat ik vond is dit: de mens is een eenvoudig schepsel. Zo is hij door God gemaakt, maar hij heeft talloze gedachtespinsels.	^{26}And what I find again is always a woman who is a snare is bitterer than death. Her heart is a clap net and her hands are chains. A person who pleases God will escape her, but a sinner lets themselves be ensnared by her. ^{27}All in all, says (the) Preacher, that is the conclusion of my inquiry. ^{28}I have searched with heart and soul, but still have found nothing. Of a thousand people, I found merely one who was truly a person, but it was no woman. ^{29}All I have found is this: the human is a simple creature. Thus is it made by God, but it has countless vague fantasies.	^{26}Altijd weer hoor ik over een vrouw die bitterder zou zijn dan de dood. Een valstrik is zij, haar hart is een klapnet en haar handen zijn ketenen. Een mens die God behaagt zal aan haar ontsnappen, maar een zondaar laat zich door haar strikken. ^{27}Al met al, zegt Prediker, is wat nu volgt de slotsom van mijn onderzoek. ^{28}Dit heb ik met hart en ziel onderzocht: ‘Onder duizend mensen vond ik er maar één die ook werkelijk een mens was, en dat was geen vrouw.’ Maar ik zag dat nooit bevestigd. ^{29}Het enige wat ik vond is dit: de mens is door God rechtschapen gemaakt, maar altijd weer kiest hij de verkeerde wegen.	^{26}Always do I hear about a woman who is bitterer than death. A snare is she, her heart is a clap net and her hands are chains. A person who pleases God will escape her, but a sinner lets themselves be ensnared by her. ^{27}All in all, says (the) Preacher, is what now follows the conclusion of my inquiry. I have inquired this with heart and soul: "Of a thousand people, I found merely one who was truly a person, and that was no woman." But I never saw that confirmed. ^{29}The only thing I found was this: the human is made righteous by God, but again it always chooses the wrong ways.

== Reception ==
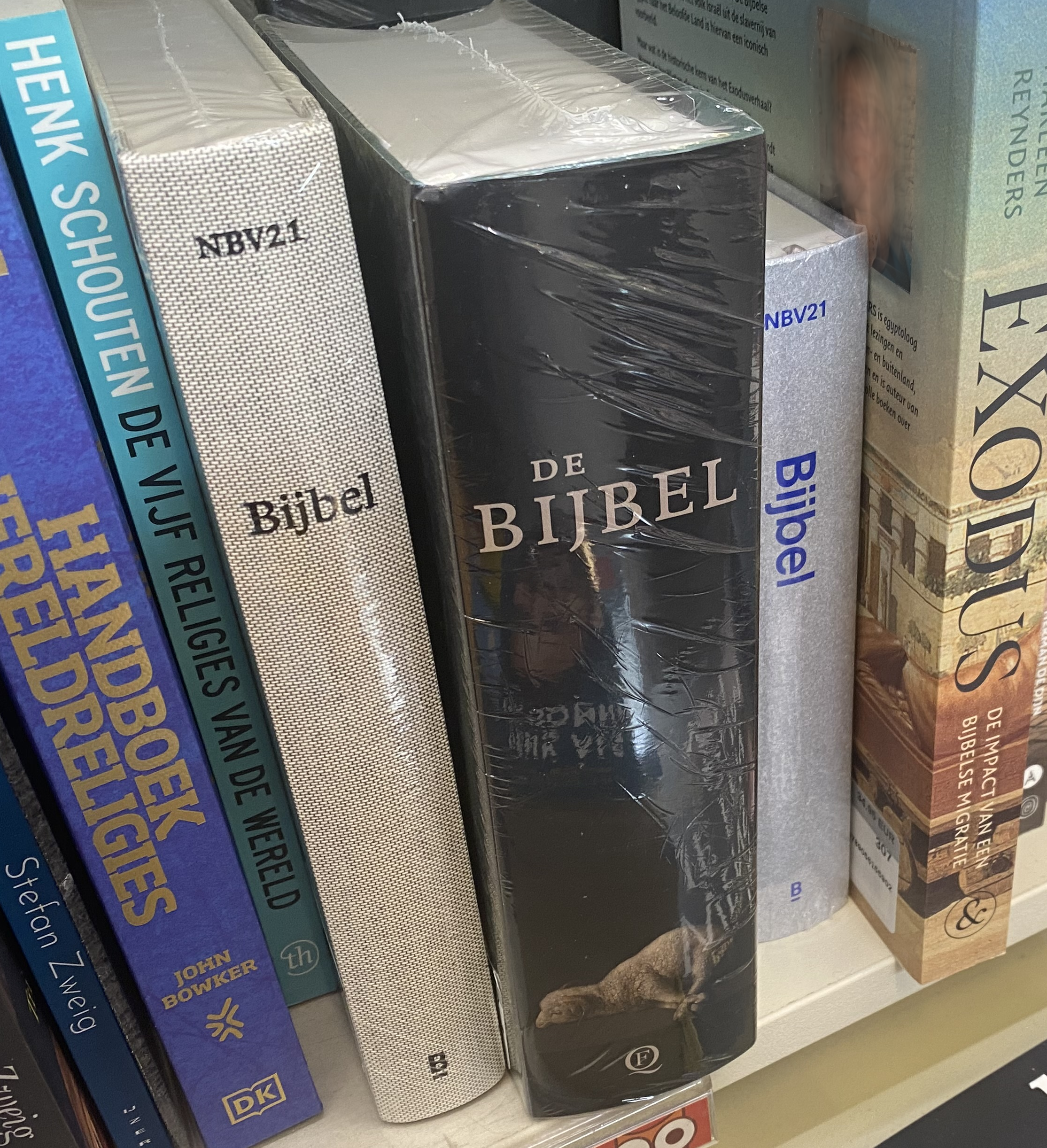
Different editions of the NBV21 (left to right): Standard edition, Literary edition, Youth edition.

On 10 March 2022, the foundation The Best Dutch Book Designs (Dutch: De Best Verzorgde Boeken) announced the standard edition of the NBV21 as one of the 32 most well-designed books of the Netherlands in 2021. New Testament scholar Barend Drews suggested the translation could be improved both on the fields of concordance and distinction between the attributes of text and of language, but supported its use in Protestant liturgy. Even after the release of the NBV21, Catholic churches continued to use the Willibrord translation for Dutch-language liturgy. In an open letter to the NBG, the European Society of Women in Theological Research, Nederland and the Dutch Ecumenical Women's Synod criticized the use of reverential capitalization in the NBV21, stating that it strengthened a patriarchal image of God.

== Editions ==
The following is a list of editions of the NBV21 which significantly vary in textual content and have been sanctioned by the Dutch-Flemish Bible Society.

Title	Date	Description	Publisher	ISBN	Reference(s)
NBV21 Standaardeditie; DC: (Note: The abbreviation 'DC' indicates a different version of the same edition which specifically includes the Deuterocanon.) NBV21 Standaardeditie met deuterocanonieke boeken	13 October 2021; DC: 20 October 2021	Standard edition.	Nederlands-Vlaams Bijbelgenootschap	9789089124005; DC: 9789089124012	
NBV21 Kunsteditie	October 2021	Illustrated edition with DC and illustrations of Flemish and Dutch paintings from the Renaissance and Dutch Golden Age.	Athenaeum	9789025313630	
NBV21 Literaire editie	October 2021	Literary edition with DC, a glossary, and introductions by various Biblical scholars.	Querido	9789021428758	
NBV21 Jongereneditie; DC: NBV21 Jongereneditie met deuterocanonieke boeken	3 May 2022; DC: 10 May 2022	Youth edition with background information to render the Bible accessible for youths.	Nederlands-Vlaams Bijbelgenootschap	9789089124210; DC: 9789089124227	
Bijbel met bijdragen over geloof, cultuur en wetenschap (or the Wetenschapsbijbel)	8 November 2022	Exegetical edition with annotations from theologians, philosophers, and natural scientists.	NBG	9789089124128	
NBV21 Jongerenbijbel	1 June 2024	Youth edition with thematic directions, biographies, and elaboration on Biblical themes from an ecumenical team of authors.	Nederlands-Vlaams Bijbelgenootschap	9789089124333	

== See also ==
- Bible translations into Dutch
