= Renaissance in the Low Countries =

Cultural period

The Renaissance in the Low Countries was a cultural period in the Northern Renaissance that took place in around the 16th century in the Low Countries (corresponding to modern-day Belgium, the Netherlands and French Flanders).

Culture in the Low Countries at the end of the 15th century was influenced by the Italian Renaissance, through trade via Bruges, which made Flanders wealthy. Its nobles commissioned artists who became known across Europe. In science, the anatomist Andreas Vesalius led the way; in cartography, Gerardus Mercator's map assisted explorers and navigators. In art, Dutch and Flemish Renaissance painting went from the strange work of Hieronymus Bosch to the everyday life of Pieter Brueghel the Elder. In architecture, music and literature too, the culture of the Low Countries moved into the Renaissance style.

== Geopolitical situation and background ==
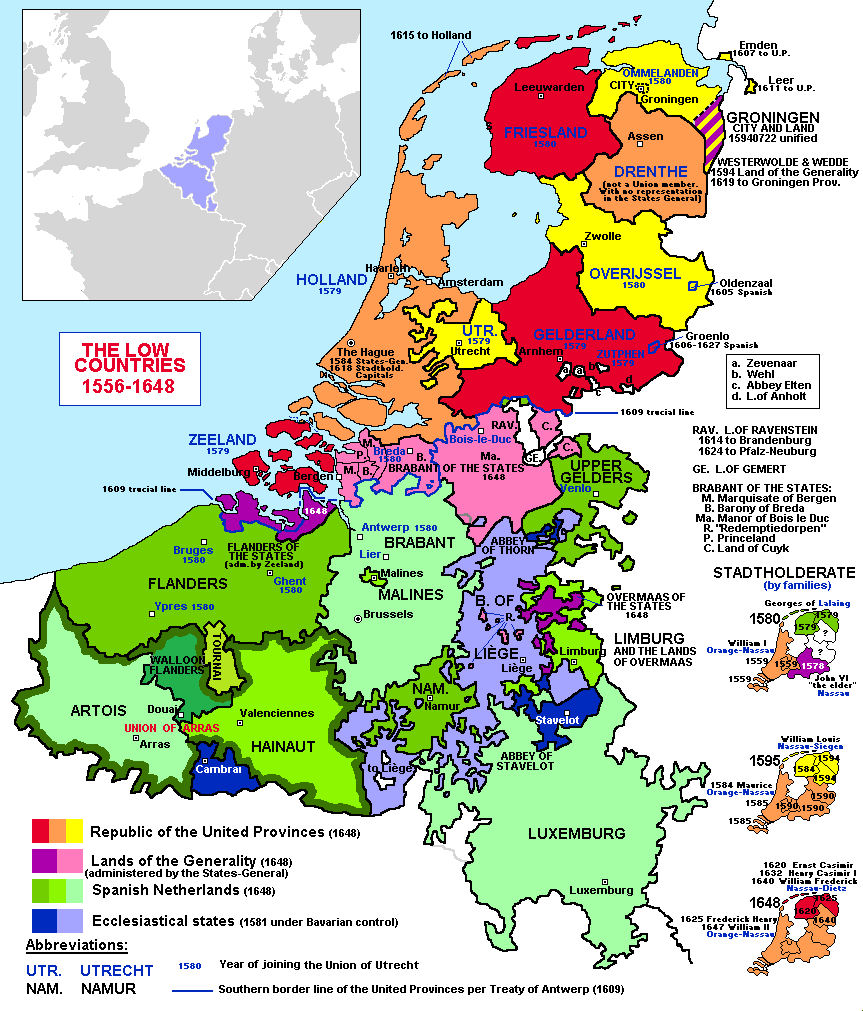
Map showing the political situation in the Low Countries between 1556 and 1648.

In 1500, the Seventeen Provinces were in a personal union under the Burgundian Dukes, and with the Flemish cities as centers of gravity, culturally and economically formed one of the richest parts of Europe. During the course of the century the region also experienced significant changes. Humanism and Reformation led to a rebellion against the Spanish rule of Philip II of Spain and the start of the religious war. By the end of the 16th century the Northern and Southern Netherlands were effectively split. While this fracture was reflected in the visual arts by the Dutch Golden Age in the north and the Flemish Baroque in the south, other areas of thought remained associated with 16th-century currents of Renaissance thought. Gradually, the balance of power shifted away from the Southern Netherlands, which remained under Spanish authority, to the emerging Dutch Republic.

Two factors determined the fate of the region in the 16th century. The first was the union with the kingdom of Spain through the 1496 marriage of Philip the Handsome of Burgundy and Juana of Castile. Their son, Charles V, born in Ghent, would inherit the largest empire in the world, and the Netherlands, although a prominent part of the empire, became dependent on a large foreign power.

A second factor included religious developments. The Middle Ages gave way to new modes of religious thinking. Devotio Moderna practices, for example, were particularly strong in the region, while the 16th-century criticisms of the Catholic Church that spread throughout Europe also reached the Low Countries. Humanists such as Desiderius Erasmus of Rotterdam were critical but remained loyal to the church. However, the spread of the Protestant Reformation, started by Martin Luther in 1517, eventually led to outright war. The Reformation, particularly the ideas of John Calvin, gained significant support in the Low Countries, and following the 1566 iconoclastic outbreaks Spain attempted to quell the tide and maintain the authority of the post-Tridentine Church through force by installing Fernando Álvarez de Toledo, Duke of Alba. The repression that followed led to the Dutch Revolt, the beginning of the Eighty Years War, and the establishment of the Dutch Republic in the northern provinces. Subsequently, the Southern Netherlands became a bastion for the Counter Reformation, while Calvinism was the main religion of those in power in the Dutch Republic.

=== Influence of the Italian Renaissance ===
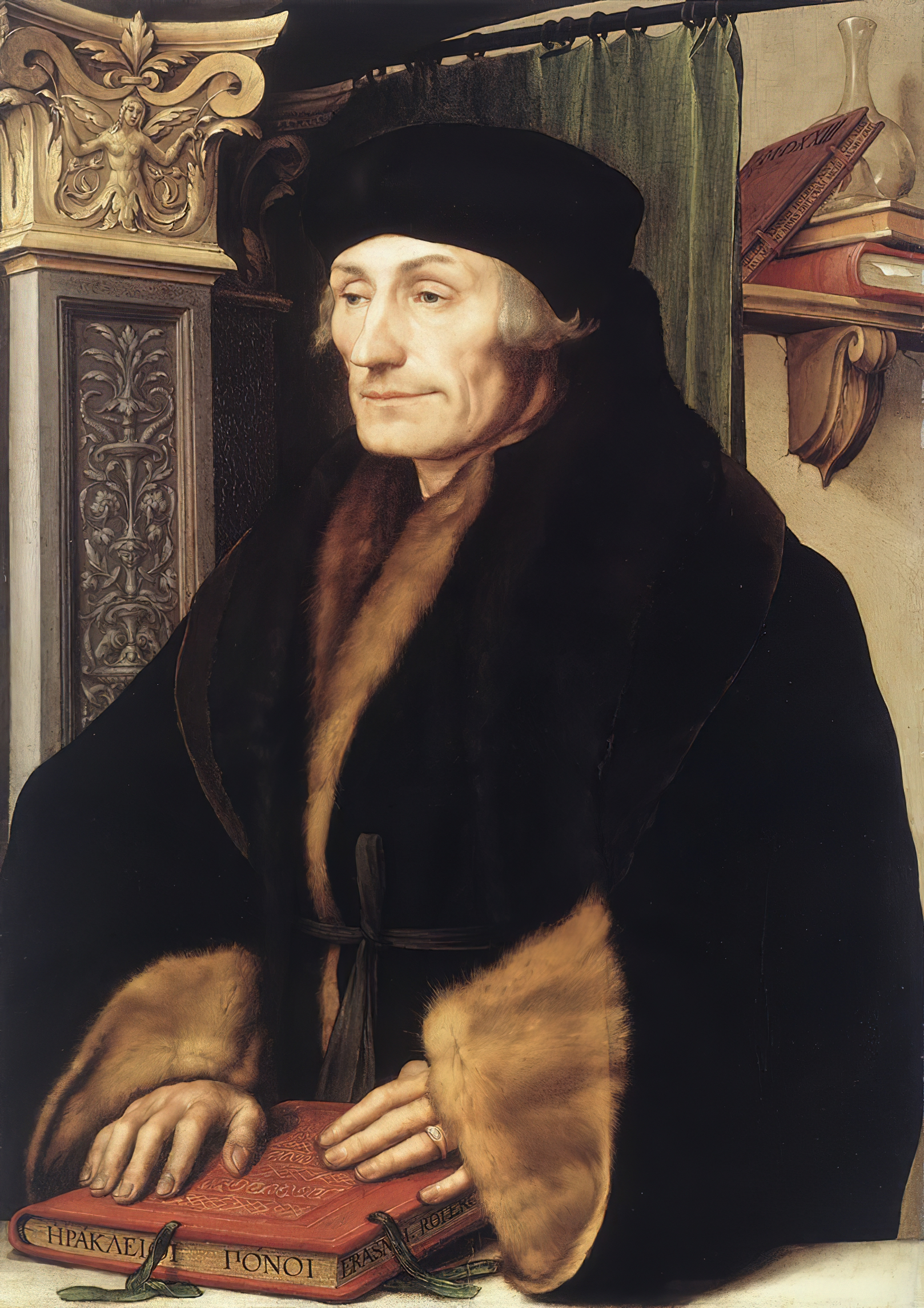
Desiderius Erasmus in 1523

Trade in the port of Bruges and the textile industry, mostly in Ghent, turned Flanders into the wealthiest part of Northern Europe at the end of the 15th century. The Burgundian court dwelled mostly in Bruges, Ghent and Brussels. The nobles and rich traders were able to commission artists, creating a class of highly skilled painters and musicians who were admired and requested around the continent.

This led to frequent exchanges between the Low Countries and Northern Italy. Examples are Italian architects Tommaso Vincidor and Alessandro Pasqualini, who worked in the Low Countries for most of their careers, Flemish painter Jan Gossaert, whose visit to Italy in 1508 in the company of Philip of Burgundy left a deep impression, musician Adrian Willaert who made Venice into the most important musical centre of its time (see Venetian School) and Giambologna, a Flemish sculptor who spent his most productive years in Florence.

Before 1500, the Italian Renaissance had little or no influence above the Alps. After this Renaissance influences moved northward, but unlike the Italian Renaissance, Gothic elements remained important. The revival of the classical period is also not a central theme like in Italy, the "rebirth" shows itself more as a return to nature and earthly beauty.

== Renaissance in the Low Countries ==
=== Art ===
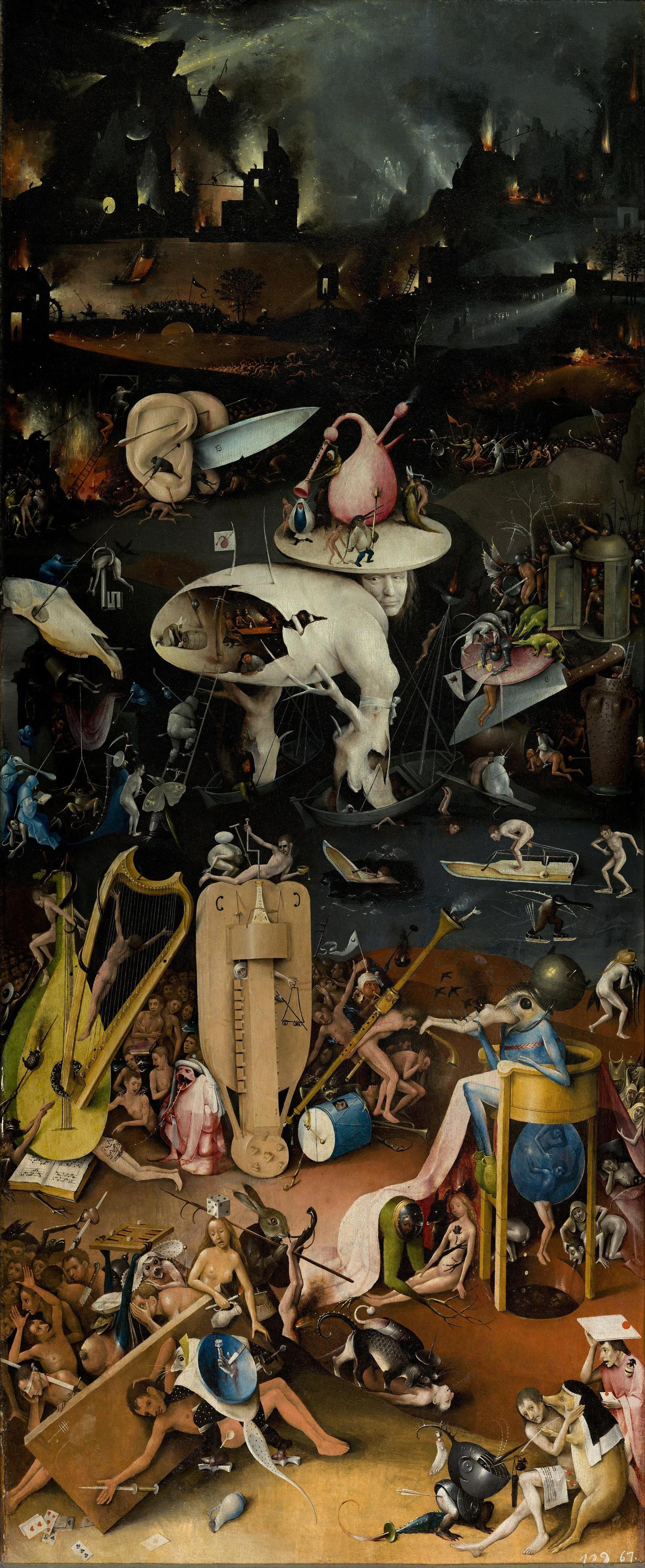
Hell, the right panel from the triptych The Garden of Earthly Delights by Hieronymus Bosch

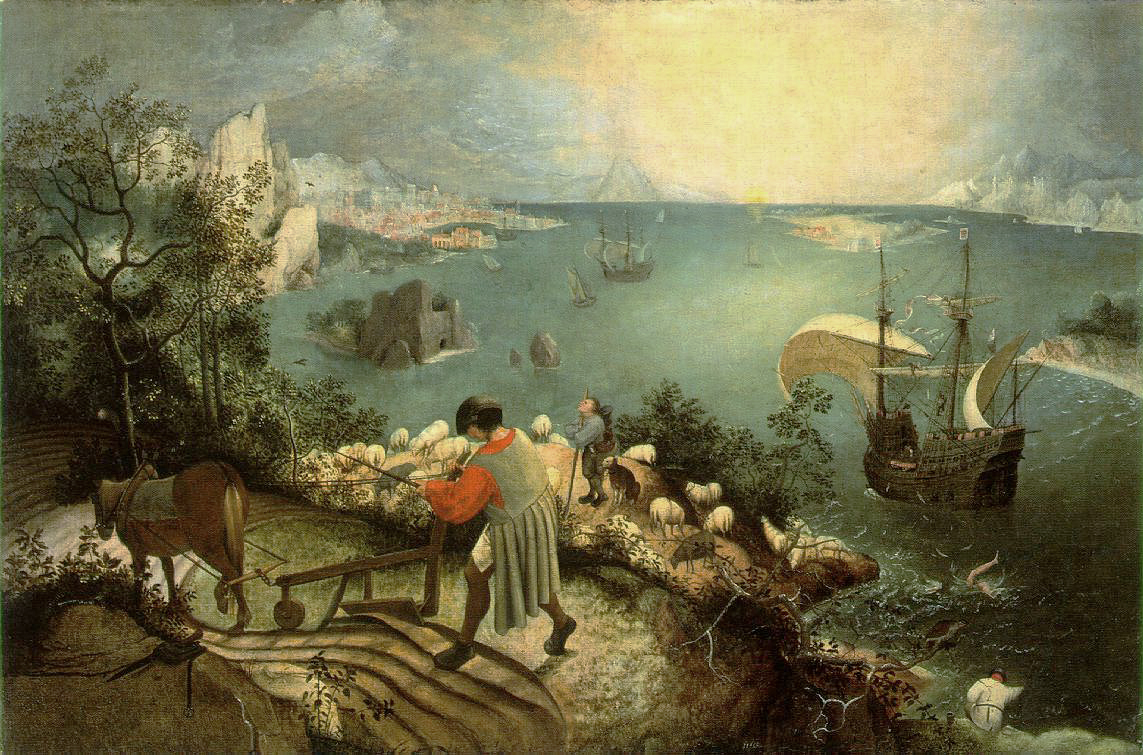
Landscape with the Fall of Icarus after Pieter Bruegel the Elder

Fifteenth-century painting in the Low Countries still shows strong religious influences, contrary to the Germanic painting. Even after 1500, when Renaissance influences begin to show, the influence of the masters from the previous century leads to a largely religious and narrative style of painting.

The first painter showing the marks of the new era is Hieronymus Bosch. His work is strange and full of seemingly irrational imagery, making it difficult to interpret. Most of all it seems surprisingly modern, introducing a world of dreams that highly contrasts with the traditional style of the Flemish masters of his day.

After 1550, the Flemish and Dutch painters begin to show more interest in nature and in beauty an sich, leading to a style that incorporates Renaissance elements, but remains very far from the elegant lightness of Italian Renaissance art, and directly leads to the themes of the great Flemish and Dutch Baroque painters: landscapes, still lifes and genre painting – scenes from everyday life.

This evolution is seen in the works of Joachim Patinir and Pieter Aertsen, but the true genius among these painters was Pieter Brueghel the Elder, well known for his depictions of nature and everyday life, showing a preference for the natural condition of man, choosing to depict the peasant instead of the prince.

The Landscape with the Fall of Icarus, now thought to be an early copy, combines several elements of northern Renaissance painting. It hints at the renewed interest for antiquity (the Icarus legend), but the hero Icarus is hidden away in the background. The main actors in the painting are nature itself and, most prominently, the peasant, who does not even look up from his plough when Icarus falls. Brueghel shows man as an anti-hero, comical and sometimes grotesque.

=== Architecture and sculpture ===
As in painting, Renaissance architecture took some time to reach the Low Countries, and did not entirely supplant Gothic elements. The most important sculptor in the Southern Netherlands was Giambologna, who spent most of his career in Italy. An architect directly influenced by the Italian masters was Cornelis Floris de Vriendt, who designed the city hall of Antwerp, finished in 1564.

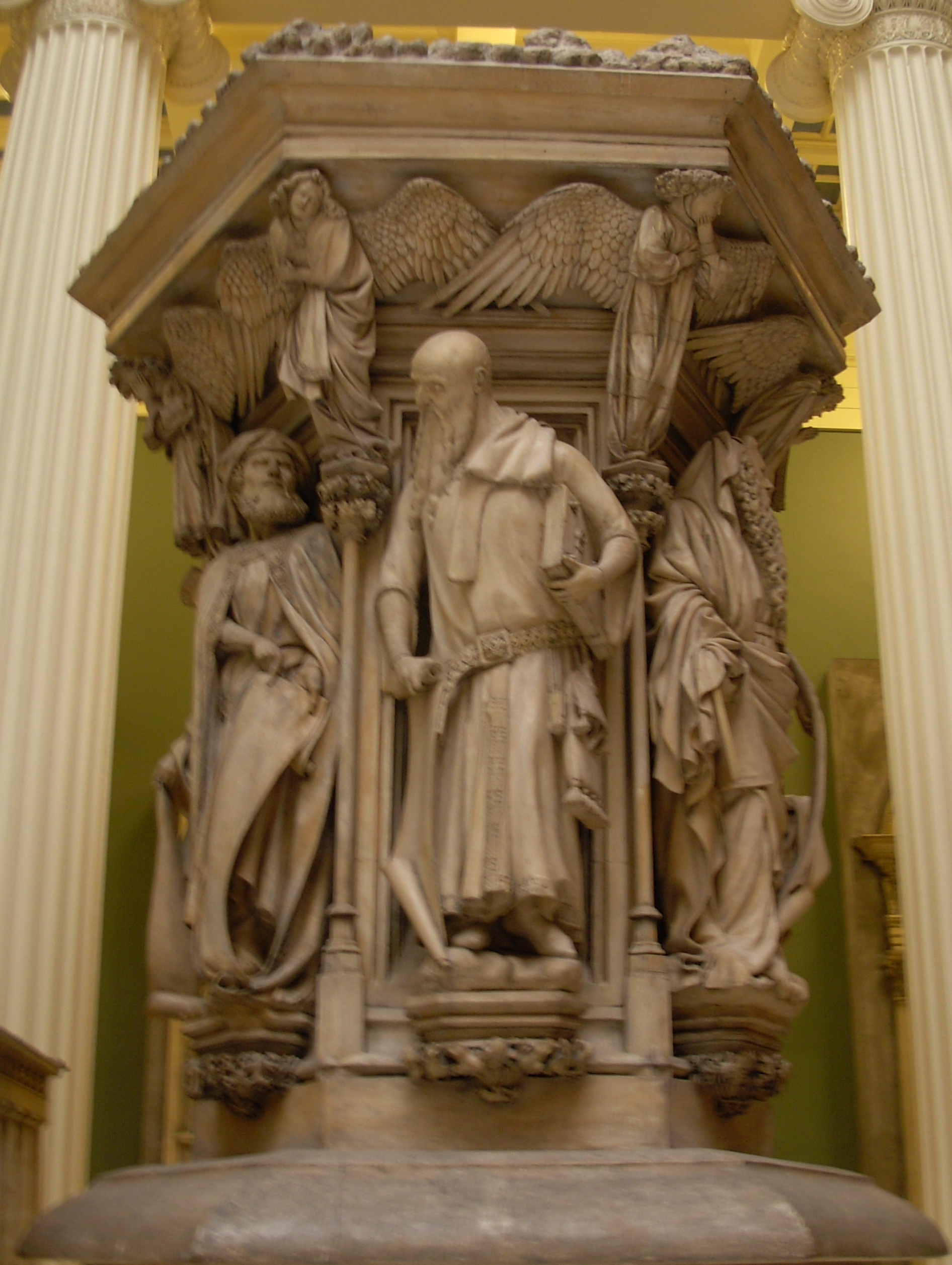
Sluter, The Well of Moses, 1395-1405

In sculpture, however, 15th-century Netherlandish artists, while adhering to Christian subjects, developed techniques and a naturalistic style which compares favorably to the work of early-Renaissance Italian contemporaries such as Donatello. Claus Sluter (fl. ~1400) produced works such as the Well of Moses with a dynamism almost unknown at the turn of the 15th century; and Dutch-born Nikolaus Gerhaert van Leyden (b. ~1420) made sculptures such as "Man Meditating", which even today appear more "modern" than does Italian Quattrocento carving.

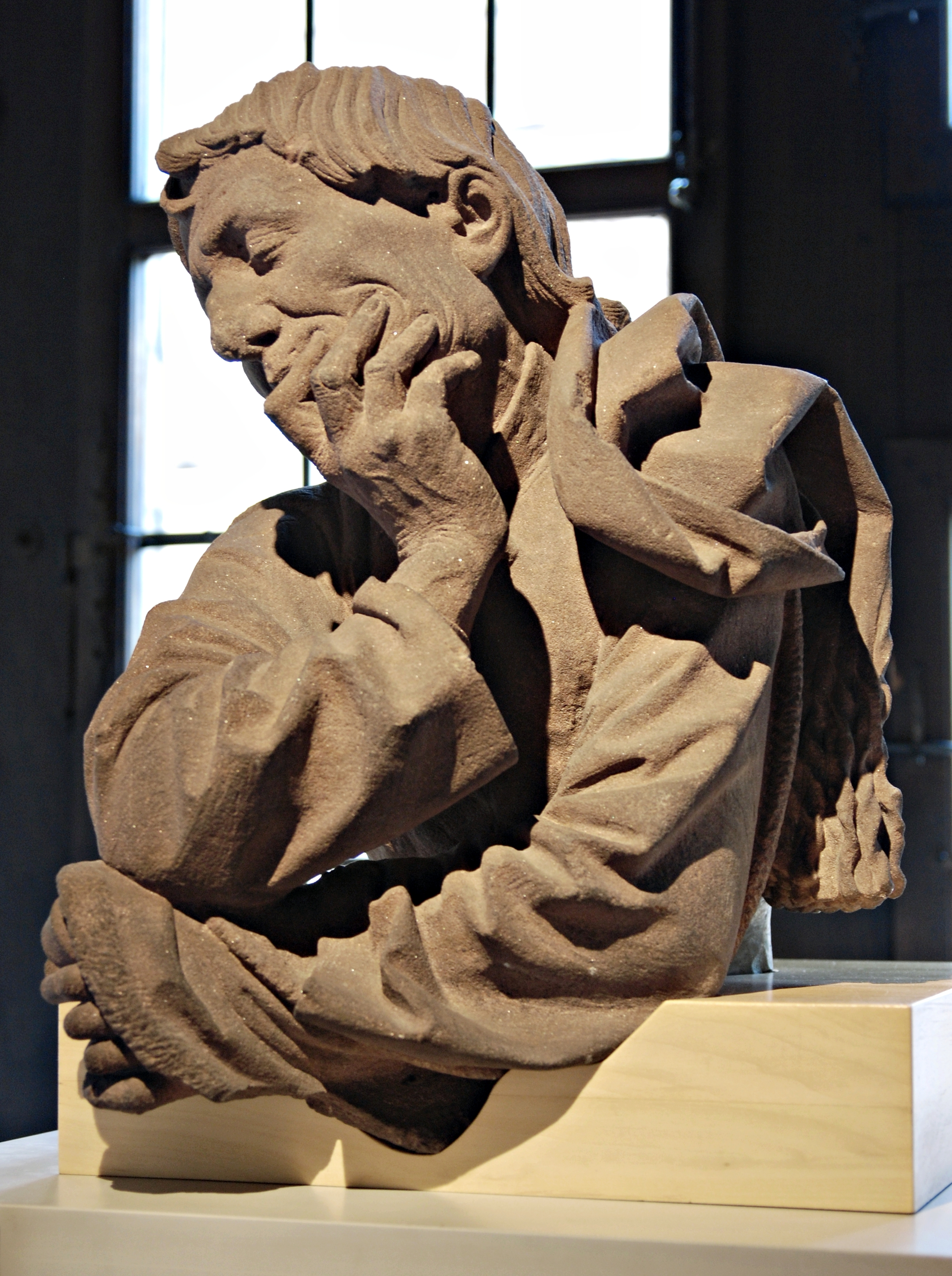
Gerhaert, Man Meditating, 1467

In the early-17th century Dutch Republic, Hendrick de Keyser plays an important role in developing the Amsterdam Renaissance style, not slavishly following the classical style but incorporating many decorative elements, giving a result that could also be categorized as Mannerism. Hans Vredeman de Vries was another important name, primarily as a garden architect.

=== Music ===
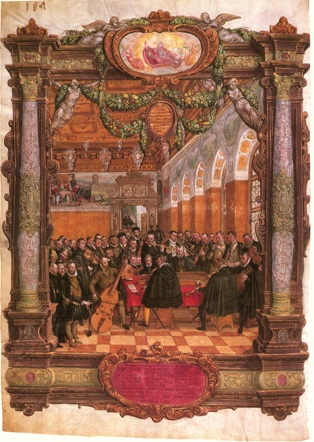
Orlande de Lassus leading a chamber ensemble, painted by Hans Mielich

Although there is no reference to antiquity, there is a clear Flemish "Renaissance consciousness", as indicated by the words of Flemish theorist Johannes Tinctoris, who said of these Franco-Flemish composers: "Although it is beyond belief, nothing worth listening to had been composed before their time".

Josquin des Prez was the most celebrated composer during the High Renaissance, and during his career enjoyed the patronage of three popes. Equally at ease in secular and religious music.

Other important composers from the Low Countries were Guillaume Dufay, Johannes Ockeghem, Jacob Clemens non Papa and Adrian Willaert. Orlande de Lassus, a Fleming who had lived in Italy as a youth and spent most of his career in Munich, was the leading composer of the late Renaissance.

=== Literature ===
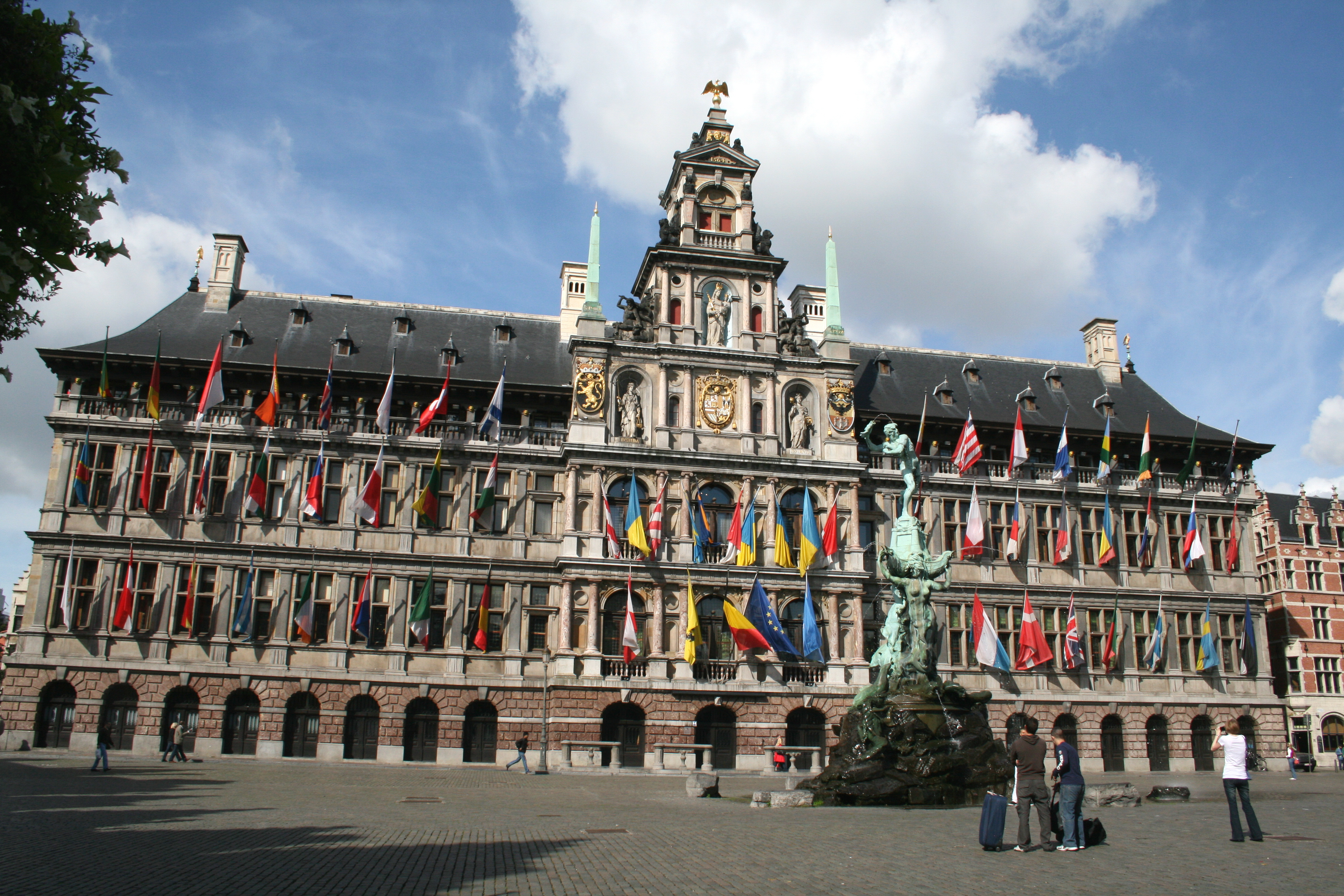
Antwerp City Hall (finished in 1564)

In the middle of the 16th century, a group of rhetoricians (see Medieval Dutch literature) in Brabant and Flanders attempted to put new life into the stereotyped forms of the preceding age by introducing in original composition the new-found branches of Latin and Greek poetry. The leader of these men was Johan Baptista Houwaert, who was led by an unbounded love of classical and mythological fancy.

The most important genre was music publishing, especially psalms. The Souterliedekens publication is one of the most important sources for the reconstruction of Renaissance folksongs. Later publishing was heavily influenced by the rebellion against the Spanish: heroic battle songs and political ballads ridiculing the Spanish occupants.

Best remembered of the writers is Philips van Marnix, lord of Sint-Aldegonde, who was one of the leading spirits in the war of Dutch independence. He wrote a satire on the Roman Catholic Church, started to work on a Bible translation and allegedly wrote the lyrics to the Dutch national anthem.

Other important names are Dirck Volckertszoon Coornhert, Hendrick Laurensz. Spieghel and Roemer Visscher. Inevitably, their works and career were very much determined by the struggle between Reformation and the Catholic Church.

=== Science ===
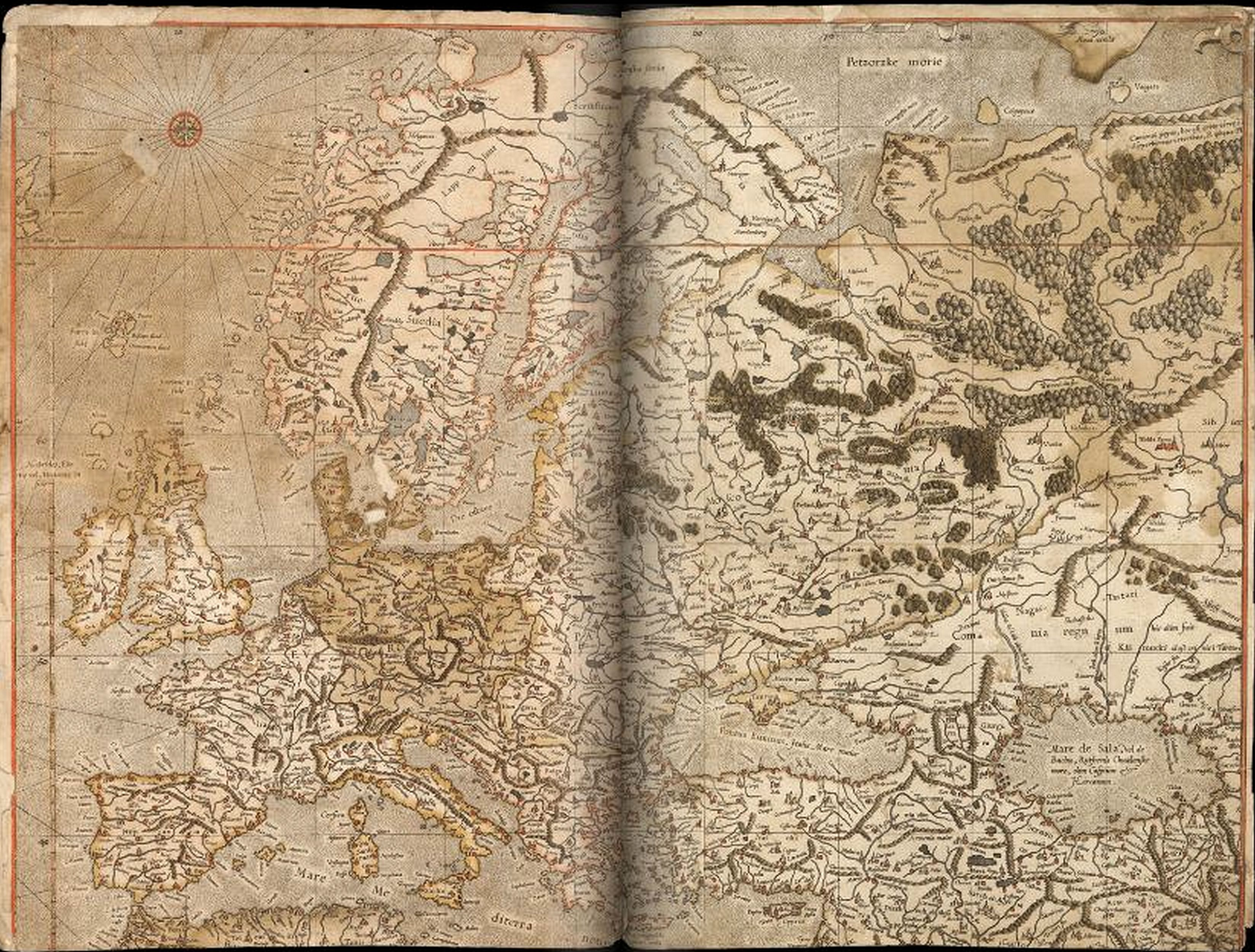
Gerardus Mercator's map of Europe, 1554

The new age presents itself in science as well. Flemish anatomist Andreas Vesalius's life typically shows both the new possibilities and the troubles that came with them. He delivered ground-breaking work on human anatomy, after centuries of disregard for it. This earned him great respect from some, but also caused several enquiries into his methods (dissection of the human body) and the religious implications of his work.

While Vesalius performed ground-breaking work in rediscovering the human body, Gerardus Mercator, as one of the leading cartographers of his time, did the same for rediscovering the outside world. Mercator too came into trouble with the Church because of his beliefs, and spent several months in jail after a conviction for heresy.

Both scientists' lives show how the Renaissance scientist is not afraid of challenging what has been taken for granted for centuries, and how this leads to problems with the all-powerful Catholic Church.

Though the invention of the printing press by Laurens Janszoon Coster in the 1430s appears to be a romantic notion, the Low Countries had an early start in printing. By 1470 a printing press was in use in Utrecht, where the first dated extant book was printed in 1473, while the first book in the Dutch language was the 1477 Delft Bible. By 1481 the Low Countries had printing shops in 21 cities and towns. Famous publishing houses like those of Christoffel Plantijn in Antwerp from 1555 on, Petrus Phalesius the Elder in Leuven from 1553, and the House of Elzevir in Leiden from around 1580 turned the Low Countries into a regional center of publishing.

== See also ==
- English Renaissance
- French Renaissance
- German Renaissance

=== Political situation ===
- Burgundian Netherlands
- Seventeen Provinces
- Dutch Republic – Dutch Golden Age
- Eighty Years' War

=== Arts ===
- Flemish painting
- Romanism (painting)
- List of Flemish painters
- List of Dutch painters
