= Pieter Datheen =

Dutch Calvinist theologian

Chaplain to Elector Frederick III
- In office 1567–1578

Member of the Revolutionary Council of Ghent
- In office December 1577 – August 1579

Personal life
- Born: 1531 Cassel, Nord, France
- Died: March 17, 1588 Elbing, Poland
- Buried: St. Nicholas Cathedral, Elbląg
- Spouse: Benedicta
- Children: Christiana Datheen
- Parent: Pieter Datheen (father)
- Era: Early Modern
- Notable work: De Psalmen Davids (Dutch Psalter)

Religious life
- Religion: Christianity
- Denomination: Reformed; Dutch Reformed
- Church: Roman Catholic, (ca. 1545-1550); Dutch Refugee Church in London, (1550-1553); Dutch Refugee Church in Frankfurt, (1555-1561); Frankenthal Reformed Church, (1562-1566); Nederduitse Gereformeerde Kerk, (1566-1588)
- Profession: Dutch Reformed Minister; Chaplain; Liturgist; Translator; Physician
- Ordination: July 5, 1840

Pieter Datheen, Latin Petrus Dathenus, English, Peter Datheen, (Cassel, Nord, c.1531 - Elbing, 17 March 1588) was a Dutch Calvinist theologian, the 16th century reformer of The Netherlands, who accomplished many things for the advancement the Reformed Church liturgy and ecclesiastical polity.

First, he translated the Heidelberg Catechism into Dutch. Second, using the singing work of John Calvin, Theodore Beza, Peter Marot, and Louis Bourgeois, Datheen set the Psalms and psalter to verse and tune in Dutch (1566), though his settings were overshadowed by those of Philips Marnix van St Aldegonde. Third, he translated the famous "Form for the Administration of Holy Baptism" from Heidelberg with its very orthodox emphasis on the Covenant of Grace containing two parts. Fourth, he translated the equally famous "Form for the Administration of the Lord's Supper," also from the Palatinate, still used by orthodox Reformed churches today. Fifth, he was President of the Convent of Wesel in 1568, which expressed hope for the Reformed Churches to be free from the awful persecution of Spanish Roman Catholics, and more significantly President of the 1578 Synod of Dordt, which, among its significant decisions, also paved the way for the Statenvertaling. Sixth, at this latter Synod he helped write, edit, and approve the long-revered Church Order (more famously known as the 1618-1619 Church Order of Dordt) with its 84 articles. Seventh, he developed the liturgy (order of worship) used by orthodox Dutch and American Reformed Churches with the singing, alms, prayer, and preaching at the required places. Eighth and finally, during Roman Catholic Spain's persecution of "heretics" in the Lowlands region, resulting in the deaths of many Reformed Christians, Datheen was a field preacher carrying his pulpit on his back and then orating to crowds of 15,000 in a blunt eloquence that was intense and captivating.

Datheen held strong views on making sure to avoid all compromise with Roman Catholic guided countries, like Spain, put him at great odds with Prince William the Silent (of Orange) and led to Datheen's multiple political ostracizations from his fatherland. Datheen was one of the Calvinist preachers who supported Jan van Hembyse, the popular leader of the Calvinist Republic of Ghent, in 1577 and 1578, in the most radical phase of that regime.

Peter Datheen married a former Roman Catholic nun, Benedicta. Together they had one daughter, Christiana.

Recent research based on stylometry mentioned him as a possible author of the text of the Dutch national anthem Wilhelmus. Dutch and Flemish researchers (Meertens Institute, Utrecht University and University of Antwerp) discovered by chance a striking number of similarities between his style and the style of the national anthem.
