= Convent of Wesel =

Wesel Convention Controversial influential (1568)

The Wesel Convention was a secret gathering of leading church people from Dutch refugee communities, believed to have taken place in November 1568 in the Hanseatic city of Wesel. While there have been questions about the date and place of this Convention, decisions taken around that time are still influential for the church order of Reformed churches in the Netherlands. These decisions also led to the introduction of the presbyterial-synodal structures of affiliated churches, first in the duchies of Jülich-Kleve-Berg, and later in all German provincial churches. Recent research, however, has disputed whether this specific gathering occurred at all, or if it took place in a different year and location.

== Background ==
Both Martin Luther and John Calvin were active during the Reformation in the Dutch provinces, a populous and economically important territory. Starting in 1567, the Duke of Alba, governor of the Netherlands on behalf of Habsburg emperor, King Philip II of Spain, brutally suppressed Calvinism and the initial Dutch Revolt. This action triggered the Eighty Years' War (1568–1648), which eventually resulted in the independence of the United Netherlands.

In the course of the clashes between the Spanish Habsburgs and the Netherlands, many Dutch left their homes (probably more than 100,000). Especially from 1568 to 1572 there was a large wave of refugees. The refugees found refuge in the Lower Rhine, in the Palatinate, in East Friesland, and in England. At their respective asylum sites, they gathered in their own Reformed refugee communities. The aim of the Wesel Convention of 1568 was to give these communities a uniform presbyterial structure and to network them through a synodal superstructure. Wesel as a venue had taken a variety of Dutch religious refugees, which was reflected in the later received honorary name "Vesalia hospitalis" ("hospitable Wesel").

== Course and decisions ==
At the beginning of November 1568, 43 leading figures of the Dutch exiles met in Wesel to discuss a church order for the Dutch communities. While most of the people were theological figures and elders, there were also some important figures of the political opposition in attendance. Statements about the exact course of the meeting are not possible because sources are missing. The minutes of the meeting, dated 3 November 1568, have been preserved. The recommendations for a church order documented there refer, on the one hand, to the life of the individual parishes, and, on the other hand, describe the nature of their networking through a two-stage system of synods.

== The individual community ==
The life of the individual church is described by four ministries to be filled in the church: preacher, elder, deacon and teacher or "prophet." The preacher has the task of proclamation. The elders run the church together with the preacher. Together they form the consistory ("presbytery"). The deacon is responsible for care of the poor, while the teacher or "prophet" (this office is not clearly profiled in the resolutions) has the task of theological training of the community. With this appointment, the Wesel Convention takes on the four-ward teaching of Calvin.

== The synodal superstructure ==
For the networking of the communities, the Convention decided on a two-stage synodal "superstructure." At the local level, individual congregations send emissaries to the Classical Synod (e.g., the Classical Synod Wesel, which includes the territory of the then Duchy of Cleves). These classical synods in turn send delegates to the general synod ("provincial synod"). With this church construction, the Wesel Convention adopted the Church discipline (discipline ecclésiastique) of the French Huguenot Church of 1559.

== Effect ==
=== In Dutch communities ===
The decisions of Wesel were implemented directly in the Dutch refugee communities. Four classes were formed: Pfalz, Jülich, Ostfriesland and Wesel. In 1571, the Synod of Emden confirmed the decisions of Wesel in all essential respects and transformed them into a church order. However, the office of the teacher or "prophet," which was not clearly profiled in Wesel, was no longer mentioned, and the election of preachers and elders in the form of collegial electoral bodies of neighboring communities was abandoned in favor of direct election by the individual community. After the return of many refugees to the Netherlands in 1578, the entire synod met for the first time in Dordrecht, Netherlands.

The church organization established in Wesel was thus realized on all three levels (community, class, synod). This presbyterial-synodal church structure continues to shape the Reformed churches in the Netherlands to this day.

=== In the German church system ===
The Wesel Convention was a gathering of Dutch church leaders. Nevertheless, these decisions and their implementation in the Dutch refugee communities have had a significant impact on German communities in Jülich-Kleve-Berg-Mark, especially the Reformation communities on the Lower Rhine. The power of presbyter-synodal church order was so strong that within a few years this system was used in a number of German communities. Presbyteries (consistories) were used as governing bodies, joining the German and Dutch systems together.

In 1610, the German communities established their own synod in Duisburg and thus broke away from the Dutch church organization. However, the structure adopted at the Wesel Convention and in Emden was retained. In 1653, a synod in Kleve confirmed the church order using the Weseler model. In order to obtain state recognition, the Wesel system was only applied unofficially. However, after the Congress of Vienna, the Prussian King Friedrich Wilhelm III granted official recognition for the Wesel system in the Rhine Province and the Province of Westphalia ("Rhenish-Westphalian Church Order of 1835").

In the 19th century, many Protestant state churches used the Rhenish-Westphalian church order as a model. The presbyterial-synodal system prevailed completely after the abolition of the sovereign church regiment (1918), so that today European churches and national churches use parishes of presbyteries (church councils and church councils, partly supplemented by episcopal leadership structures) with a multi-level synodal structure.

Thus, the resolutions of the Wesel Convention of 1568 not influenced the Dutch Reformed Church, but also the Evangelical Church in Germany, most particularly the Evangelical Church of Westphalia and the Protestant Church in the Rhineland, as well as the Evangelical Reformed Church and the Lippe Regional Church.

== Research and controversy ==
In 1982, Jan Pieter van Dooren launched a discussion on whether the secret Wesel Convention really took place in Wesel in 1568. Van Dooren postulated that the convention had taken place in Antwerp in late 1566 or early 1567. His theory was that the documents included a wrong place and time as a precautionary measure. This theory was based on work by Walter Stampel. The theory was later modified by Owe Boersma, which led Herbert Kipp to state that the place mentioned in the protocol (Wesel) and the time (November 1568) make this seem plausible.

In 2004, Jesse A. Spohnholz suggested that the initiative and organization of the Wesel Convention were in the hands of the Consistorium of the Dutch refugee community in Wesel. Spohnholz' book The Convent of Wesel: The Event that never was and the Invention of Tradition was published in 2017 by Cambridge University Press.

== Bibliography ==
=== Resolutions of the Wesel Convention ===
JF Gerhard Goeters (ed.): The decisions of the Wesel Convention of 1568 (series of publications of the Association for Rhenish Church History 30). Press Association of the Protestant Church in the Rhineland, Düsseldorf 1968.

=== Secondary literature ===
- Jan Pieter van Dooren: The Wesel Convention 1568. New research results . In: Monatshefte for Protestant church history in the Rhineland 31 (1982), pp 41–55.
- Herbert Frost: The Convent of Wesel in 1568 and its influence on the emergence of a German Protestant constitutional constitution . In: Ders .: Selected writings on state and church law, ed. v. Manfred Baldus et al. (= Jus Ecclesiasticum 65 ) Tübingen 2001, pp. 65–115. ISBN 3-16-147396-5 .
- Johann F. Gerhard Goeters : The Wesel Convention of Dutch Refugees of 3 November 1568 . In: Weseler Convention 1568-1968: A jubilee writing (= series of publications of the Association for Rhenish Church History 29 ). Press Association of the Protestant Church in the Rhineland, Düsseldorf 1968, pp. 88–114.
- Wilhelm Maurer : On the history of the Rhenish-Westphalian church order of 1835 . In: Gerhard Mueller, Gottfried Seebaß (Hrsg.): The church and their right: Collected essays on the Protestant church right (= Jus Ecclesiasticum 23 ). Mohr Siebeck, Tübingen 1976, pp. 279–309. ISBN 3-16-637702-6 .
- Ulrich Scheuner : The decisions of the Wesel Convention in their impact on the development of the church system in Rhineland-Westphalia . In: Weseler Convention 1568-1968: A jubilee writing (= series of publications of the Association for Rhenish Church History 29 ). Press Association of the Protestant Church in the Rhineland, Düsseldorf 1968, pp. 163–191.
