= Agnus Dei (Zurbarán) =

Painting by Francisco de Zurbarán

- Lamb of God (English)
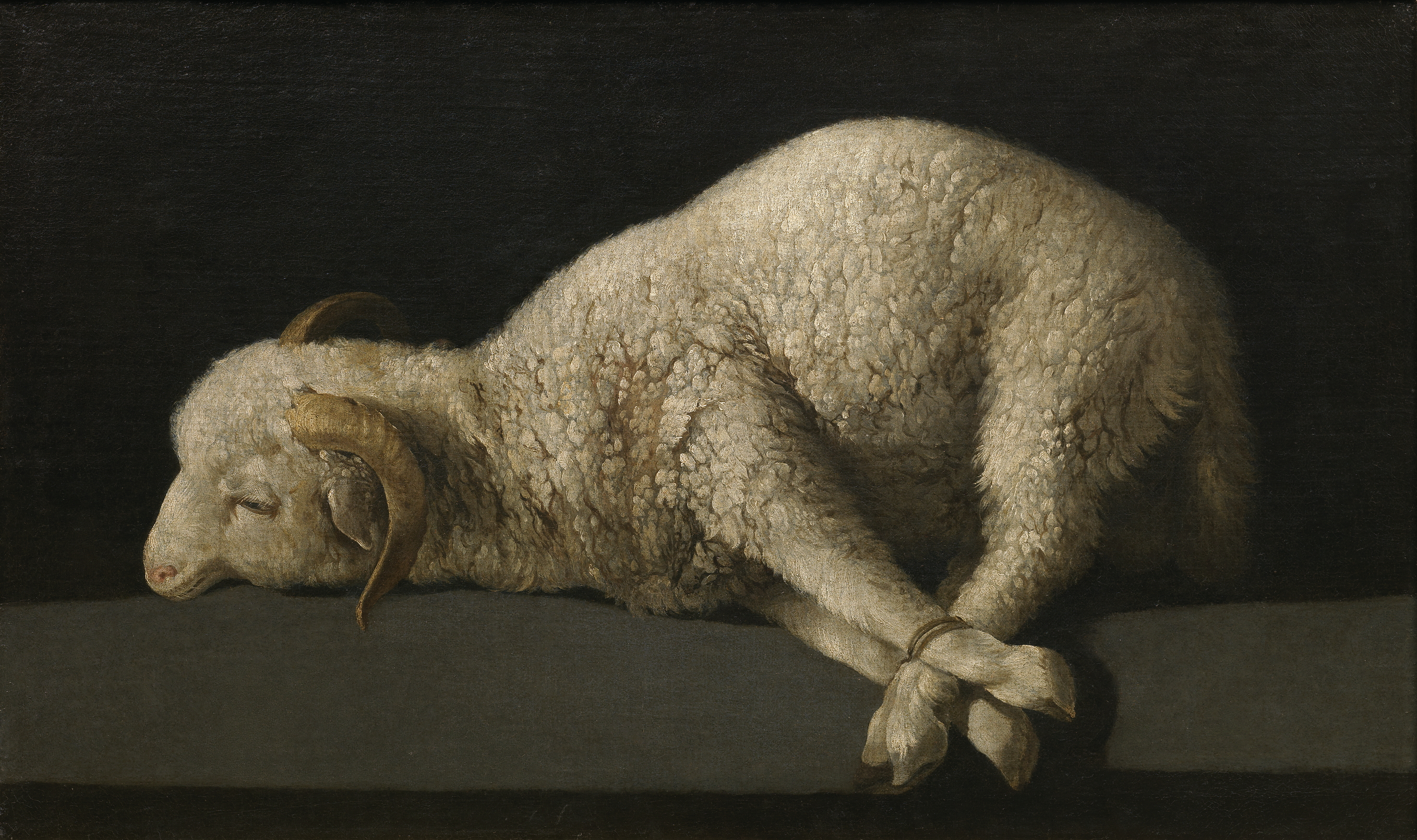
- Artist: Francisco de Zurbarán
- Completion date: c. 1635 – c. 1640
- Catalogue: P007293
- Medium: Oil on canvas
- Subject: Lamb of God
- Dimensions: 38 cm × 62 cm (15 in × 24 in)
- Location: Museo del Prado, Madrid

Agnus Dei (Latin for Lamb of God) is an oil painting completed between 1635 and 1640 by the Spanish Baroque artist Francisco de Zurbarán. It is housed in the Prado Museum in Madrid, Spain. The Lamb of God is an allusion to Christ's title as recorded in John's Gospel (John 1:29), where John the Baptist describes Jesus as "The Lamb of God who takes away the sin of the World".

== Frame versions ==
=== Agnus Dei GMG Foundation Switzerland ===
Dated and signed in 1631. It is the first of Zurbarán's dated works on this subject. With dimensions of 84 × 116 cm (centimeters). This oil is perhaps one of the least studied. Nothing seems to be known of its origin. In the registered catalog it is identified with the number 39.

=== Agnus Dei Plandiura ===
Dated and signed in 1632, the Agnus Dei Plandiura, also known as the Ram with its legs tied, is an oil painting of 60 × 83 cm (centimeters), and one of the best versions, is currently in Barcelona in the Salvadó Plandiura collection. This work became known thanks to its restoration and exhibition as a "guest work" at the Bilbao Fine Arts Museum in 2004. It is registered in the catalog under number 55.

=== Agnus Dei del Prado ===
Without date or signature, the date has been estimated between 1635 and 1640 in Zurbarán's artistic peak. It is the most successful version of the existing ones and has been exhibited in the permanent collection of the Prado Museum in Madrid since its acquisition in 1986. It is known that it belonged to Ferdinand VII due to a wax seal that is preserved on the back of it. The virtuosity of its brushstrokes, the quality and simplicity of the corkscrew curls, make it one of the most elegant and substantive works of the Spanish Baroque. It is painted in oil on canvas and measures 38 cm (centimeters) high by 62 cm wide. In the catalog it corresponds to the number 105.

=== Agnus Dei Private Collection Madrid ===
With dimensions of 37 × 58 cm (centimeters), and dated approximately between 1635 and 1640, also without signature. This small oil painting, unlike others, made from life, is a very similar repetition, even in its dimensions, to that of the Prado Museum. The historian Matías Díaz Padrón recognized this work in 1981, which is in a Private Collection in Madrid, without us knowing more about its origin. In the Catalog raisonné it was assigned the number 105 bis.

Likewise, it is estimated that it was painted between 1635 and 1640, lacking a date or signature, the latter does not cause any doubt today about the quality of the piece and its authorship for experts, thanks to the restoration carried out in 2005. and that revealed the true qualities of the work that until then it was impossible to corroborate due to very abrasive cleaning that it suffered in the past, in addition to the notorious presence of oxidized varnishes. We are facing the fifth version of the "Ram with its legs tied", which was sold by the Ansorena auction house in 1996. It is numbered 106 in the Catalog Raisonné.

=== Agnus Dei of San Diego ===
It lacks a date or signature, dated approximately from 1635 to 1640. Interesting is the version found in The San Diego Museum or Art, of smaller dimensions, this one is 35.56 × 52.07 cm (centimeters), it was bequeathed to the museum by Anne R. and Amy Putnam. It is one of the two versions in which the double character of still life and religious painting is not a perception, the nimbus on the ram's head and the inscription "TANQUAM AGNUS" (lit. 'like a lamb'). In the catalog it was assigned the number 107.

== Use in modern media ==
The painting appears in Sarah Phelps' BBC Agatha Christie "quintet", And Then There Were None, The Witness for The Prosecution, Ordeal by Innocence, The ABC Murders, and The Pale Horse. Its repeated use is to symbolise the trussed nature of the guilty character who has put himself on the path to perdition.

In 2021 the painting was used for the cover of the NBV21 Dutch Bible translation.

The 2022 novel Lapvona by Ottessa Moshfegh features and altered version of the painting, depicting a whiter lamb with no horns.

The official visualizer for the song 'milk of the madonna' by Deftones features Agnus Dei along with other paintings depicting lambs.

The board game Dominion features a ram inspired by Agnus Dei in the art for the card Sacrifice.

The 2026 tv show The Body features a copy of this painting.
