= Synod of Emden =

Religious event in Germany (1571)

The Synod of Emden was a gathering of 29 exiled Calvinist leaders (ministers and authors) who founded the Dutch Reformed Church. Held in Emden, Germany on 4 October 1571, where it established the rules and doctrines of the Dutch Reformed Church.

The synod affirmed the presbyterian character of the Reformed Church, organized churches within a geographical region into "classes", adopted the 1561 Confession of Faith (later known as the Belgic Confession), and approved use of the Heidelberg Catechism in Dutch-speaking congregations while promoting the Geneva Catechism for French-speaking churches.
