= Delft Bible =

Dutch old testament translation

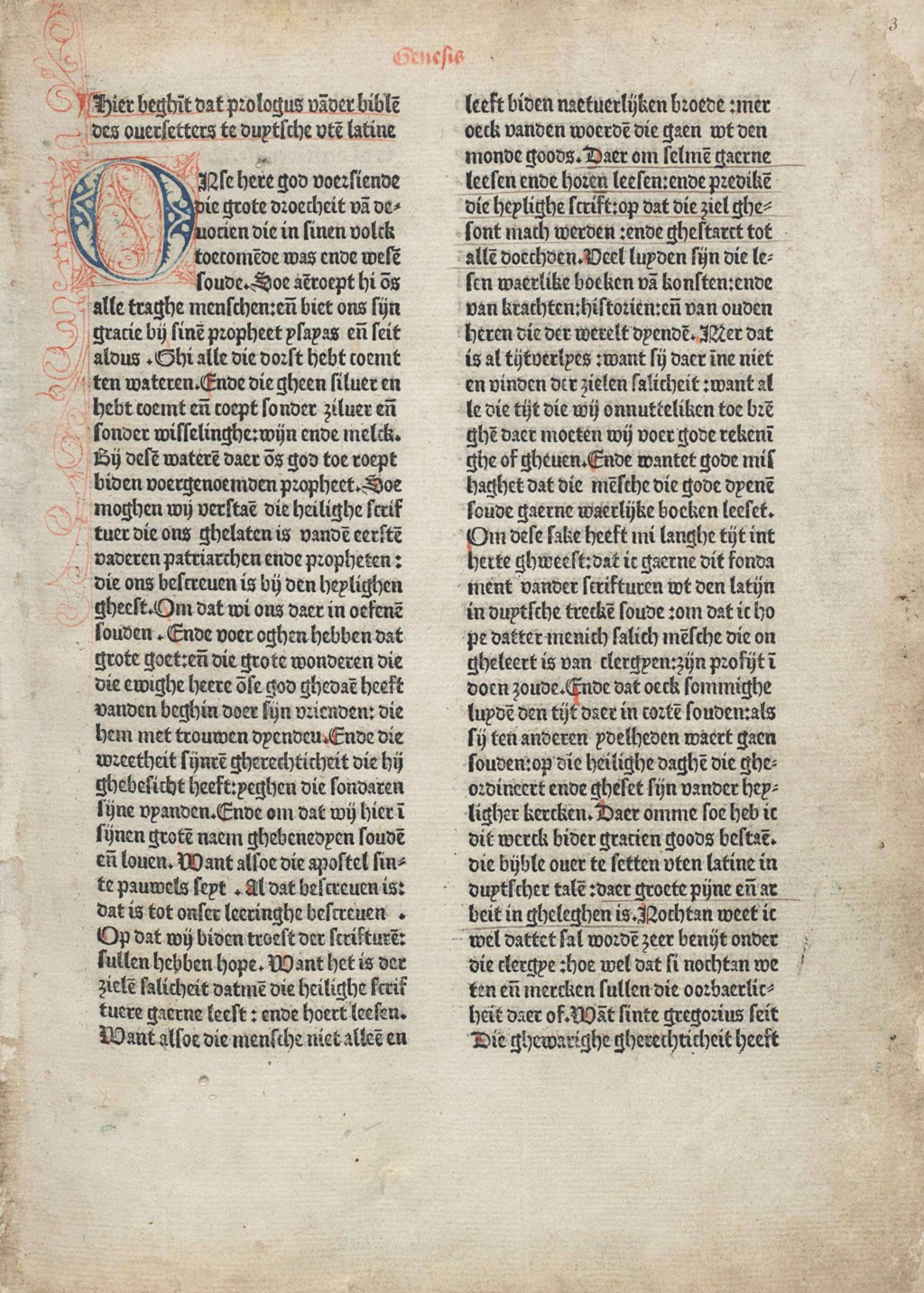

The Delft Bible (1477) is the first substantial Dutch Bible translation to be printed. It did not include the New Testament or the Psalms, which were already available in separate editions.
