= Reverential capitalization =

Applying capital letters to religious words

Reverential capitalization is the practice of capitalizing religious words that refer to deities or divine beings in cases where the words would not otherwise have been capitalized. Pronouns are also particularly included in reverential capitalization:

and God calleth to the light 'Day,' and to the darkness He hath called 'Night;' and there is an evening, and there is a morning — day one.

— Genesis 1:5, Young's Literal Translation (1862)

In this example, the proper name "God", like "Day" and "Night", is capitalized and the pronoun "He" is a reverential capitalization. While proper names are capitalized universally, reverence for any particular divinity is not universal. In short, when pronouns that are usually lowercase are capitalized, this usually implies that the author personally reveres and regards as a deity the antecedent of that pronoun.

Nouns used as titles for a deity may also be capitalized. Examples include "the Lord", "the Father" and "the Creator".

== Capitalizing nouns ==
Capitalization, punctuation and spelling were not well standardized in Early Modern English. For example, the 1611 King James Bible (KJV) did not capitalize pronouns:

For our heart shall rejoice in him, because we have trusted in his holy name.

— Psalm 33:21, KJV

In the 17th and 18th centuries, it became common to capitalize all nouns, as is still done in some other Germanic languages, including German.

In languages that capitalize all nouns, reverential capitalization of the first two letters or the whole word can sometimes be seen. The following is an example of a Christian creed in Danish, which capitalized nouns until 1948.

Vi troe paa en eeneste GUD, en almægtig Skaber af alle Ting, saavel synlige som u-synlige, og paa en HErre JEsum Christum, GUds eeneste Søn, fød af Faderen[...]

— Ludvig Holberg, Almindelig Kirke-Historie, 1738

(Translation) We believe in the one and only GOD, an almighty Creator of all Things, visible as well as invisible, and in a LOrd JEsus Christ, GOd's only Son, born of the Father[...]

Note that some instances are in all capitals (e.g., GUD "GOD"), and some begin with two capital letters (e.g., HErre "LOrd" and JEsum "JEsus"). Some words that refer to persons of the Christian Trinity begin with a single capital (e.g., Skaber "Creator", Christum "Christ", and Faderen "the Father"), but so do all other nouns (e.g., Ting "Things"). This type of reverential capitalization varies within a single sentence and would also be dependent on the author and the publisher of a work.

The convention of capitalizing all nouns was eventually abandoned in English; especially influential in this was Benjamin Blayney, who produced a 1769 edition of the King James Bible in which nouns were not capitalized—possibly simply to save space on the printed page.

Capitalization of deities is also customarily applied in religious texts written in Tagalog and other Philippine languages. This is despite the practice being considered non-standard and inconsistent by purists, who contend it applies only to English.

== Capitalizing pronouns ==
In the 19th century, it became common to capitalize pronouns referring to the God of the Abrahamic religions to show reverence:

For in Him doth our heart rejoice, For in His holy name we have trusted.

— Psalm 33:21, Young's Literal Translation (1862)

An interesting early case is Handel's 1741 oratorio Messiah, whose printed libretto and published score both use lowercase pronouns but whose conductor's holograph consistently capitalizes them.

…day of His coming … when He appeareth"

—

In the 20th century, this practice became far less common:

For our heart rejoices in him, because we have trusted in his holy name.

— Psalms 33:21, World English Bible (1997)

Today, there is no widely accepted rule in English on whether or not to use reverential capitalization. Different house styles have different rules, which are given by their style manuals. The Christian Writer's Manual of Style, the Chicago Manual of Style, and the Associated Press Stylebook do not recommend it. In contrast, reverential capitalization was prescribed by the United States Government Publishing Office's style manual of 2008.

Reverential capitalization is also used in the 21st Century King James Version and Biblehub's King James Purple Letter Edition.

== See also ==
- Nomina sacra – Christian scribal practice
- Royal we – Use of a first-person plural pronoun to refer to a single person
