= Statenvertaling =

Bible translation in Dutch language

De Statenvertaling
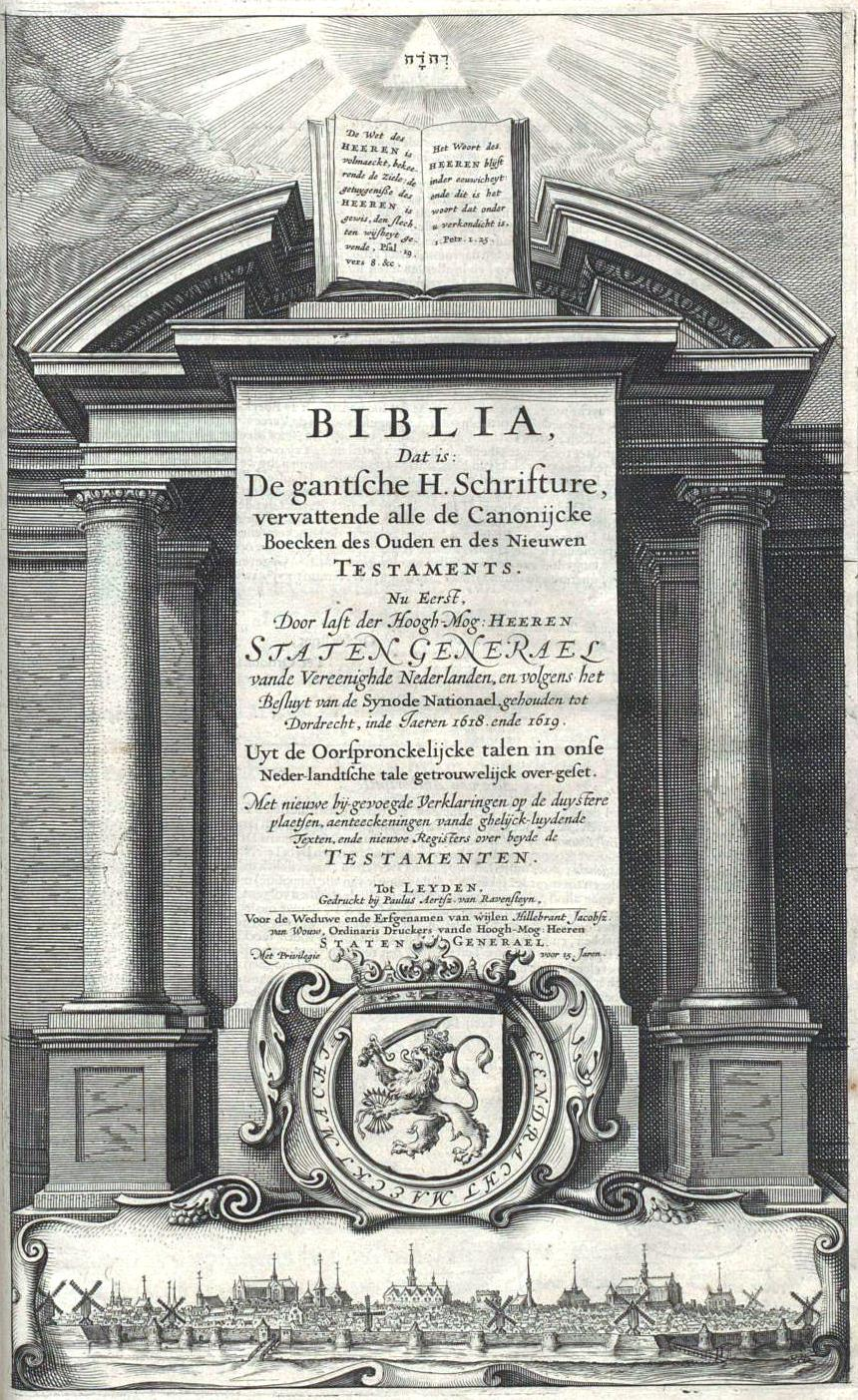
- Title page of the original 1637 Statenvertaling.
- Full name: BIBLIA, Dat is: De gantsche H. Schrifture, vervattende alle de Canonijcke Boecken des Ouden en des Nieuwen TESTAMENTS.
- Other names: Statenbijbel
- Language: Dutch
- Complete Bible published: 1637
- Apocrypha: Ezra 3, Ezra 4, Book of Tobit, Book of Judith, Book of Wisdom, Sirach, Book of Baruch with Letter of Jeremiah, Additions to Esther, Additions to Daniel, 1 Maccabees, 2 Maccabees, 3 Maccabees
- Authorship: OT: Johannes Bogerman, Willem Baudartius, Gerson Bucerus; NT and apocrypha: Jacobus Rolandus, Hermannus Faukelius, Petrus Cornelisz, Festus Hommius, Antonius Walaeus
- Revision: Ravesteyneditie, Jongbloededitie, GBS-Bijbel, Statenvertaling-1977, Herziene Statenvertaling
- Publisher: Machteld Aelbrechtsdochter
- Copyright: Public domain due to age
- Religious affiliation: Dutch Reformed Church
- Webpage: herzienestatenvertaling.nl/teksten/
- Genesis 1:1–3 In het begin schiep God de hemel en de aarde. De aarde nu was woest en leeg, en duisternis lag over de watervloed; en de Geest van God zweefde boven het water., En God zei: Laat er licht zijn! En er was licht. (Note: lit. 'In the beginning created God the heaven and the earth. The earth now was desolate and empty, and darkness lay over the deluge; and the Spirit of God hovered above the water., And God said: Let there light be! And there was light.') John 3:16 Want zo lief heeft God de wereld gehad, dat Hij Zijn eniggeboren Zoon gegeven heeft, opdat ieder die in Hem gelooft, niet verloren gaat, maar eeuwig leven heeft. (Note: lit. 'Because so love God the world had, that He His onlyborn Son gave, on that any who in Him believes, not lost goes, but eternal life has.')

The Statenvertaling (Dutch: [ˈstaːtə(ɱ)vərˌtaːlɪŋ], States Translation) or Statenbijbel (States Bible) was the first translation of the Bible from the original Hebrew, Aramaic and Greek languages into Dutch. It was ordered by the Synod of Dordrecht in 1618, financed by the government of the Protestant Dutch Republic and first published in 1637.

The first complete Dutch Bible had been printed in Antwerp in 1526 by Jacob van Liesvelt. Like other existing Dutch Bibles, however, it was merely a translation of other translations. Furthermore, the translation from Martin Luther was widely used, but it had a Lutheran interpretation. At the Synod of Dort in 1618/19, it was therefore deemed necessary to have a new translation accurately based on the original languages. The synod requested the States General of the Netherlands to commission it.

== Guidelines ==
The Statenvertaling was written with specific guidelines for translation established by the synod during its 8th session on 20 November 1618. The four main instructions to the translators were:

1. That they always carefully adhere to the original text, and that the manner of writing of the original languages be preserved, as much as the clarity and properties of Dutch speech permit. But in case where the Hebrew or Greek manner of speech was harder than could remain in the text, that they note this in the margin.
2. That they add as few words as possible to complete the meaning of a sentence if it is not expressed fully, and that these words be distinguished from the text with a different font and placed between brackets.
3. That they formulate a short and clear summary for each book and chapter and write this in the margin at the respective locations in the Holy Scriptures.
4. That they add a brief explanation providing insight to the translation of unclear passages; but the addition of lessons learned is neither necessary nor advisable.

=== Apocryphal books ===
Regarding the Biblical apocrypha, the synod decided to translate these books but not to make them part of the canon. They were placed after the books of the New Testament and preceded with a "warning for the reader".

=== Translation of God's name ===
In the Hebrew Bible, God's name is written with the four consonants YHWH (as seen on the very top of the title page in Hebrew characters), and would not be pronounced by the Jews. During the 12th session, the synod decided to translate God's name with "HEERE" ("LORD"). In the margin where God's name first appears, the following note is given:

Na de voleyndinge van het werck der scheppinge/ wort hier aldereerst Gode de naem van IEHOVAH gegeven/ beteeckenende de selfstandigen/ selfwesenden/ van hem selven zijnde van eeuwicheyt tot eeuwicheyt/ ende den oorspronck ofte oorsake van het wesen aller dinge; daerom oock dese naem de ware Godt alleen toecomt. Onthoudt dit eens voor al; waer ghy voortae het woort HEERE met groote letteren geschreven vindt/ dat aldaer in 't Hebr. het woort IEHOVAH, oft korter/ IAH staet.
(After the completion of the works of creation/ here for the first time God is given the name IEHOVAH/ meaning the independent/ self being/ being the same from eternity to eternity/ and the origin or cause of existence of all things; that is why this name only belongs to God. Remember for all time; wherever you from now on see the word LORD written in capital letters/ that there in Hebr. the word IEHOVAH, or shorter/ IAH is stated.)

== Influence ==
The 1657 English Version owed itself to the close contact between the Puritans in Holland and England. In 1646 the House of Lords in England commissioned Theodore Haak (1605–1690) a respected German polyglot and academic to begin work on an English translation of the Statenvertaling met Aantekeningen – the Dutch State Bible. There is a suggestion that the Westminster Assembly initiated the project in 1645, but there is no evidence that the Westminster Assembly discussed the matter in that year. Charles Spurgeon, a Calvinist Baptist, wrote: "Haak's Annotations come to us as the offspring of the famous Synod of Dort, and the Westminster Annotations as the production of a still more venerable assembly; but if, with my hat off, bowing profoundly to those august conclaves of master minds, I may venture to say so, I would observe that they furnish another instance that committees seldom equal the labors of individuals. The notes are too short and fragmentary to be of any great value. The volumes are a heavy investment."
