= List of Garuda Indonesia destinations =

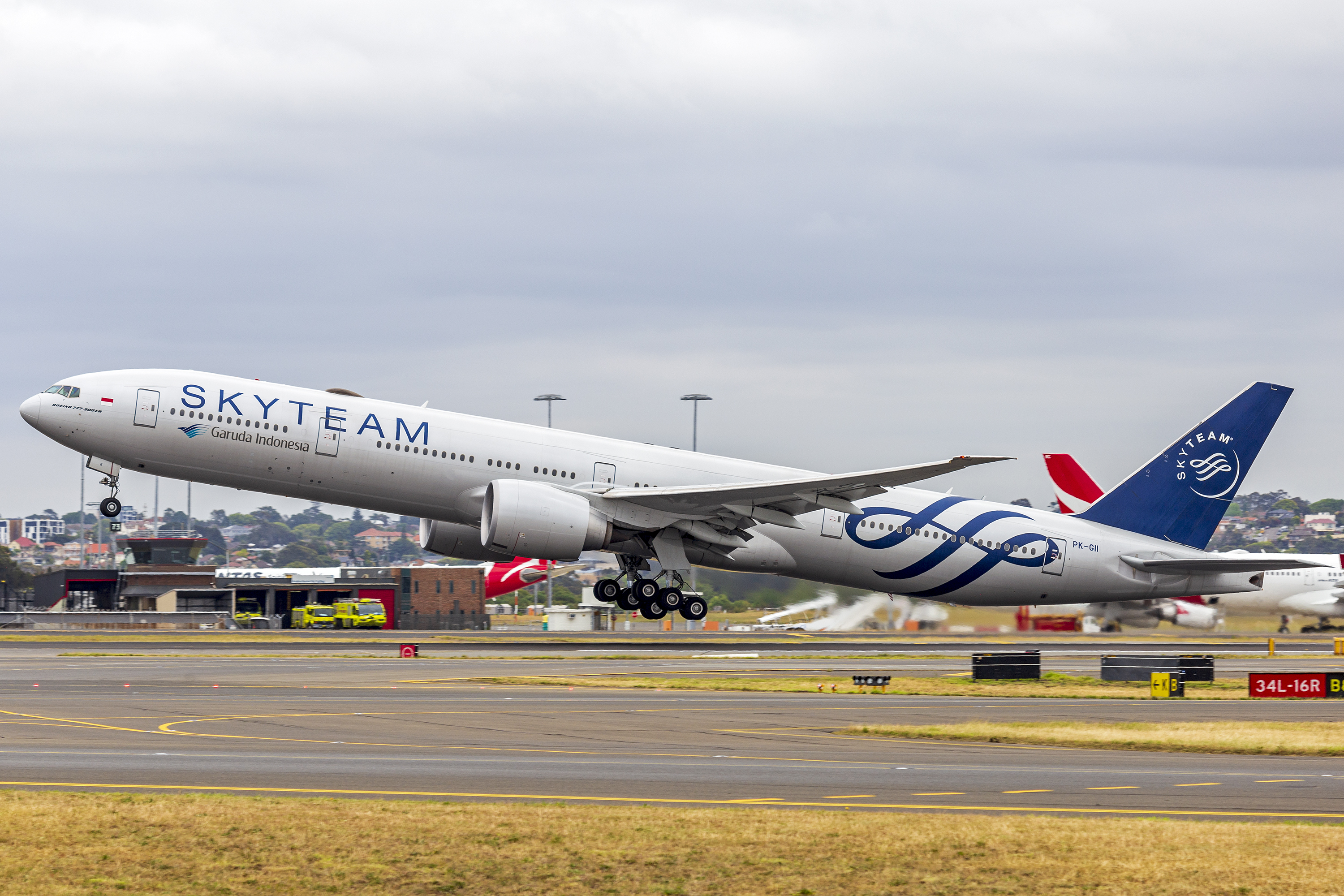
A Garuda Indonesia Boeing 777-300ER, wearing the livery showing affiliation with the SkyTeam alliance, which gifted the airline codeshare agreements to expand its route map. This fleet is used exclusively for middle and long-haul routes, as well as high-demand short routes.

Flag carrier Garuda Indonesia had its inaugural flight on 26 January 1946, from Calcutta to Rangoon, using a Douglas DC-3 with the tail number RI 001, named Seulawah. It operated as Indonesian Airways. President Sukarno changed the name to Garuda Indonesia Airways in November 1946, later Garuda Indonesia.

The golden age of the airline started in 1956, when it operated Hajj flights using its eight Convair CV-240s. In 1963, it operated flights to Tokyo via Hong Kong using three Lockheed L-188 Electra. In 1965, Garuda expanded its destinations, with flights to Cambodia, China, Paris, Athens, and Prague. It also opened routes to Amsterdam from Jakarta, with stopovers in Bangkok, Mumbai, Karachi, Cairo, Rome, and Frankfurt. Australian routes were also introduced. At former CEO Reyn Altin Johannes Lumenta's request, Garuda dilated its route map, with services to Los Angeles via Honolulu in 1990, operated using the McDonnell Douglas MD-11.

The airline's fall began with two crashes in 1996 and 1997. The 1997 Asian financial crisis caused Garuda to abruptly terminate its intercontinental services, though Amsterdam, Frankfurt, and London services were continued until 28 October 2004. The September 11 attacks, 2002 Bali bombings, 2004 Indian Ocean earthquake and tsunami, and SARS outbreak further contributed to the fall of the airline. It climaxed in 2007, when the crash of Flight 200 prompted the European Union (EU) to ban Indonesian airlines in its airspace.

After the EU lifted its ban in July 2009, Garuda began an aggressive five-year expansion plan known as the Quantum Leap, involving an image overhaul. Using the Boeing 777-300ER Garuda reopened flights to London via Amsterdam. However, after years of success thanks to the Leap, Ari Askhara taking over the CEO position made the airline inconsistent in destinations; his leadership has drawn criticism.

== List ==
Country or territory	City	Airport	Notes	Refs
Australia	Adelaide	Adelaide Airport	Terminated	
Australia	Brisbane	Brisbane Airport	Terminated	
Australia	Cairns	Cairns Airport	Terminated	
Australia	Christmas Island	Christmas Island Airport ^{Charter}	Terminated	
Australia	Darwin	Darwin International Airport	Terminated	
Australia	Melbourne	Melbourne Airport		
Australia	Perth	Perth Airport	Terminated	
Australia	Port Hedland	Port Hedland International Airport	Terminated	
Australia	Sydney	Sydney Airport		
Australia	Townsville	Townsville Airport	Terminated	
Austria	Vienna	Vienna International Airport	Terminated	
Cambodia	Phnom Penh	Phnom Penh International Airport	Airport closed	
China	Beijing	Beijing Capital International Airport	Terminated	
China	Chengdu	Chengdu Shuangliu International Airport	Terminated	
China	Guangzhou	Guangzhou Baiyun International Airport		
China	Shanghai	Shanghai Pudong International Airport		
Czech Republic	Prague	Václav Havel Airport Prague	Terminated	
East Timor	Dili	Presidente Nicolau Lobato International Airport	Terminated	
France	Paris	Charles de Gaulle Airport	Terminated	
France	Paris	Le Bourget Airport	Terminated	
Germany	Berlin	Berlin Schönefeld Airport	Airport closed	
Germany	Frankfurt	Frankfurt Airport	Terminated	
Germany	Munich	Munich Airport	Terminated	
Guam	Hagåtña	Antonio B. Won Pat International Airport	Terminated	
Greece	Athens	Ellinikon International Airport	Airport closed	
Hong Kong	Hong Kong	Hong Kong International Airport		
Hong Kong	Hong Kong	Kai Tak Airport	Airport closed	
India	Mumbai	Chhatrapati Shivaji Maharaj International Airport	Terminated	
Indonesia	Ambon	Pattimura Airport		
Indonesia	Balikpapan	Sultan Aji Muhammad Sulaiman Sepinggan Airport	Hub	
Indonesia	Banda Aceh	Sultan Iskandar Muda International Airport		
Indonesia	Bandar Lampung	Radin Inten II Airport		
Indonesia	Bandung	Husein Sastranegara Airport		
Indonesia	Banjarmasin	Syamsudin Noor International Airport		
Indonesia	Banyuwangi	Banyuwangi Airport	Terminated	
Indonesia	Batam	Hang Nadim International Airport		
Indonesia	Baubau	Betoambari Airport	Terminated	
Indonesia	Bengkulu	Fatmawati Soekarno Airport	Terminated	
Indonesia	Berau	Kalimarau Airport	Terminated	
Indonesia	Biak	Frans Kaisiepo Airport	Terminated	
Indonesia	Bima	Sultan Muhammad Salahudin Airport	Terminated	
Indonesia	Denpasar	Ngurah Rai International Airport	Hub	
Indonesia	Ende	H. Hasan Aroeboesman Airport	Terminated	
Indonesia	Gorontalo	Djalaluddin Airport		
Indonesia	Gunungsitoli	Binaka Airport	Terminated	
Indonesia	Jakarta	Halim Perdanakusuma International Airport	Terminated	
Indonesia	Jakarta	Kemayoran Airport	Airport closed	
Indonesia	Jakarta	Soekarno–Hatta International Airport	Hub	
Indonesia	Jambi	Sultan Thaha Airport		
Indonesia	Jayapura	Sentani International Airport		
Indonesia	Kaimana	Utarom Airport	Terminated	
Indonesia	Kendari	Haluoleo Airport		
Indonesia	Ketapang	Rahadi Oesman Airport	Terminated	
Indonesia	Kolaka	Sangia Nibandera Airport	Terminated	
Indonesia	Kupang	El Tari Airport		
Indonesia	Labuan Bajo	Komodo International Airport		
Indonesia	Luwuk	Syukuran Aminuddin Amir Airport	Terminated	
Indonesia	Makassar	Sultan Hasanuddin International Airport	Hub	
Indonesia	Manado	Sam Ratulangi International Airport		
Indonesia	Manokwari	Rendani Airport	Terminated	
Indonesia	Mamuju	Tampa Padang Airport	Terminated	
Indonesia	Malang	Abdul Rachman Saleh Airport	Terminated	
Indonesia	Mataram	Lombok International Airport		
Indonesia	Maumere	Frans Xavier Seda Airport	Terminated	
Indonesia	Medan	Kualanamu International Airport	Hub	
Indonesia	Melonguane	Melangguane Airport	Terminated	
Indonesia	Merauke	Mopah Airport		
Indonesia	Nabire	Douw Aturure Airport	Terminated	
Indonesia	Padang	Minangkabau International Airport		
Indonesia	Palangkaraya	Tjilik Riwut Airport		
Indonesia	Palembang	Sultan Mahmud Badaruddin II International Airport		
Indonesia	Palu	Mutiara SIS Al-Jufrie Airport		
Indonesia	Palopo	Bua Airport	Terminated	
Indonesia	Pangkalan Bun	Iskandar Airport	Terminated	
Indonesia	Pangkalpinang	Depati Amir Airport		
Indonesia	Pekanbaru	Sultan Syarif Kasim II International Airport		
Indonesia	Putussibau	Pangsuma Airport	Terminated	
Indonesia	Pontianak	Supadio International Airport		
Indonesia	Raha	Sugimanuru Airport	Terminated	
Indonesia	Samarinda	Aji Pangeran Tumenggung Pranoto Airport		
Indonesia	Selayar	H. Aroeppala Airport	Terminated	
Indonesia	Semarang	Jenderal Ahmad Yani International Airport		
Indonesia	Sibolga	Ferdinand Lumban Tobing Airport	Terminated	
Indonesia	Siborong-Borong	Raja Sisingamangaraja XII Airport	Terminated	
Indonesia	Sintang	Tebelian Airport	Terminated	
Indonesia	Sorong	Domine Eduard Osok Airport		
Indonesia	Sumbawa Besar	Sultan Muhammad Kaharuddin III Airport	Terminated	
Indonesia	Surabaya	Juanda International Airport	Hub	
Indonesia	Surakarta	Adisoemarmo International Airport		
Indonesia	Tambolaka	Lede Kalumbang Airport	Terminated	
Indonesia	Tana Toraja	Toraja Airport	Terminated	
Indonesia	Tanjungpandan	H.A.S. Hanandjoeddin International Airport	Terminated	
Indonesia	Tanjungpinang	Raja Haji Fisabilillah Airport	Terminated	
Indonesia	Tarakan	Juwata Airport	Terminated	
Indonesia	Ternate	Sultan Babullah Airport		
Indonesia	Timika	Mozes Kilangin Airport		
Indonesia	Tobelo	Kuabang Airport	Terminated	
Indonesia	Yogyakarta	Adisutjipto Airport	Terminated	
Indonesia	Yogyakarta	Yogyakarta International Airport		
Italy	Rome	Rome Fiumicino Airport	Terminated	
Japan	Fukuoka	Fukuoka Airport	Terminated	
Japan	Nagoya	Chubu Centrair International Airport	Terminated	
Japan	Osaka	Kansai International Airport	Terminated	
Japan	Tokyo	Haneda Airport		
Japan	Tokyo	Narita International Airport		
Malaysia	Kota Kinabalu	Kota Kinabalu International Airport	Terminated	
Malaysia	Kuala Lumpur	Kuala Lumpur International Airport		
Malaysia	Penang	Penang International Airport	Terminated	
Netherlands	Amsterdam	Amsterdam Airport Schiphol		
New Zealand	Auckland	Auckland Airport	Terminated	
Pakistan	Karachi	Jinnah International Airport	Terminated	
Philippines	Davao	Francisco Bangoy International Airport	Terminated	
Philippines	Manila	Ninoy Aquino International Airport	Terminated	
Qatar	Doha	Hamad International Airport		
Saudi Arabia	Dhahran	Dhahran International Airport	Airport closed	
Saudi Arabia	Jeddah	King Abdulaziz International Airport		
Saudi Arabia	Medina	Prince Mohammad bin Abdulaziz International Airport		
Saudi Arabia	Riyadh	King Khalid International Airport	Terminated	
Singapore	Singapore	Changi Airport		
Singapore	Singapore	Singapore International Airport	Airport closed	
South Korea	Seoul	Incheon International Airport		
Sri Lanka	Colombo	Bandaranaike International Airport	Terminated	
Spain	Madrid	Adolfo Suárez Madrid–Barajas Airport	Terminated	
Switzerland	Zurich	Zurich Airport	Terminated	
Taiwan	Kaohsiung	Kaohsiung International Airport	Terminated	
Taiwan	Taipei	Taoyuan International Airport	Terminated	
Thailand	Bangkok	Suvarnabhumi Airport		
United Arab Emirates	Abu Dhabi	Zayed International Airport	Terminated	
United Arab Emirates	Dubai	Dubai International Airport	Terminated	
United Kingdom	London	Gatwick Airport	Terminated	
United Kingdom	London	Heathrow Airport	Terminated	
United States	Honolulu	Daniel K. Inouye International Airport	Terminated	
United States	Los Angeles	Los Angeles International Airport	Terminated	
Vietnam	Ho Chi Minh City	Tan Son Nhat International Airport	Terminated	
