= Arung Palakka Airport =

Airport in Indonesia

Arung Palakka Airport Bandar Udara Arung Palakka
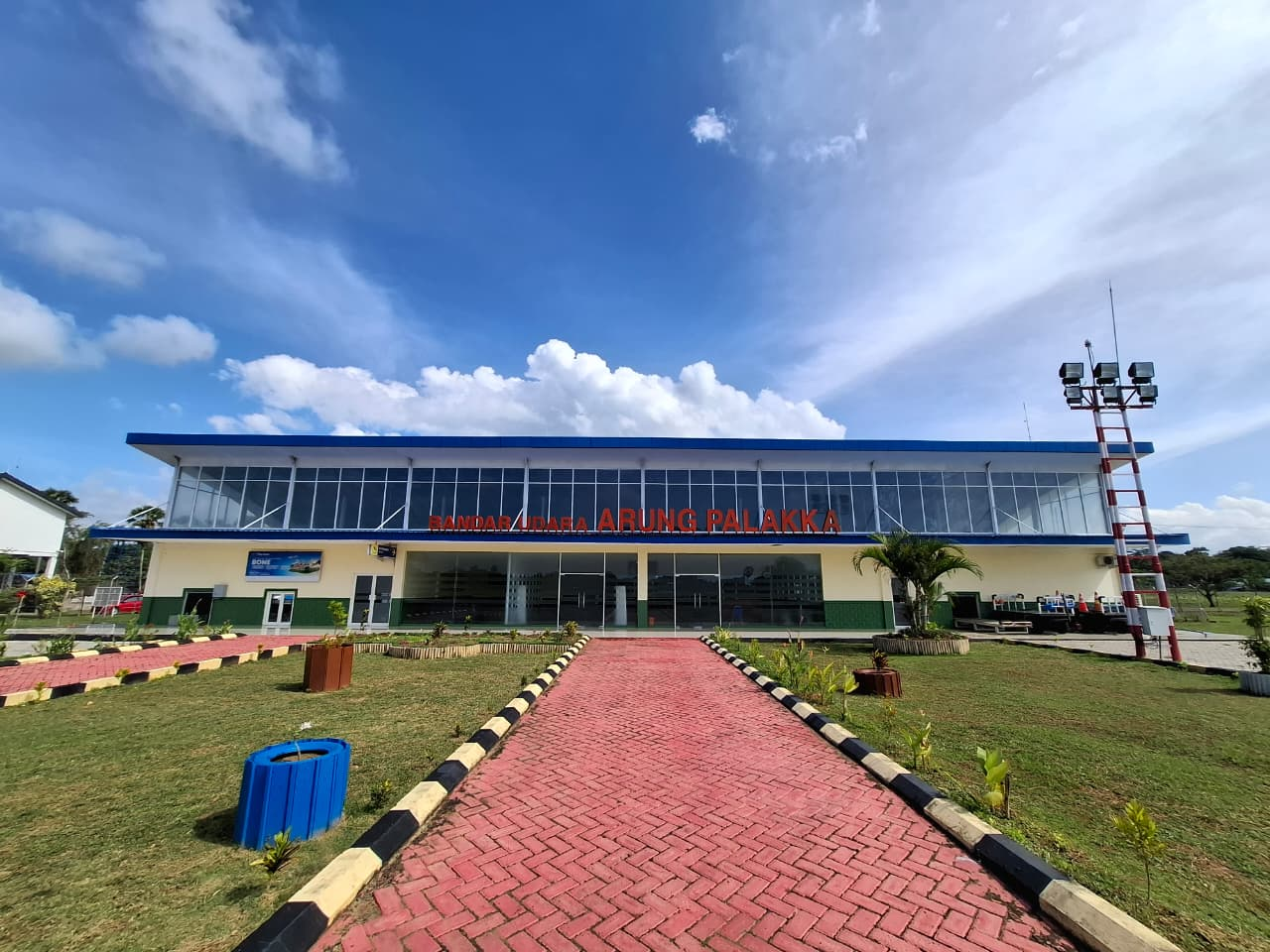
- IATA: APD; ICAO: WAWN

Summary
- Airport type: Public
- Owner: Government of Indonesia
- Operator: Directorate General of Civil Aviation
- Serves: Bone Regency
- Location: Awangpone District, Bone Regency, South Sulawesi, Indonesia
- Time zone: WITA (UTC+08:00)
- Elevation AMSL: 3 m (9.8 ft)
- Coordinates: 04°27′34.2″S 120°18′36.5″E

Map
- Location in Sulawesi Location in Indonesia

Runways
Direction	Length		Surface
Direction	m	ft	Surface
11/27	1,400	4,593	Asphalt

Statistics (2024)
- Passengers: 65 (▼97.85%)
- Cargo (tonnes): N/A
- Aircraft movements: 18 (▼95.14%)
- Source: DGCA

Arung Palakka Airport (IATA: APD, ICAO: WAWN), formerly known as Mappalo Ulaweng Airport, is a domestic airport serving Bone Regency in South Sulawesi, Indonesia. The airport is named after Arung Palakka, a 17th-century Buginese prince and nobleman who became the King of Bone following the Makassar War. The name reflects the airport's connection to the historical and cultural heritage of the Bone region. Located in Awangpone District, approximately 10 km (6.2 mi) from Watampone, the administrative capital and largest town of Bone Regency, the airport serves as the principal gateway to the regency and surrounding areas by air. The airport is currently served exclusively by FlyJaya, which connects Bone with several cities across Sulawesi, including Makassar, Kendari, and Morowali, as well as Balikpapan in East Kalimantan.

== History ==
=== Construction and early history ===
The development of the airport began with the issuance of a site designation decree by the Ministry of Transportation, as part of the government’s efforts to improve regional connectivity and promote economic growth in eastern South Sulawesi. The airport was built on farmland owned by local residents, which was acquired by the Bone Regency government for the construction of the airport. Physical construction of the airport commenced in 2007, but after multiple delays, the project was not completed until late 2012. Due to the absence of an airline willing to commence scheduled services, the airport did not begin serving commercial flights until 2013. At the time, the airport had a runway measuring only 900 m (2,953 ft) in length, limiting it to smaller aircraft such as the DHC-6 Twin Otter and CASA C-212. The airport was intended to serve as a major air transport gateway for four surrounding regencies: Bone, Soppeng, Wajo, and Sinjai. The airport was officially inaugurated on 19 December 2014 by then-Minister of Transportation Ignasius Jonan, as part of a nationwide inauguration ceremony held simultaneously for 20 ports and 10 airports.

The airport was originally named Mappalo Ulaweng Airport, after the village in which it is located. In 2015, the Ministry of Transportation renamed the airport to Arung Palakka Bone Airport, in honor of Arung Palakka, a prominent historical figure of the Kingdom of Bone who played a significant role in the history of South Sulawesi. Initially, the airport was managed by Andi Jemma Airport in Masamba before establishing its own management in 2015.

During its initial operations, the airport served pioneer flights connecting Bone Regency with other areas from 2015 to 2017. At the time, Susi Air operated a Makassar–Bone–Kendari route, although the service was discontinued in 2016 due to low passenger demand. Another airline serving Bone was Aviastar. At its peak in 2016, the airport was connected to several towns and cities across Sulawesi, including Mamuju, Kolaka, and Selayar, in addition to Makassar and Kendari. During the same period, the airport underwent a series of upgrades, including improvements to its terminal and perimeter fence.

Flight operations at the airport were subsequently suspended in 2017 following changes to government policy regarding the provision of pioneer air transport services, which resulted in the airport no longer meeting the criteria for designation as a pioneer airport. The situation was further compounded by the airport's relatively short 1,200 m (3,937 ft) runway, which limited its ability to accommodate larger commercial aircraft such as the ATR 72. Several efforts were made to restore flights to and from the airport during this period, but these attempts were ultimately unsuccessful.

=== Contemporary history ===
In 2021, plans to renovate the terminal and upgrade the runway were announced. At the same time, the South Sulawesi provincial government announced plans to reactivate the airport to help alleviate congestion at Sultan Hasanuddin International Airport in Makassar, while also serving the Bone metropolitan area, the second-largest urban agglomeration in South Sulawesi after Makassar.

After a five-year hiatus, the airport resumed operations in December 2022, when Susi Air reinstated flights connecting Bone with Makassar and Kendari, while also introducing a new route to Balikpapan, following the provision of subsidies by the South Sulawesi provincial government. However, services were discontinued again the following month following the expiration of the subsidy agreement between both parties. Flight operations resumed in May 2023 after a new agreement was reached between the two parties, allowing the subsidized services to be reinstated.

Between 2023 and 2024, the runway was extended to 1,400 × 30 m, allowing the airport to accommodate ATR 72 aircraft. On 13 September 2025, the first ATR 72 landed at the airport, operated by FlyJaya, marking the launch of the airline’s Makassar–Bone route. In the following months, FlyJaya added routes to Kendari and Balikpapan, followed by a route to Morowali in February 2026. The airline also announced plans to introduce additional routes in the future, including a proposed Bone–Mamuju service . The introduction of these new routes, which were subsidized by the South Sulawesi provincial government, led to a significant increase in passenger traffic at the airport in 2025. In addition to FlyJaya, several other airlines, including Trigana Air, have expressed interest in operating flights to the airport. The airport authority has also been lobbying Lion Air and Batik Air to introduce services to Bone, although the introduction of such flights is dependent on the completion of the runway extension.

== Facilities and development ==
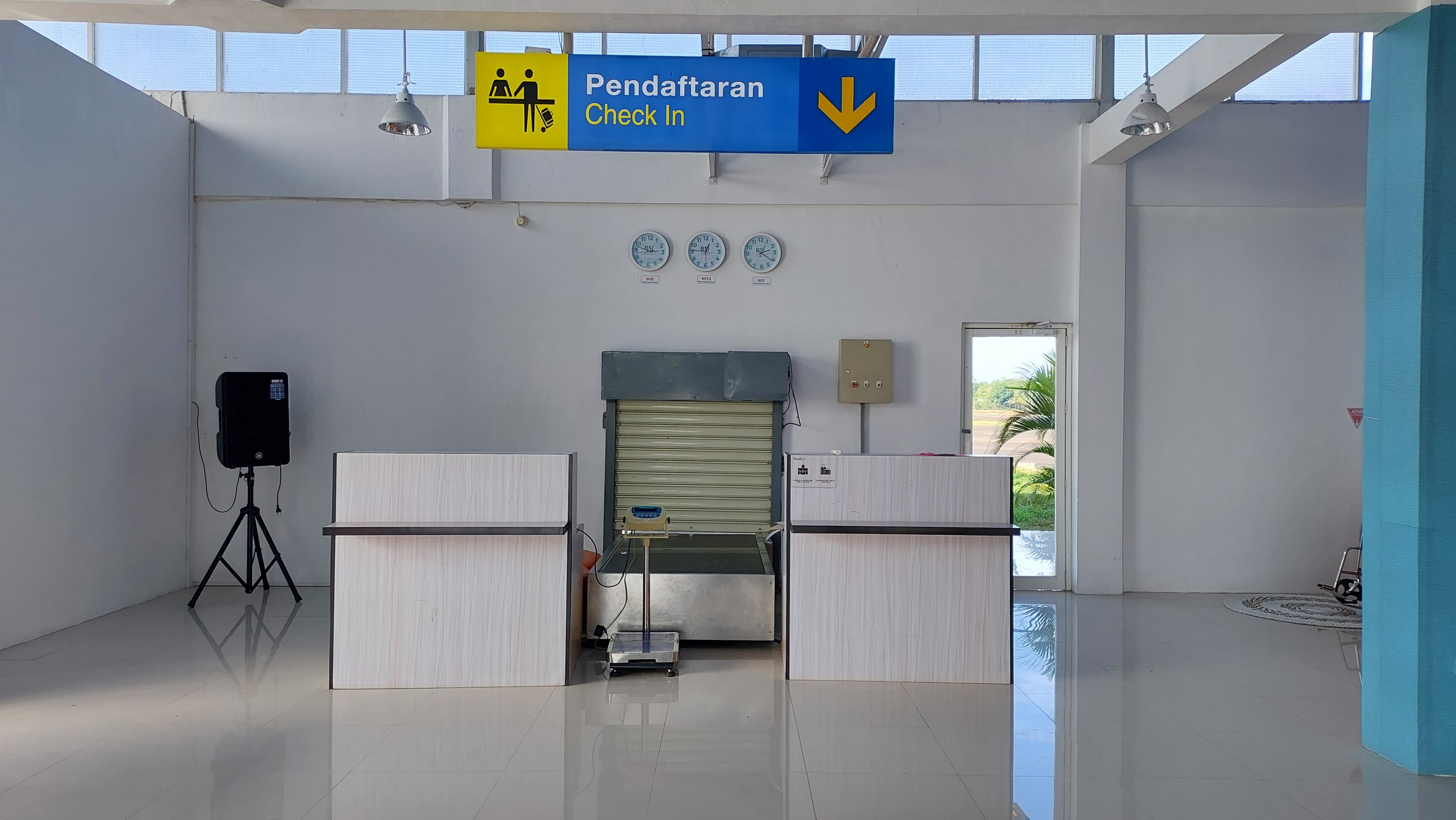
Check-in counters

The airport has a single passenger terminal measuring 600 m², with an annual handling capacity of approximately 24,800 passengers. The modest terminal is equipped with only two check-in counters. The airport is also supported by several ancillary facilities, including an administrative office building, an aircraft rescue and firefighting (ARFF) facility, and a 1,309 m² parking area.

On the airside, the runway currently measures 1,400 m × 30 m, having been extended from 1,200 m in 2023 in order to accommodate ATR 72 aircraft. The airport is equipped with a single taxiway measuring 96.5 m × 15 m and a single apron measuring 80 m × 70 m.

Under the original 2021 master plan, the runway was slated to be extended to 2,100 m to accommodate narrow-body aircraft such as the Boeing 737 and Airbus A320. In 2026, the South Sulawesi provincial government announced plans to extend the runway up to 2,600 m, potentially enabling direct flights to Jakarta and even Jeddah, Saudi Arabia, for Hajj pilgrims. In preparation for the extension, the government began clearing approximately 21.9 hectares of land. The process was initially hindered by resistance from local residents whose properties were affected, stemming from disputes over compensation for the land acquisition. As of March 2026, the land-clearing process for the runway extension remains ongoing.

In August 2025, the Banyuwangi Indonesian Pilot Flight Academy (API Banyuwangi) announced plans to establish a flight training academy at the airport with support from the Ministry of Transportation. The proposed development includes classrooms, a control tower, other supporting facilities, and an aircraft refueling station.

== Airlines and destinations ==
Airlines	Destinations
FlyJaya	Balikpapan, Kendari, Makassar

== Statistics ==
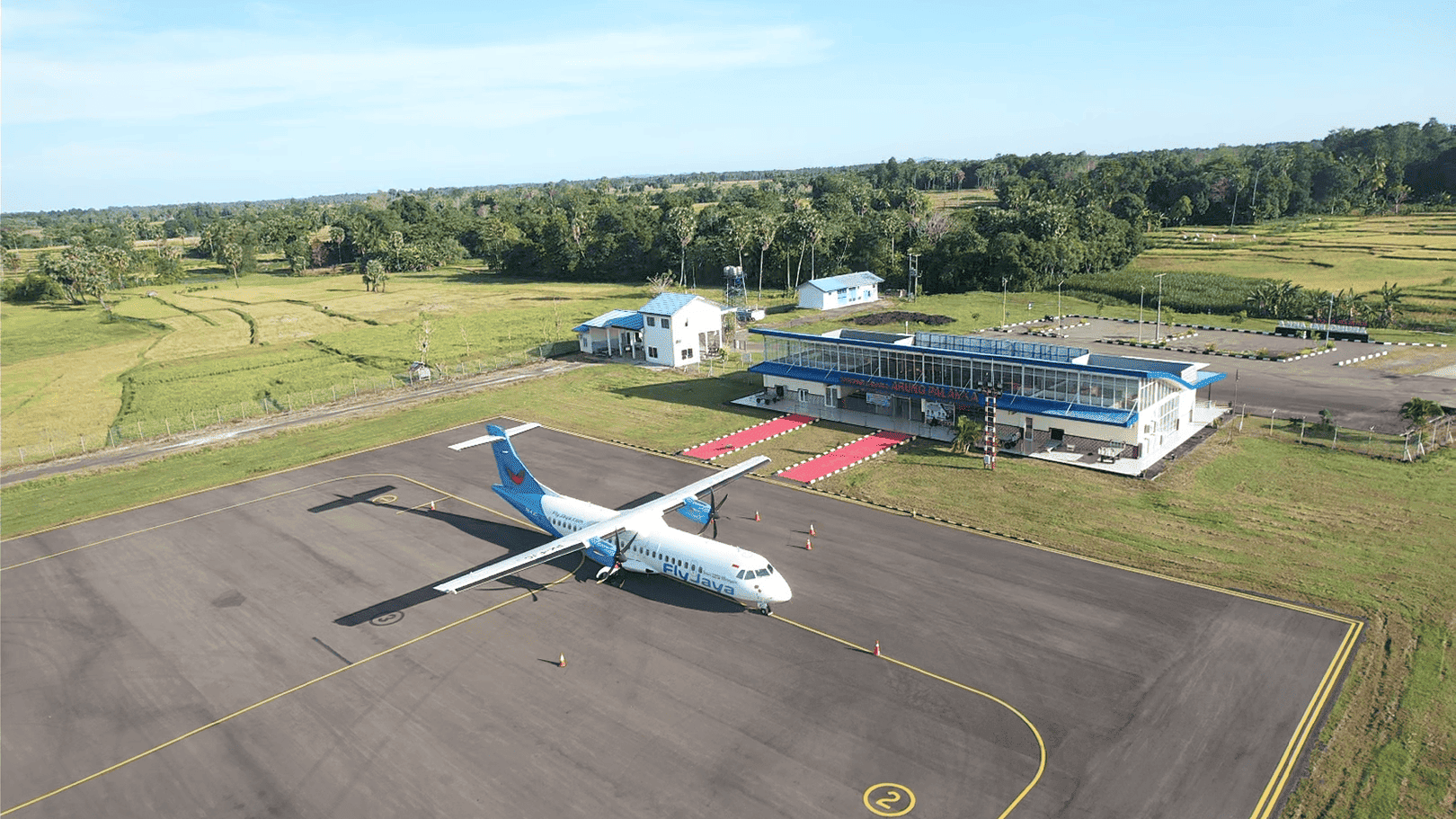
A FlyJaya ATR 72-500 at Arung Palakka Airport

Annual passenger numbers and aircraft statistics
Year	Passengers handled	Passenger % change	Cargo (tonnes)	Cargo % change	Aircraft movements	Aircraft % change
2013	N/A	Steady	N/A	Steady	N/A	Steady
2014	2,152	Steady	0.01	Steady	228	Steady
2015	1,856	▼13.75	N/A	Steady	656	▲187.72
2016	752	▼59.48	N/A	Steady	662	▲0.91
2017	40	▼94.68	0.15	Steady	120	▼81.87
2018	N/A	Steady	N/A	Steady	N/A	Steady
2019	N/A	Steady	N/A	Steady	N/A	Steady
2020	1,419	Steady	N/A	Steady	546	Steady
2021	N/A	Steady	N/A	Steady	N/A	Steady
2022	507	Steady	N/A	Steady	78	Steady
2023	3,029	▲497.44	N/A	Steady	370	▲374.36
2024	65	▼97.85	N/A	Steady	18	▼95.14
Source: DGCA, BPS
