= WAWM =

WAWM may refer to:

- WAWM (FM), a radio station (98.9 FM) licensed to serve Petoskey, Michigan, United States
- Andi Jemma Airport (ICAO code WAWM)
