= Notohadinegoro Airport =

Airport serving Jember, East Java, Indonesia

Notohadinegoro Airport Bandar Udara Notohadinegoro
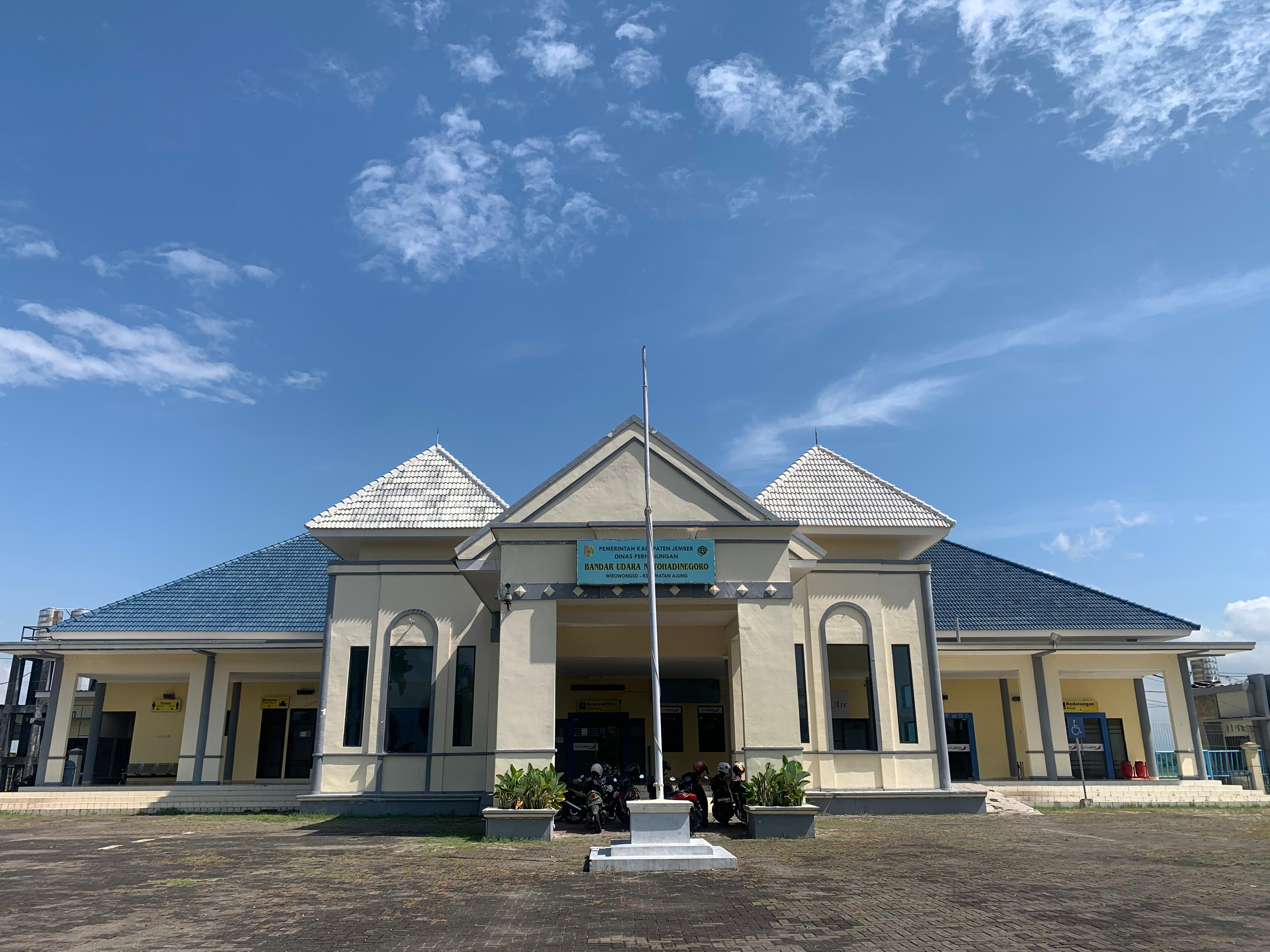
- IATA: JBB; ICAO: WARE

Summary
- Airport type: Public
- Owner: Government of Indonesia
- Operator: Jember Regency Government
- Serves: Jember
- Location: Ajung District, Jember Regency, East Java, Indonesia
- Opened: 2005; 21 years ago
- Time zone: WIB (UTC+07:00)
- Elevation AMSL: 85.65 m (281.0 ft)
- Coordinates: 08°14′28″S 113°41′38″E

Map
- Location in Java JBB (Indonesia)

Runways
Direction	Length		Surface
Direction	m	ft	Surface
02/20	1,645	5,397	Asphalt

Statistics (2024)
- Passengers: 552 (▼15.85%)
- Cargo (tonnes): N/A
- Aircraft movements: 106 (▲16.48%)
- Source: DGCA

Notohadinegoro Airport (IATA: JBB, ICAO: WARE) is a domestic airport serving Jember Regency, in the eastern salient of Java, Indonesia. The airport is named after Notohadinegoro, a former Regent of Jember who served during the Dutch colonial period from 1929 until the onset of the Japanese occupation in 1942. Inaugurated in 2005, the airport is located in Ajung District, approximately 8.2 km (5.1 mi) from Jember town centre, the administrative centre of the regency. As of 2026, flight operations at the airport are very limited, with FlyJaya being the sole airline operating there and serving a single route between Jember and Halim Perdanakusuma International Airport in Jakarta. The airport previously had scheduled flights to Surabaya and Denpasar in Bali, operated by Citilink, Garuda Indonesia and Wings Air, as well as pioneer flights to Sumenep in Madura operated by Susi Air. All of these services have since been discontinued.

== History ==
=== Construction and early history ===
The idea of constructing a new airport to serve Jember was initiated during the tenure of former Jember Regent Samsul Hadi Siswoyo, who served from 2000 to 2005. The project was intended to meet the growing demand for air travel among residents of Jember and surrounding areas, including Lumajang, Bondowoso, and Situbondo, by providing a faster means of transportation to and from the region. To construct the new airport, the Jember Regency Government selected a 120-hectare site in Wirowongso Village, Ajung District. The land was formerly owned by Perkebunan Nusantara XII (PTPN XII). Construction began in 2003, funded by the Jember Regency Government with an allocation of Rp30 billion. The airport was inaugurated on 9 January 2005 with a 1,200-metre runway. During the inauguration, a Fokker F27 carrying former President Abdurrahman Wahid, Minister of Transportation Hatta Rajasa, and several other government officials landed at the airport from Surabaya as part of a proving flight.

The airport was named after Raden Noto Hadinegoro, the first Regent of Jember, who served from 1929 to 1942 during the Dutch colonial period. He was known for his active role in developing infrastructure in Jember, and the naming of the airport serves as a tribute to his contributions to the development of the region.

During the initial stage of development, the local government focused on strengthening and paving the runway, as well as constructing a small terminal intended to accommodate pioneer and charter flights. This infrastructure provided an important foundation for supporting government survey operations and the distribution of supplies to remote areas of Jember.

Despite being inaugurated in 2005, however, the airport remained unused and did not handle any flights for the following three years. On 13 August 2008, a Let L-410 Turbolet conducted a test flight and landed at the airport, marking the first aircraft movement at Notohadinegoro Airport after several years. Following the test flight, the airport began regular commercial operations with a single route to Surabaya, operated by Tri-MG Intra Asia Airlines. However, the service lasted only three months due to low passenger demand, after which the airport ceased operations and remained without scheduled flights for the next six years. It was also alleged that corruption amounting to Rp5.7 billion occurred during the airport's three-month period of operation. Three Jember officials were subsequently named suspects in the case by the East Java High Prosecutor's Office.

During periods of inactivity, the airport fell into a state of disrepair. Several buildings within the airport grounds deteriorated, with damage reported to their roofs, walls, and floors. Roof tiles developed leaks, sections of ceilings collapsed, and some glass panels in doors were broken or missing. Parts of the asphalt at the ends and edges of the runway also deteriorated, developing cracks and surface damage. Vegetation became overgrown along both sides of the runway. Despite its limited use, the airport grounds have occasionally been used to host public events, including car and bicycle racing competitions.

=== Contemporary history ===
After years without commercial service, passenger flights resumed on 16 July 2014, when Garuda Indonesia inaugurated a new route between Jember and Surabaya, operated with an ATR 72-600. The launch of the service coincided with the completion of the airport's runway extension, which increased its length from 1,200 metres to 1,600 metres and enabled the airport to accommodate the ATR 72-600. The runway extension project began in 2013 with a budget of Rp3.2 billion, funded through the Jember Regency Government's regional budget (APBD).

On 13 August 2017, then-President Joko Widodo arrived at Notohadinegoro Airport aboard a British Aerospace 146 during a state visit to Jember. During his visit, Widodo instructed the government to develop the airport, including extending the runway to enable the operation of longer-distance routes and accommodate larger aircraft such as the Boeing 737. The proposed development was expected to be funded through the national budget (APBN), with an estimated cost of Rp300–450 billion.

In November 2019, it was discovered that the airport's operating license had expired in March 2018. The revelation prompted the Jember Regency Regional People's Representative Council (DPRD) to summon local officials from the Transportation Agency (Dinas Perhubungan) for a clarification meeting. In January 2020, the Directorate General of Civil Aviation dispatched several audit teams to inspect the airport. Following the inspection, the teams concluded that the airport could continue operating while the renewal of its operating license was being processed.

In October 2020, Wings Air suspended its Surabaya–Jember route due to low passenger demand amid the COVID-19 pandemic. The suspension marked the end of scheduled passenger services at the airport, following the withdrawal of Garuda Indonesia and Citilink, which had discontinued their respective services in 2019. Notohadinegoro Airport subsequently had no regular commercial flights for the next two years.

On 10 January 2023, Susi Air inaugurated a weekly pioneer service between Jember and Sumenep, operated with a Cessna Grand Caravan. The service was increased to twice weekly in January 2024. However, Susi Air discontinued the pioneer service on 2 January 2025 following the withdrawal of government subsidies for pioneer air services by the Ministry of Transportation, once again leaving the airport without scheduled commercial service.

Commercial service resumed on 17 August 2025 with a proving flight from Halim Perdanakusuma International Airport in Jakarta, operated by the newly established airline FlyJaya using an ATR 72-500. The airline officially inaugurated the new route on 23 September 2025. Later that year, Wings Air inaugurated a new route between Jember and Denpasar on 5 December 2025, followed by the resumption of its Jember–Surabaya service on 1 June 2026. However, these services were short-lived, with the Jember–Denpasar route discontinued in May 2026.

== Facilities and development ==
The airport currently has a single passenger terminal measuring approximately 400 m² and equipped with basic facilities, including check-in counters, baggage claim facilities, prayer rooms, and toilets. The airport also has a car park with capacity for approximately 50 vehicles. Since 2017, the government has developed several master plans to upgrade the airport's infrastructure, including expanding the passenger terminal to approximately 1,800 m², increasing its annual passenger capacity to around 300,000. Additionally, the government plans to develop Notohadinegoro Airport as a Hajj embarkation point for pilgrims from Jember and surrounding areas travelling to Mecca. The proposed development would include the construction of supporting facilities to accommodate Hajj operations. In the future, the airport is also expected to introduce dedicated cargo services to facilitate the transportation of local products, particularly fisheries and other agricultural commodities.

On the airside, the airport has a single runway measuring 1,645 m × 30 m, which is currently capable of accommodating aircraft up to the size of the ATR 72. The airport is also equipped with a single taxiway measuring 141 m × 18 m and an apron measuring 96 m × 68 m. Under the proposed master plan, the runway is planned to be extended in two phases, with the first phase increasing its length to 2,250 meters and the second phase ultimately extending it to 2,500 meters, with the runway widened to 45 meters. The expansion would enable the airport to accommodate larger narrow-body aircraft, such as the Boeing 737 and Airbus A320. To support smooth airport operations, a new aircraft refueling facility is planned to be built at the airport with assistance from FlyJaya.

== Airlines and destinations ==
Airlines	Destinations
FlyJaya	Jakarta–Halim Perdanakusuma

== Statistics ==
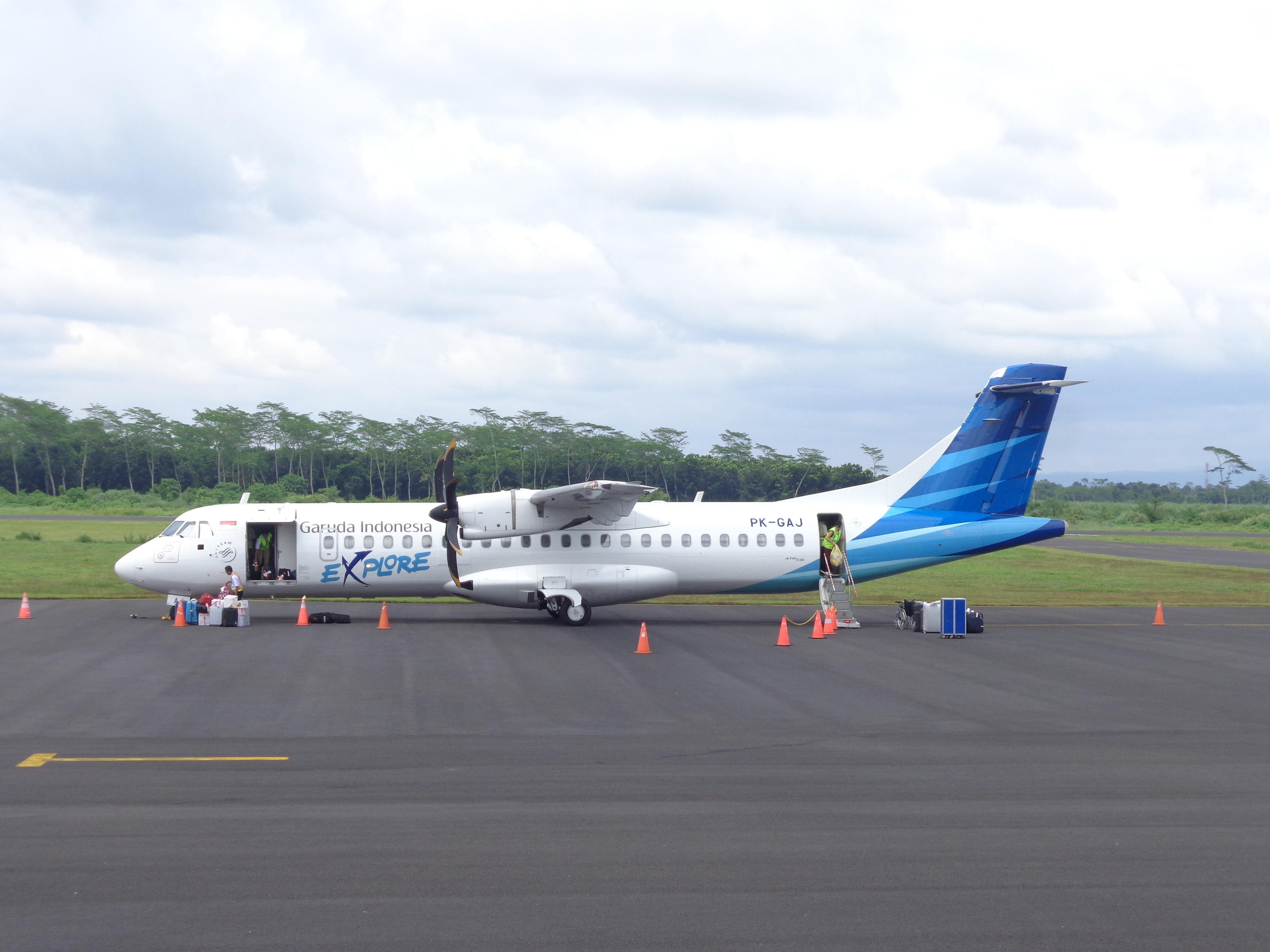
A Garuda Indonesia ATR 72-600 at Notohadinegoro Airport

Annual passenger numbers and aircraft statistics
Year	Passengers handled	Passenger % change	Cargo (tonnes)	Cargo % change	Aircraft movements	Aircraft % change
2014	N/A	Steady	N/A	Steady	N/A	Steady
2015	29,206	Steady	N/A	Steady	676	Steady
2016	41,664	▲42.66	N/A	Steady	714	▲5.62
2017	61,020	▲46.46	24.63	Steady	1,050	▲47.06
2018	77,626	▲27.21	42.58	▲72.88	1,438	▲36.95
2019	37,344	▼51.89	83.56	▲96.24	999	▼30.53
2020	5,927	▼84.13	19.55	▼76.60	176	▼82.38
2021	N/A	Steady	N/A	Steady	N/A	Steady
2022	129	Steady	N/A	Steady	5	Steady
2023	656	▲408.53	2.23	Steady	91	▲1720.00
2024	552	▼15.85	N/A	Steady	106	▲16.48
^{Source: DGCA, BPS}
