= Rampi Airport =

Rampi Airport Bandara Rampi
- IATA: RPI; ICAO: WAFK

Summary
- Airport type: Public
- Operator: Government
- Serves: Rampi
- Location: North Luwu Regency, South Sulawesi, Indonesia
- Time zone: WITA (UTC+08:00)
- Coordinates: 2°7′39″S 120°17′58″E

Map
- Location of the airport in Sulawesi

Runways
Direction	Length		Surface
Direction	ft	m	Surface
12/30	3,300	1,000	Asphalt

Statistics (2020)
- Passengers: 4,673
- Aircraft movement: 998

Rampi Airport is an airport in Rampi, North Luwu Regency, South Sulawesi, Indonesia.

== History ==
In 1979, the Central Sulawesi Christian Church sponsored the construction of a grass airstrip at Rampi, which saw its first landing in 1980 and was used until 1988. After the expiry of the initial contract with the church, the airport initially was abandoned and was reforested, until it was returned to operation with a partnership with the local government in 1990. The second operation period lasted until 1997, and the airport was again unused until 2003 when it was expanded. Subsidized pioneer flights to the airport commenced in 2006.

During its construction in 2003 and more recent works to extend the airport's runway from 1,000 to 1,500 meters, difficulty of land access to Rampi required the employment of significant manual labor by locals, such as the use of wooden carts and shovels, or hauling construction material through the mountainous access route.

== Airlines and destinations ==
Airlines	Destinations
Susi Air	Masamba, Palu
