= FlyJaya =

Regional airline of Indonesia

PT Surya Mataram Nusantara
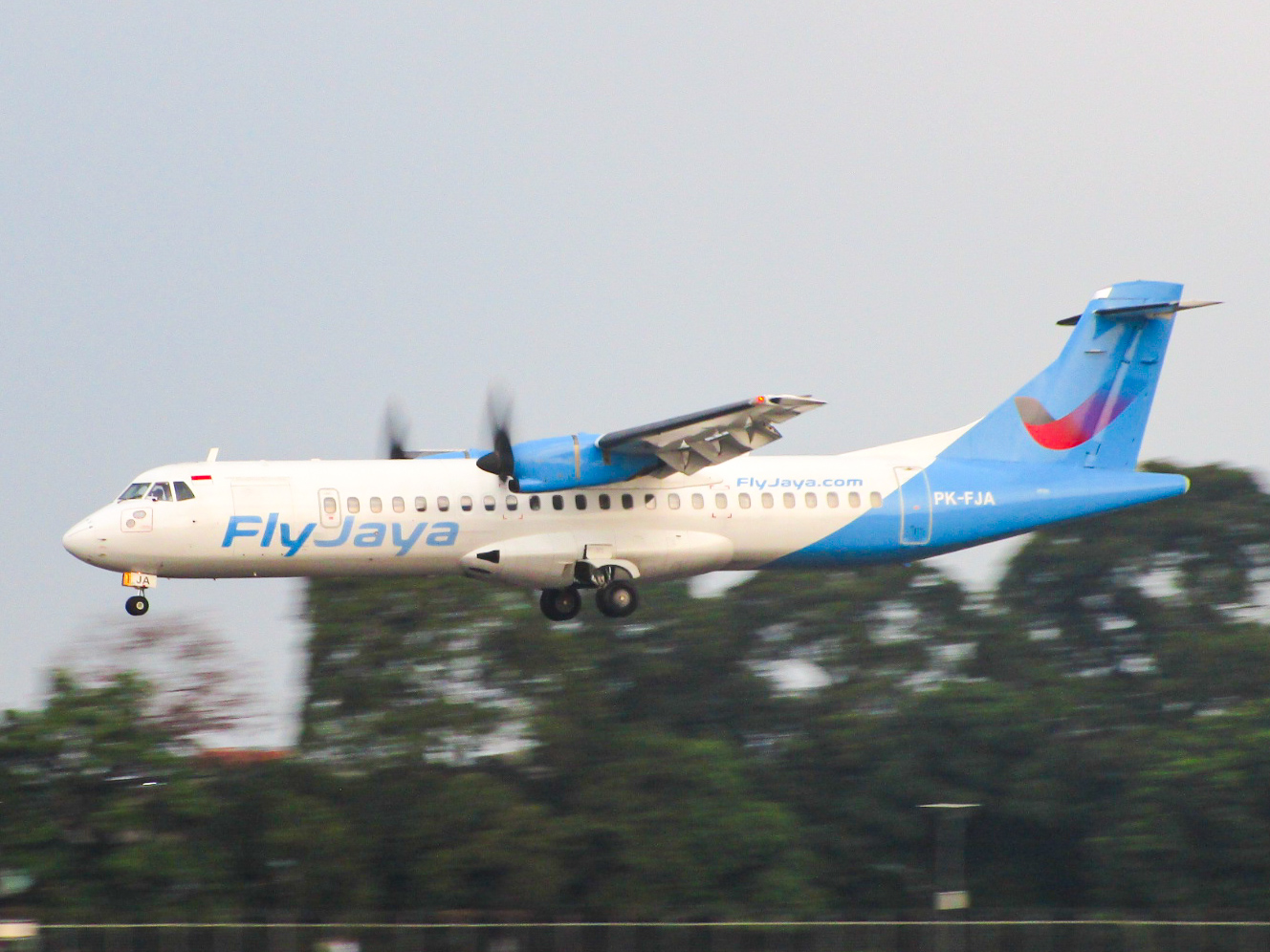
- FlyJaya ATR 72-500
IATA	ICAO	Call sign
KS	FHS	SURYA
- Founded: 9 October 2023; 2 years ago (as Surya Airways)
- Commenced operations: 3 July 2025; 14 months ago
- Operating bases: Makassar; Jakarta–Halim Perdanakusuma
- Fleet size: 3
- Destinations: 12
- Headquarters: South Jakarta, Jakarta, Indonesia
- Key people: Yudhi Fadjari (COO)
- Website: flyjaya.com

FlyJaya is a regional airline based in Jakarta, Indonesia. Originally established as Surya Airways, it was rebranded in 2024 as "FlyJaya", the airline's operations launched on 3 July 2025, with its inaugural route connecting Halim Perdanakusuma International Airport in Jakarta to Adisutjipto Airport in Yogyakarta.

FlyJaya has stated that it aims to improve air connectivity across Indonesia’s archipelago, especially to underserved cities and regions. The company's launch was backed by the government of Indonesia.

== Fleet ==
As of June 2026, FlyJaya operates the following aircraft:

FlyJaya fleet
Aircraft	In service	Orders	Passengers	Notes
ATR 72-500	2	0	72	Ex-Cebgo aircraft.
ATR 72-600	1	2	72	
Total	3	2		

== Destinations ==
As of June 2026, FlyJaya flies to the following domestic destinations; the airline plans to expand the route to Balikpapan, Bandung, Samarinda, Melak and more domestic destinations :

Country	City	Airport	Note	Ref
Indonesia	Bone	Arung Palakka Airport		
Indonesia	Jakarta	Halim Perdanakusuma International Airport	Hub	
Indonesia	Jember	Notohadinegoro Airport		
Indonesia	Kendari	Haluoleo Airport		
Indonesia	Ketapang	Rahadi Oesman Airport		
Indonesia	Makassar	Sultan Hasanuddin International Airport	Hub	
Indonesia	Masamba	Andi Jemma Airport		
Indonesia	Selayar	H. Aroeppala Airport		
Indonesia	Sorowako	Sorowako Airport		
Indonesia	Tana Toraja	Tana Toraja		
Indonesia	Wakatobi	Matahora Airport		
Indonesia	Yogyakarta	Adisutjipto Airport		
