= Sorowako Airport =

Sorowako Airport Bandar Udara Sorowako
- IATA: SQR; ICAO: WAWS

Summary
- Airport type: Public
- Owner: Vale Indonesia
- Operator: Government
- Serves: Sorowako
- Location: East Luwu Regency, South Sulawesi, Sulawesi Island, Indonesia
- Time zone: WITA (UTC+08:00)
- Elevation AMSL: 423 m (1,388 ft)
- Coordinates: 02°31′52.33″S 121°21′27.50″E

Map
- Location of the airport in Sulawesi

Runways
Direction	Length		Surface
Direction	m	ft	Surface
12/30	1,199	3,933	Asphalt

Sorowako Airport is an airport in Sorowako, Indonesia. In 2016, the government decided to lengthen the runway from 1,050m to 1,350m so that the airport could accommodate ATR 72s.

== Airlines and destinations ==
Airlines	Destinations
FlyJaya	Makassar
Pelita Air	Charter: Makassar
