= Sultan Hasanuddin International Airport =

Airport serving Makassar, South Sulawesi, Indonesia

Sultan Hasanuddin International Airport Bandar Udara Internasional Sultan Hasanuddin

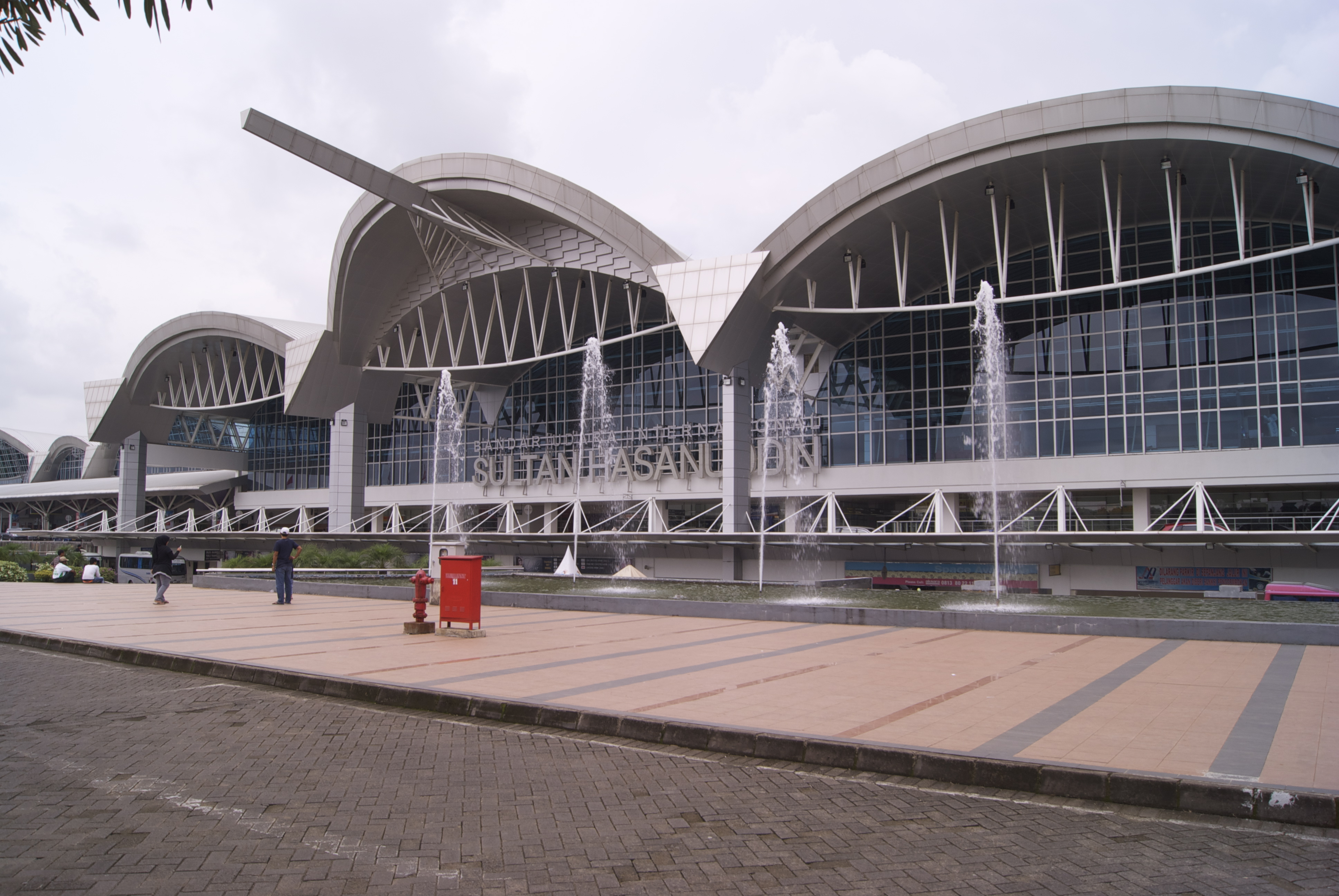
- IATA: UPG; ICAO: WAAA; WMO: 97180

Summary
- Airport type: Public / Military
- Owner: Government of Indonesia
- Operator: InJourney Airports
- Serves: Makassar
- Location: Maros Regency, South Sulawesi
- Opened: 27 September 1937; 89 years ago
- Hub for: Batik Air; Garuda Indonesia; Lion Air
- Focus city for: FlyJaya; Sriwijaya Air
- Operating base for: Citilink; Super Air Jet; Wings Air
- Time zone: WITA (UTC+08:00)
- Elevation AMSL: 47 ft (14 m)
- Coordinates: 5°03′42″S 119°33′15″E
- Website: www.hasanuddin-airport.co.id

Maps
- Sulawesi region in Indonesia

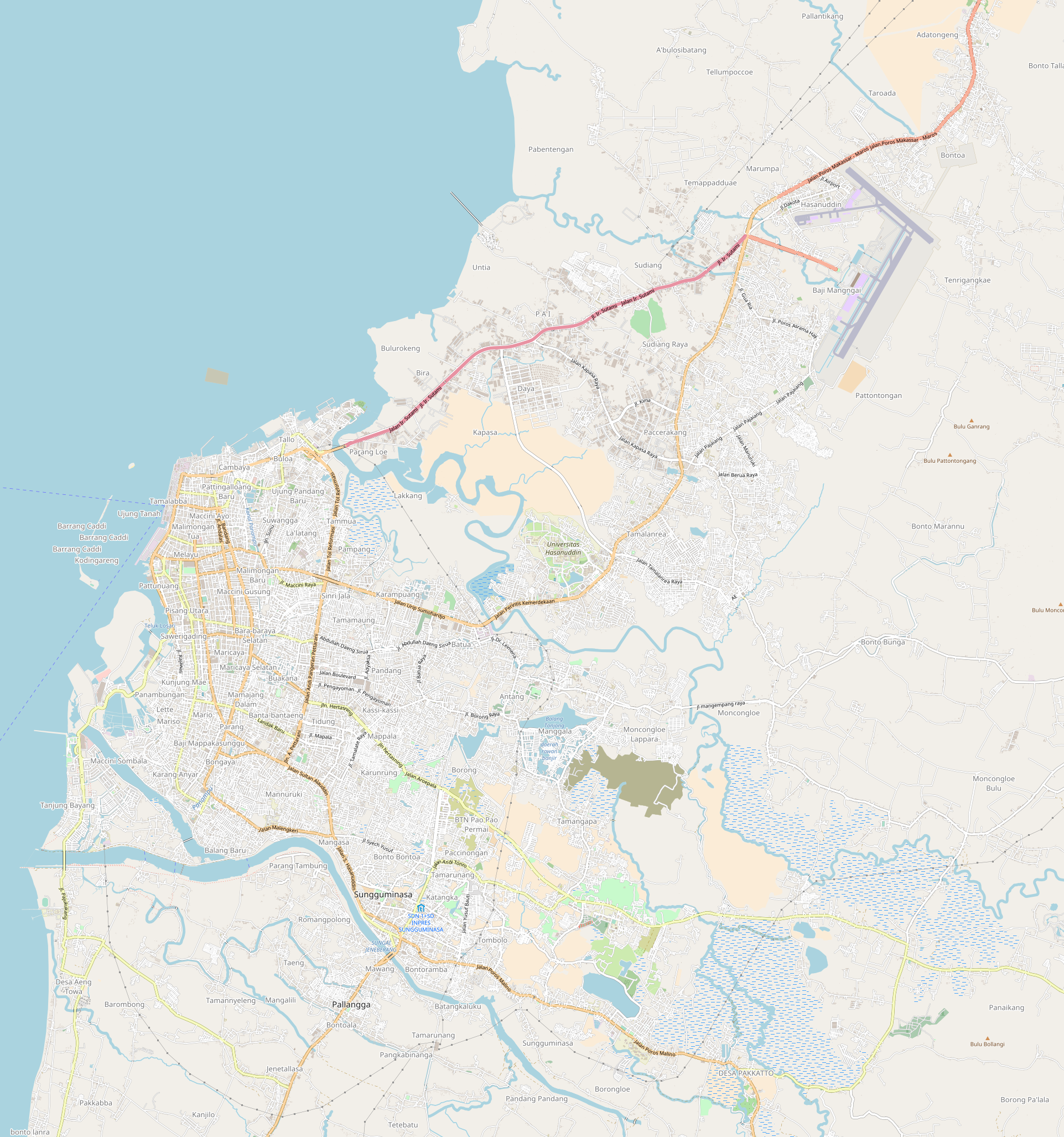
- Location in Makassar Location in Sulawesi Location in Indonesia Location in Southeast Asia

Runways
Direction	Length		Surface
Direction	m	ft	Surface
13/31	2,500	8,202	Asphalt
03/21	3,202	10,505	Asphalt

Statistics (2024)
- Passengers: 9,712,834 (▼7.7%)
- Cargo (tonnes): 96,309 (▲20.6%)
- Aircraft movements: 72,939 (▼11.5%)
- Source: DGCA

Sultan Hasanuddin International Airport (IATA: UPG, ICAO: WAAA) is an international airport serving Makassar, South Sulawesi, Indonesia. The airport is located on the border between Makassar and Maros, a suburb in South Sulawesi, approximately 20 km (12 mi) or 15 minutes from Makassar city center via the freeway/tollway, and about 23 km (14 mi) or 20 minutes via the highway. Named after Sultan Hasanuddin (1631–1670), the Sultan of Gowa and a national hero of Indonesia who resisted the Dutch East India Company in the 1660s, the airport serves as the main gateway to eastern Indonesia and is a major aviation hub in the region. It is the largest airport in eastern Indonesia and one of only three international airports in Sulawesi. The airport serves as a key hub connecting western and eastern Indonesia, offering domestic flights to major cities in western Indonesia such as Jakarta, Surabaya, Denpasar, and Balikpapan, as well as destinations in eastern Indonesia, including Ambon, Ternate, Sorong, and Jayapura. It also provides international connections to destinations such as Singapore and Malaysia. Additionally, the airport is one of the primary embarkation points for Hajj pilgrims from eastern Indonesia, with seasonal flights to Jeddah and Medina.

In addition to serving as a commercial airport, Sultan Hasanuddin International Airport also hosts the Sultan Hasanuddin Air Force Base, a Type-A facility operated by the Indonesian Air Force. It is one of the largest air force bases in eastern Indonesia and is home to four Air Force squadrons: the 5th Reconnaissance Squadron, which operates Boeing 737-200 and CN 235-220 aircraft; the 11th Combat Squadron, equipped with Sukhoi Su-27 and Su-30 fighter jets; the 33rd Transport Squadron, which flies Lockheed C-130H Hercules aircraft; and the 044th Engineering Squadron.

== History ==
=== Colonial era ===
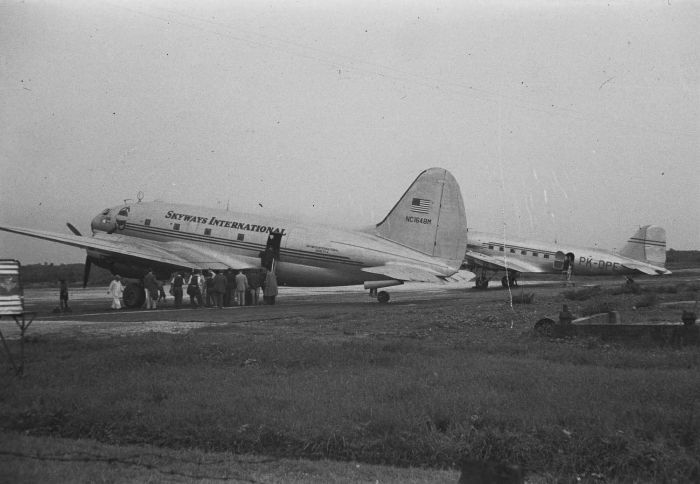
A Curtiss C-46 Commando at Mandai Airfield, 1948

Sultan Hasanuddin International Airport was first built by the Dutch colonial government in 1935 and was originally known as Kadieng Airfield. After approximately two years of construction, the Dutch government officially opened the airport on 27 September 1937, marked by a commercial flight connecting Singapore using a Douglas DC-2 aircraft operated by the Koninklijke Nederlands Indische Luchtvaart Maatschappij (KNILM). At the time of its inauguration, the airfield had only a single grass runway measuring 1,600 × 45 meters.

The airfield was considered strategically important by the Japanese during the opening phase of the Pacific Theater of World War II, as it enabled them to launch air offensives against targets in Java. Around midnight on 8–9 February 1942, Japanese troops landed in Makassar. Realizing the hopelessness of the situation, the Dutch commander in Sulawesi, Colonel M. Vooren, based his defensive strategy on the Malayan campaign. His objective was to inflict the greatest possible losses on the enemy while delaying their advance for as long as possible. To achieve this, he abandoned the conventional doctrine of direct coastal defence in favour of an indirect defensive strategy: slowing the enemy advance to facilitate the planned destruction of Mandai Airfield, before making a final stand at the Tjamba position in the mountainous interior. The entire plan was purely defensive. The city and the destroyed airfield were occupied by Japanese forces around noon on 9 February 1942. The Japanese later rebuilt the airfield during their occupation from 1942 to 1945, including upgrading its grass runway to a concrete surface. The rehabilitation work involved Allied prisoners of war, who were subjected to harsh treatment by their captors. Some Allied prisoners were executed by Japanese forces throughout the occupation, continuing until the end of the war. During this period, the airfield was renamed Mandai Airfield. Throughout the war, the airfield was repeatedly targeted by Allied air raids. By the end of the war, the airfield was in poor condition due to Allied bombing, with the runway heavily cratered. It was subsequently repaired by Australian and Indian engineers, after which Allied forces extended the runway to 1,745 × 45 meters. The construction involved approximately 4,000 workers, including former Japanese prisoners of war.

With the end of the war, the airfield was handed over to the returning Dutch authorities. It was subsequently used as an airbase by the Royal Netherlands East Indies Army Air Force (ML-KNIL) during the Indonesian National Revolution until 1950. During the Makassar Uprising in April 1950, negotiations were held at the airfield between Martinus Putuhena, Prime Minister of the State of East Indonesia; Colonel Alex Kawilarang of the Indonesian Army; and Major General Schaffelaar of the Royal Netherlands East Indies Army (KNIL), in an effort to end the uprising by disgruntled former KNIL soldiers.

=== Post-independence era ===
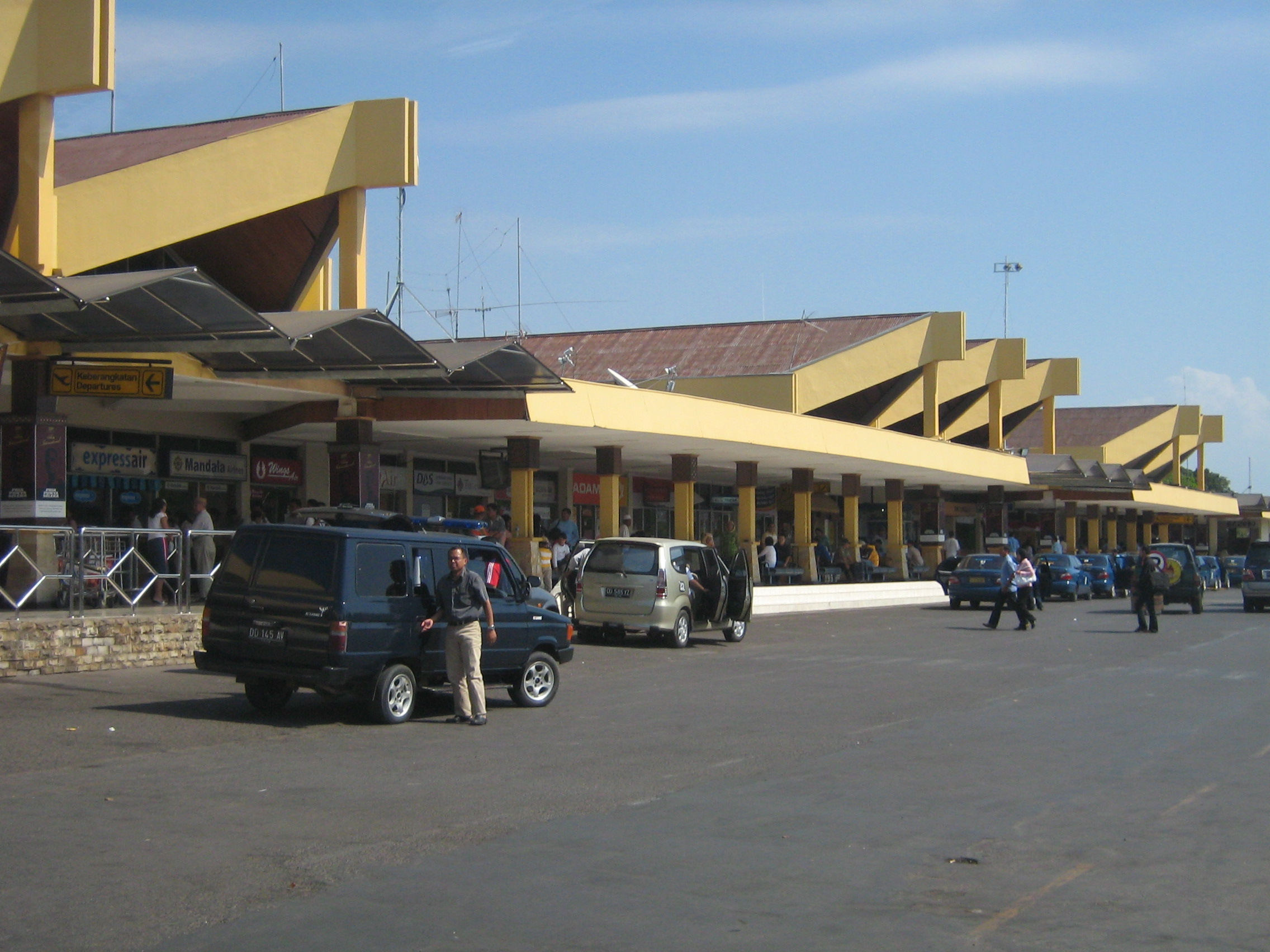
Exterior of the former terminal, which was destroyed by fire in 2016

Following the Dutch recognition of Indonesia's sovereignty, Dutch forces withdrew from Makassar, and control of the airfield was transferred from the ML-KNIL to the Indonesian Air Force on 2 June 1950. Its operation and maintenance were initially jointly managed by the Indonesian Air Force and the Airfield Division of the Department of Public Work. During this period, the airport became one of the busiest in the country, serving as a vital link between western and eastern Indonesia. In 1955, the airport's management was transferred to the Civil Aviation Service, now known as the Directorate General of Civil Aviation. The runway was subsequently extended to 2,345 × 45 meters. The airfield was bombed on 13 April 1958 by U.S.-supplied Douglas A-26 Invader aircraft operated by the Permesta Air Force (AUREV), based in North Sulawesi, during the height of the Permesta rebellion.

In 1962, an assassination attempt on President Sukarno, who was visiting Makassar, was carried out at the airfield by the Darul Islam movement led by Abdul Kahar Muzakkar. Mortars were fired at his motorcade as it exited Mandai Airfield; fortunately, the rounds missed by a considerable margin.

In 1980, the airport was renamed to its present name in honor of Sultan Hasanuddin, the 17th-century ruler of the Gowa Sultanate who famously resisted Dutch colonial forces in South Sulawesi. The renaming coincided with a runway extension from 1,745 × 45 meters to 2,400 × 45 meters. The following year, the airport began serving as a Hajj embarkation point, operating regular flights on the Makassar–Jeddah route to accommodate pilgrims traveling to Mecca. Sultan Hasanuddin Airport experienced a significant rise in passenger traffic and international arrivals after the issuance of Minister of Transportation Decree No. KM 61/1994 on 30 October 1994, which officially granted it international status. The airport's first regular international route was inaugurated on 28 March 1995 with the launch of the Makassar–Kuala Lumpur service by Malaysia Airlines, followed soon after by SilkAir’s route to Singapore. However, between 28 October 2006 and mid-2008, all international routes to Makassar were temporarily suspended after Garuda Indonesia closed the Makassar–Singapore route due to substantial financial losses. This decision mirrored the earlier moves by Malaysia Airlines and SilkAir, both of which had also discontinued their services to Makassar. International service resumed shortly afterwards.

Following the opening of the new terminal in 2008, located 2 km from the old terminal, the latter was closed to the public and repurposed for use by the Indonesian Air Force. On 15 August 2016, the old terminal building was destroyed in a major fire.

This airport has earned recognition as one of the top three airports in Indonesia, winning awards in 2011 for excellence in service and having the cleanest toilets. In 2012, it received the highest honor from the Ministry of Transportation, winning the Airport Award as the best airport.

== Facilities and development ==
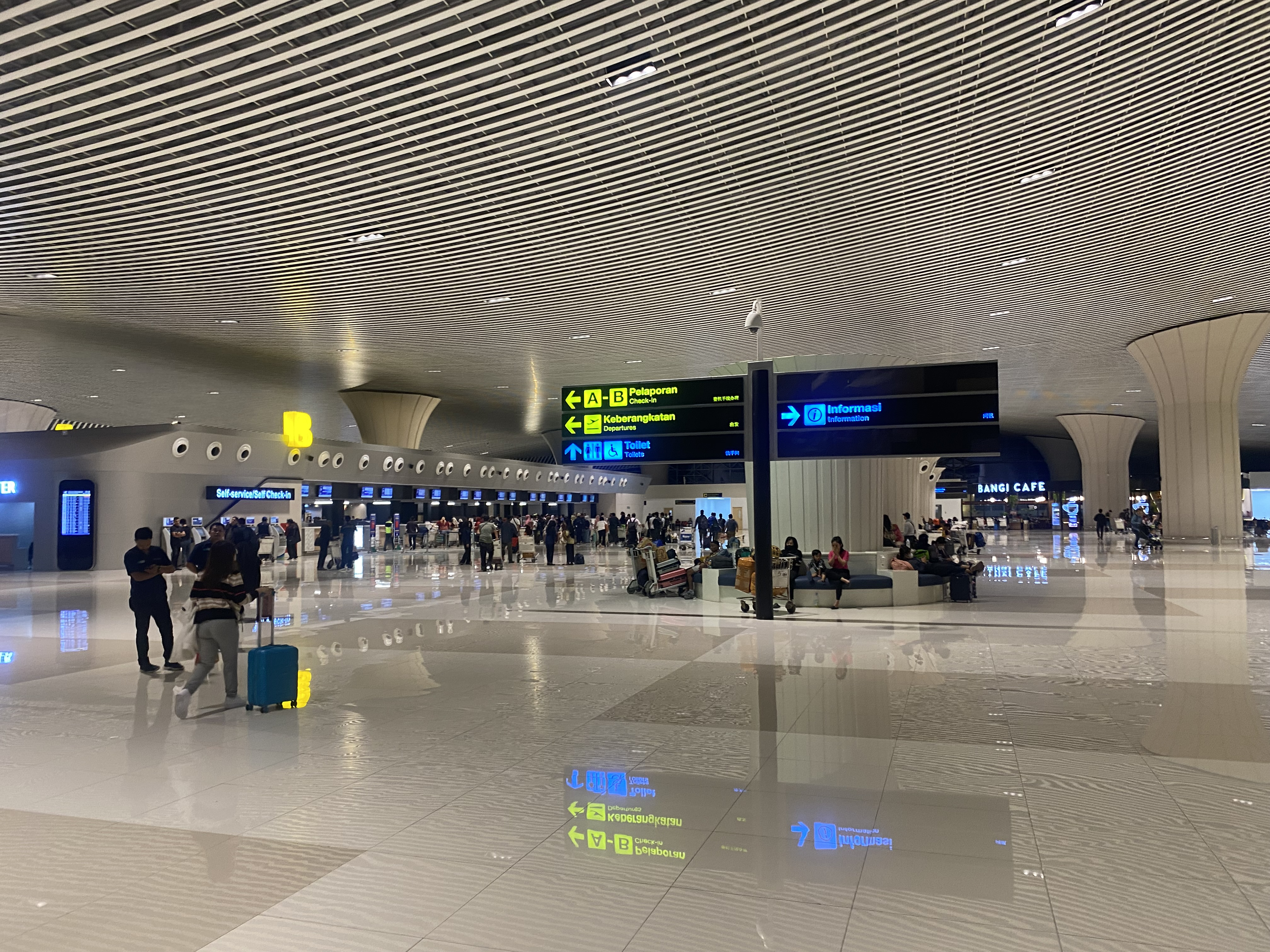
Check-in area after the 2024 expansion

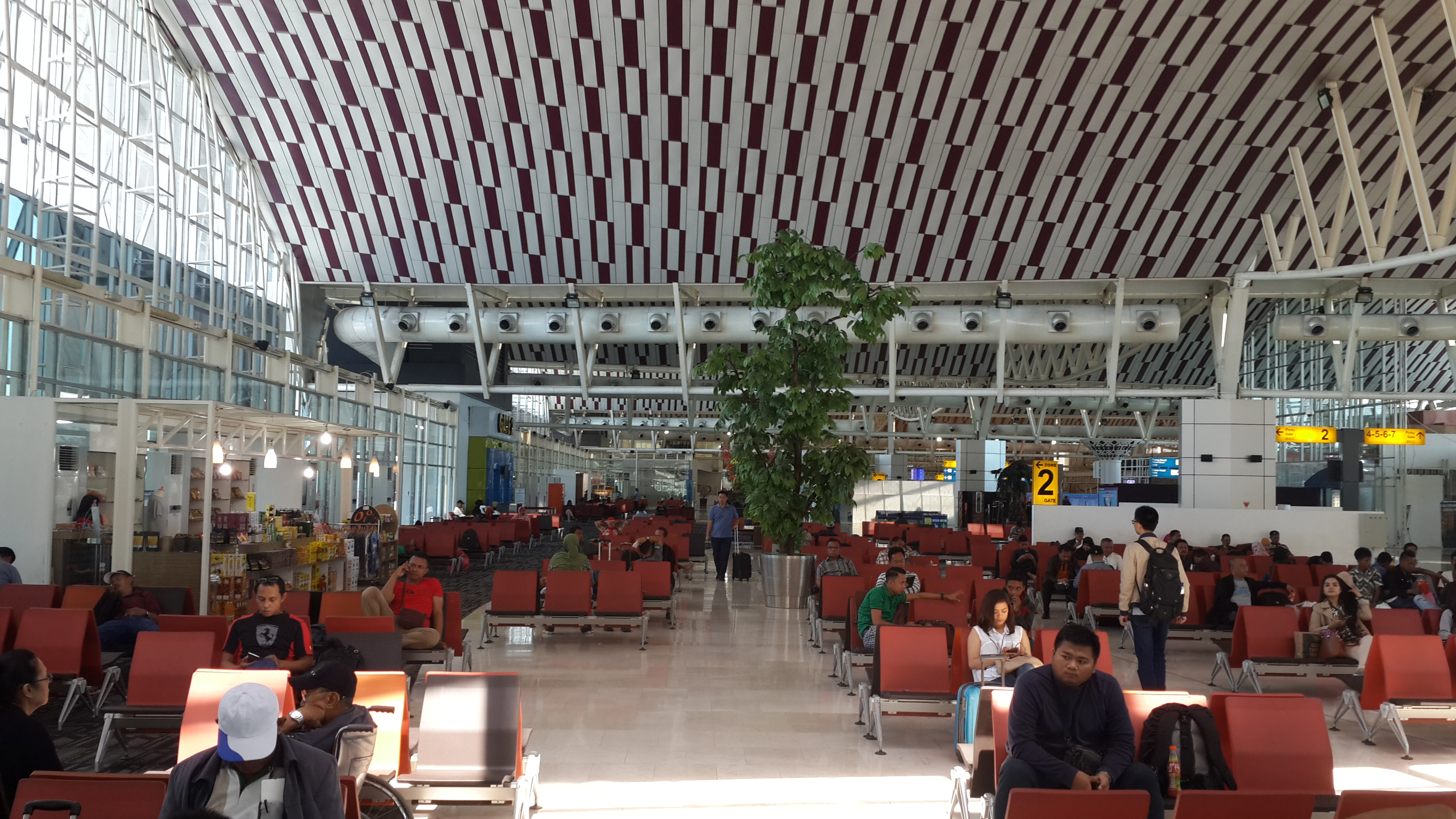
Boarding gate

The current terminal, located approximately 2 kilometers south of the old facility, began operations on 4 August 2008 and was officially inaugurated by President Susilo Bambang Yudhoyono on 26 September 2008. Construction, which started in 2004, took around four years to complete. The project was carried out together with the 11.47 kilometer extension of the Ujung Pandang Tollway, improving access between the airport, Makassar city center, and the Port of Makassar. It also included the construction of a new runway measuring 3,100 by 45 meters. The airport building features a futuristic architectural style, dominated by glass wall elements and complemented by ornaments from South Sulawesi. The ten roof arches are interpreted as waves, symbolizing the spirit of the Bugis and Makassar people, who are known worldwide as resilient seafarers. A traditional Bugis Phinisi ship is depicted on the main arch pillars, while the terminal ceiling incorporates motifs inspired by Mandar embroidered textiles. It is five times larger than the previous terminal and has a capacity of seven million passengers per year. By 2010, it was already serving five million passengers. The terminal includes six aerobridges and a significantly larger apron that can accommodate up to seventeen wide-body aircraft. The total cost for the terminal and supporting infrastructure was approximately more than 600 billion rupiah.

Due to overcapacity, with approximately 10.7 million passengers passing through the airport in 2019 despite its original design for only 7 million, a major expansion project was launched in 2019. The project aimed to boost the airport's annual capacity to 15.5 million passengers and to triple the terminal's size from 50,000 to 150,000 square meters. The expansion was divided into two main components. The first included the revitalization of the existing terminal, a southern extension, the construction of a multi-level parking facility, and improvements to the main access road. The second involved the development of new aircraft aprons on the southern and eastern sides of the airport, along with supporting infrastructure. As part of the project, the apron was expanded to accommodate 37 aircraft stands, up from 34, and the parking area was enlarged from 40 to 72 square meters. The number of jet bridges at the airport was increased from six to twelve. The total cost of the expansion was estimated at 2.4 trillion rupiah. Originally slated for completion in 2021, the project was delayed and was briefly halted due to the COVID-19 pandemic, with construction resuming in 2023. The expanded terminal was completed and officially opened to the public on 26 June 2024.

The airport is planned to undergo further expansion in four phases. The first phase has been completed and became operational in 2024. Phase II was originally scheduled to begin in 2024, increasing the airport's passenger capacity to 21 million per year and expanding the number of parking stands to 47. Phase III, set to commence in 2034, will raise the terminal capacity to 30.8 million passengers annually with 64 parking stands. Finally, Phase IV will begin in 2044, bringing the terminal's ultimate capacity to 40 million passengers per year and 78 parking stands.

== Airlines and destinations ==
=== Passenger ===
Airlines	Destinations
AirAsia	Kuala Lumpur–International
Airfast Indonesia	Charter: Jakarta–Soekarno-Hatta, Timika
Batik Air	Ambon, Balikpapan, Denpasar, Jakarta–Soekarno-Hatta, Jayapura, Kendari, Luwuk, Manado, Palu, Surabaya, Timika
Citilink	Balikpapan, Denpasar, Jakarta–Soekarno-Hatta, Jayapura, Surabaya, Yogyakarta–International; Seasonal: Jeddah, Medina
Flyadeal	Seasonal: Jeddah
FlyJaya	Bone, Masamba, Selayar
Garuda Indonesia	Jakarta–Soekarno-Hatta, Kendari, Palu; Seasonal: Jeddah, Medina
Lion Air	Ambon, Balikpapan, Banjarmasin, Biak, Denpasar, Gorontalo, Jakarta–Soekarno-Hatta, Jayapura, Kendari, Kupang, Lombok, Manado, Manokwari, Merauke, Palu, Semarang, Sorong, Surabaya, Ternate, Timika, Yogyakarta–International; Seasonal: Jeddah, Medina
Malaysia Airlines	Kuala Lumpur–International
NAM Air	Jakarta–Soekarno-Hatta, Surabaya
Pelita Air	Jakarta–Soekarno-Hatta; Charter: Sorowako
Saudia	Seasonal: Jeddah, Medina
Scoot	Singapore
Sriwijaya Air	Denpasar, Jakarta–Soekarno-Hatta, Jayapura, Kolaka, Morowali, Nabire, Palu, Sorong, Surabaya, Tanjung Redeb, Ternate, Timika, Yogyakarta–International
Super Air Jet	Balikpapan, Bandung–Husein Sastranegara (begins 16 December 2026), Manokwari, Tarakan (Note: Tarakan is the continuation of Balikpapan flight, operating under the same flight number.)
TransNusa	Manado
Wings Air	Batulicin, Bau-Bau, Bima, Kolaka, Labuan Bajo, Mamuju, Maumere, Morowali, Palopo, Tana Toraja

== Traffic ==
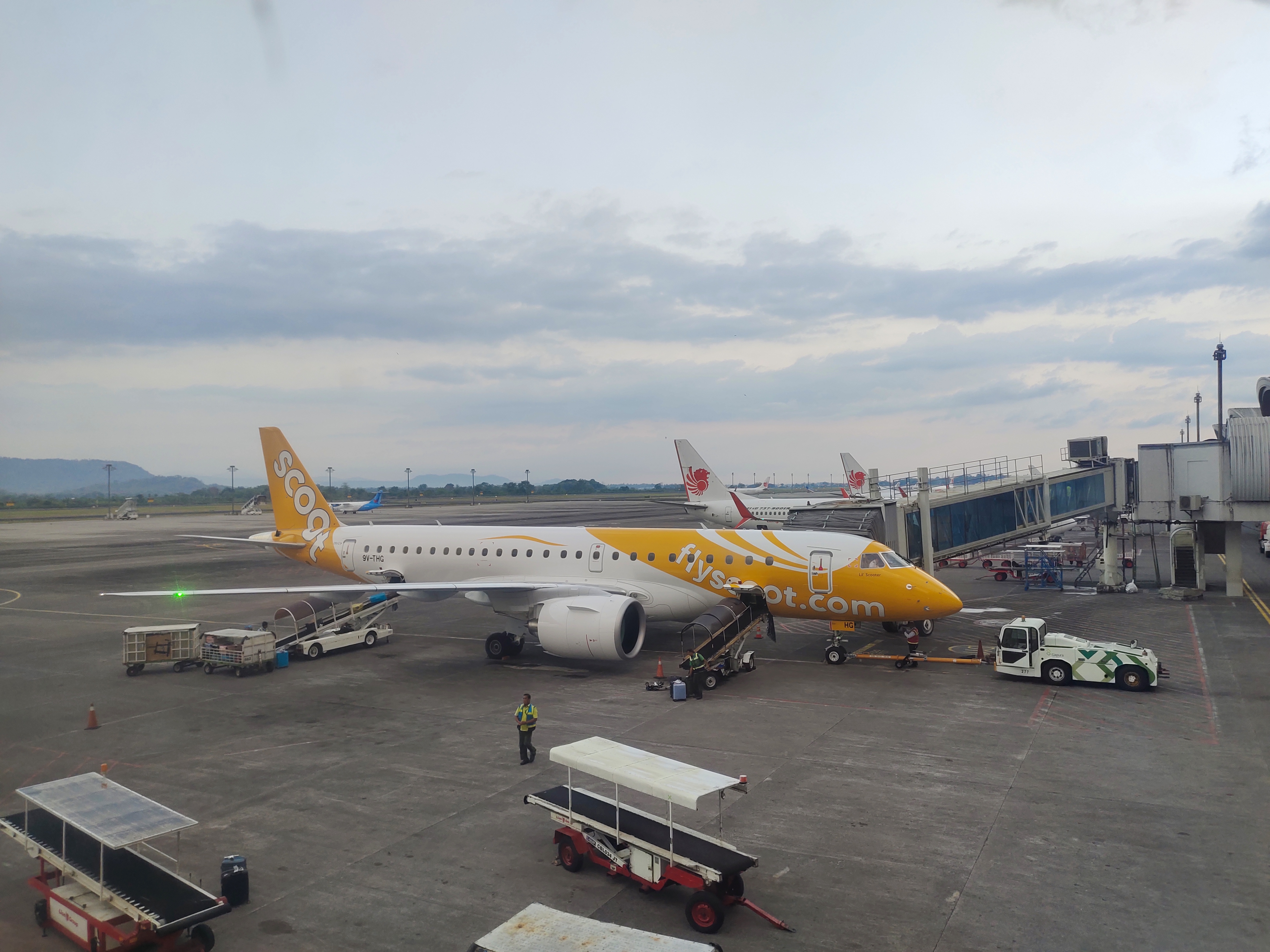
Scoot Embraer E190-E2 and Lion Air Boeing 737s aircraft lining up at Sultan Hasanuddin International Airport

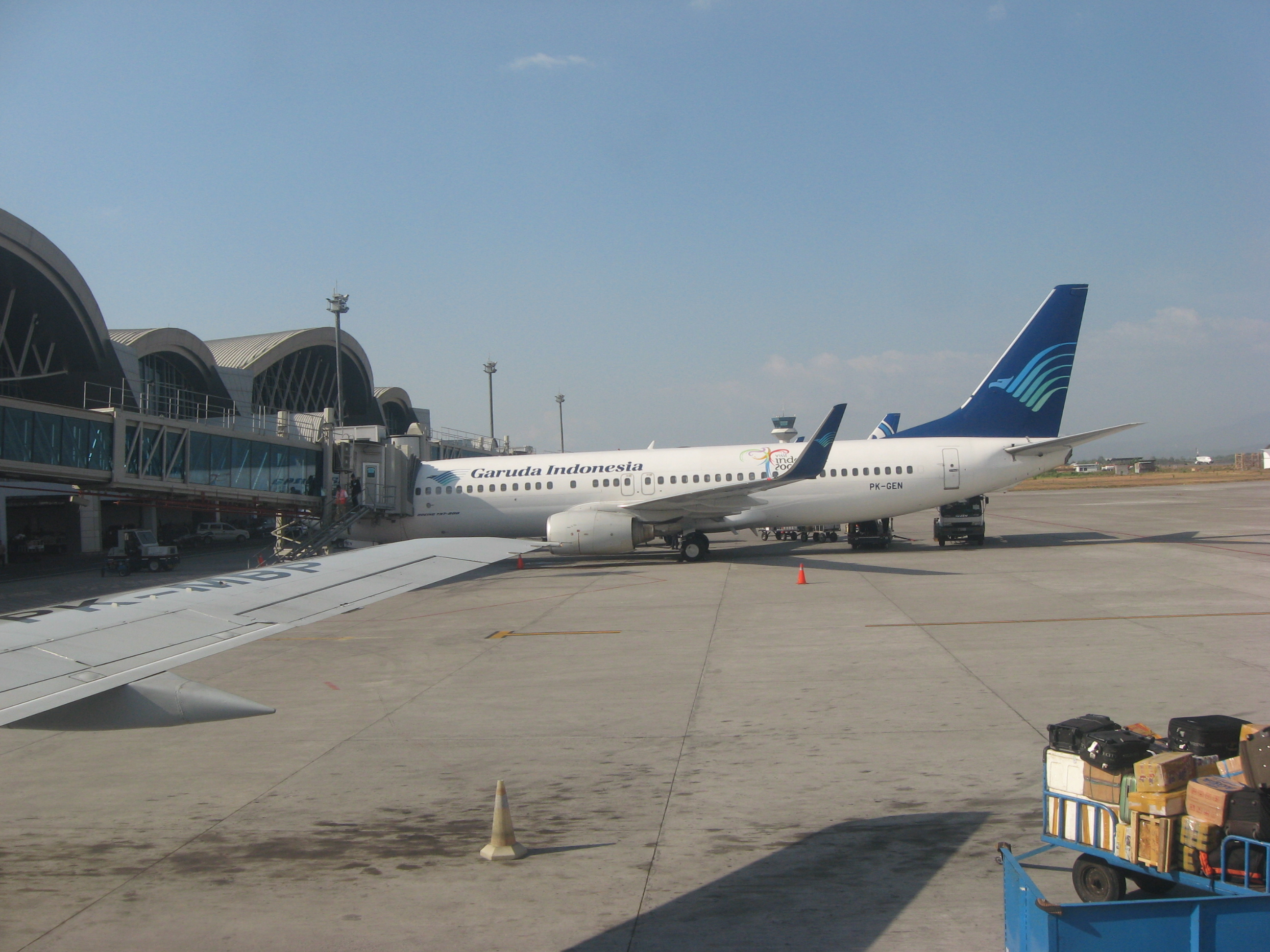
A Garuda Indonesia Boeing 737-800 at Sultan Hasanuddin International Airport, 2009

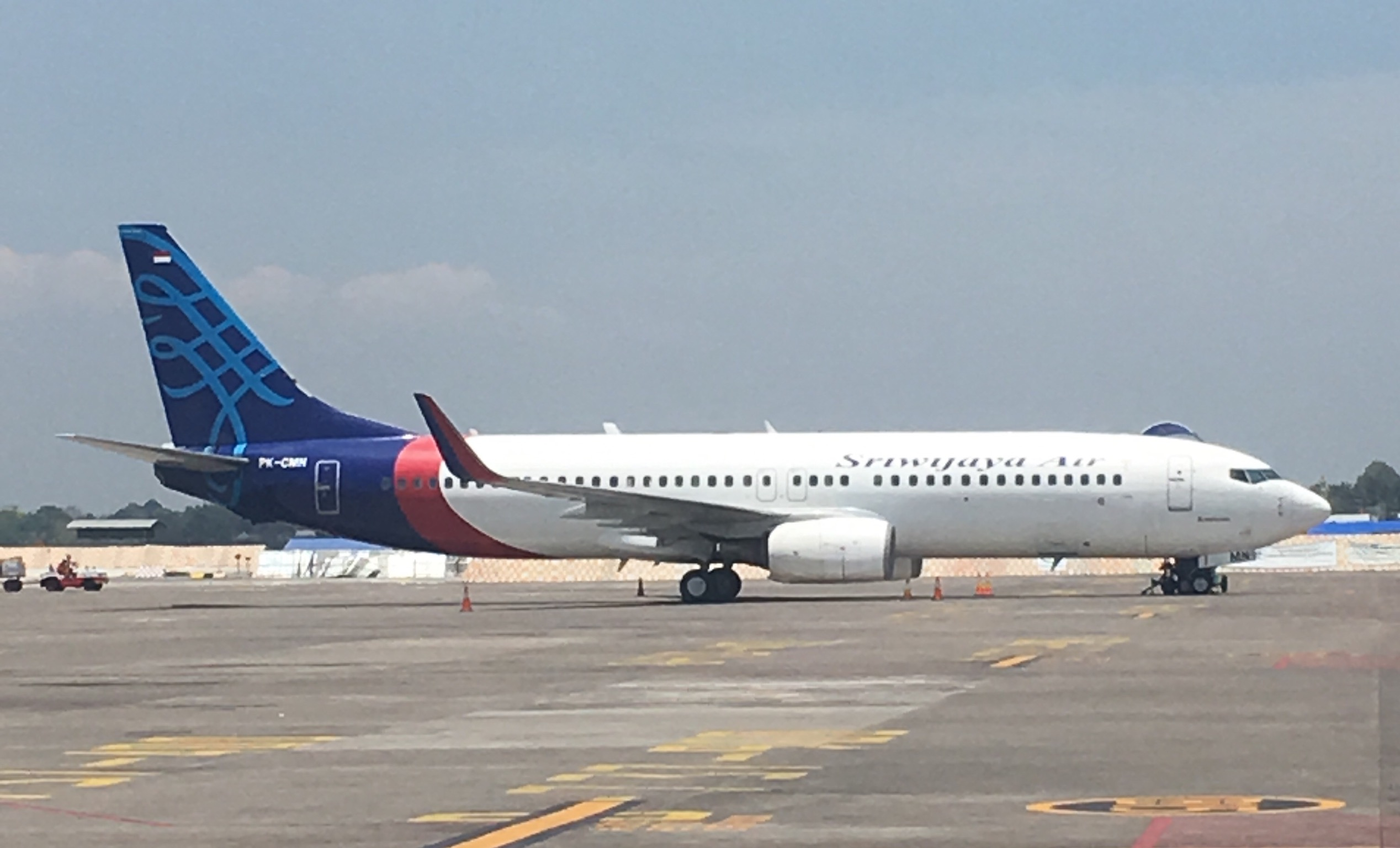
A Sriwijaya Air Boeing 737-800 at Sultan Hasanuddin International Airport

Annual passenger numbers and aircraft statistics
Year	Passengers handled	Passenger % change	Cargo (tonnes)	Cargo % change	Aircraft movements	Aircraft % change
2002	1,815,226	Steady	23,886	Steady	29,897	Steady
2003	2,641,653	▲45.5	26,214	▲9.7	39,409	▲31.8
2004	3,443,131	▲30.3	27,700	▲5.7	44,440	▲12.8
2005	3,610,276	▲4.9	32,353	▲16.8	43,109	▼3.0
2006	3,987,810	▲10.5	38,338	▲18.5	45,136	▲4.7
2007	4,469,430	▲12.1	31,605	▼17.6	48,848	▲8.2
2008	4,952,449	▲10.8	33,279	▲5.3	55,781	▲14.2
2009	5,063,860	▲2.2	32,420	▼2.6	51,481	▼7.7
2010	6,546,831	▲29.3	40,142	▲23.8	64,908	▲26.1
2011	9,255,297	▲41.4	43,343	▲8.0	73,131	▲12.7
2012	10,637,676	▲14.9	49,698	▲14.7	82,680	▲13.1
2013	9,645,504	▼9.3	53,550	▲7.8	94,767	▲14.6
2014	9,848,354	▲2.1	53,563	▲0.02	83,551	▼11.8
2015	9,306,184	▼5.5	53,935	▲0.7	88,592	▲6.0
2016	10,756,737	▲15.6	57,898	▲7.3	100,630	▲13.6
2017	12,294,962	▲14.3	68,861	▲18.9	113,911	▲13.2
2018	13,537,469	▲10.1	76,131	▲10.6	118,538	▲4.1
2019	10,759,155	▼20.5	53,009	▼30.4	97,907	▼17.4
2020	6,097,074	▼43.3	66,259	▲25.0	64,930	▼33.7
2021	6,656,741	▲9.2	78,825	▲19.0	67,467	▲3.9
2022	9,716,893	▲46.0	82,644	▲4.8	78,093	▲15.7
2023	10,517,586	▲8.2	79,879	▼3.3	82,439	▲5.6
2024	9,712,834	▼7.7	96,309	▲20.6	72,939	▼11.5
^{Source: DGCA, BPS}

== Ground transport ==
=== Bus ===
Perum DAMRI operates a bus service from Sultan Hasanuddin International Airport to Tanjung Bira Beach in Bulukumba Regency. The route is: Sultan Hasanuddin International Airport – DAMRI Daya Pool ticket office – Toddopuli Road – Cappa Bongayya Terminal – Gowa Regency – Takalar Regency – Jeneponto Regency – Bantaeng Regency – Bulukumba Regency – Tanjung Bira. The service operates daily from both Sultan Hasanuddin International Airport and Tanjung Bira at 20:00 WITA. The journey covers a distance of approximately 205 kilometres, with an estimated travel time of more than five hours. The fare is Rp 200,000.

The local bus rapid transit system, Trans Sulsel, also serves the airport. Corridor 2, which connects Hasanuddin University and Mandai Railway Station, includes a stop at the airport terminal.

=== Car and taxi ===
Taxi and shuttle services are available through several companies.

=== Pete-pete ===
A lower-cost public transport option between Sultan Hasanuddin International Airport and Makassar city center is available via angkutan kota (angkot), locally known as pete-pete. Access to this mode of transport requires exiting the airport premises to Jalan Perintis Kemerdekaan. The distance between the terminal and the airport exit is considerable on foot; however, a free shuttle bus operated at the airport is available for this transfer.

From the airport exit, pete-pete services operate toward Daya Terminal, where transfers to other routes bound for the city center are required. The standard fare per pete-pete journey is approximately Rp4,000, resulting in a total cost of around Rp8,000 for travel between the airport and the city center. This option is generally more economical than taxi services and Damri airport buses, although it involves multiple transfers between vehicles.

== Accidents and incidents ==
- 31 October 2003, Lion Air Flight 787, MD-82 Ambon-Makassar-Denpasar route, derailed while landing at the airport.
- 3 February 2005, Lion Air flight 791, MD-82 Ambon-Makassar route derailed while landing at the airport.
- 6 May 2005, Lion Air Flight 778, MD-82 on the Jakarta-Makassar route, a tire burst while landing at the airport. There were no fatalities in the accident case.
- Lion Air with flight 792, MD-82 on the Jakarta-Makassar-Gorontalo route on 24 December 2005, the plane's wheels slipped off the runway while landing at the airport.
- On 24 December 2006, a Boeing 737-400 with flight number 792, PK-LIJ for the Jakarta-Makassar-Gorontalo route skidded while landing at the airport.
- 18 January, Lion Air's MD-82 aircraft on the Ambon-Makassar-Surabaya route skidded while landing at the airport.
- Wings Air aircraft flight number IW-1205 skidded on Runway 03-21 while landing at around 16.30 WITA. The ATR 72-500 aircraft departed from Pomala, Southeast Sulawesi, with the aim of Makassar carrying 73 passengers: 53 men, 17 women, one child and two babies. "All passengers are safe"
- On 25 September 2014, a Sriwijaya Air Boeing 737 made a hard landing and four tyres blew up. No casualties occurred.
- On 2 June 2015, a Garuda Indonesia Boeing 737-800 overran the runway on landing at the airport. No casualties occurred.
- On 1 July 2020, a Garuda Indonesia type Airbus A330-300 aircraft with registration number PK-GHD serving the Makassar (UPG) - Jakarta (CGK) route with flight number GA-613 experienced an incident (derailed) on Runway 21, the aircraft was carrying 14 passengers and 12 crew members. There were no casualties from the incident.
- On 17 February 2021, a Garuda Indonesia Boeing 737-800 aircraft registered with PK-GFF returned to the airport after taking off with flight GA-642 to the destination. Gorontalo, after reporting engine failure; the engine, the right of the plane or engine number 2, black smoke came out. The aircraft landed safely and no injuries were reported, but the aircraft suffered the aforementioned engine failure.
- On 18 May 2022, the Lion Air Boeing 737-900ER aircraft registered PK-LHR for the Surabaya-Makassar route had to be diverted after the JT-800 aircraft hit a bird or bird strike while heading to Sultan Hasanuddin Makassar International Airport in Maros, South Sulawesi (UPG).
- On 30 September 2022, Sriwijaya Air aircraft flight number SJ567 made an emergency landing at the airport after experiencing left engine trouble. The damage occurred when the plane was en route from Makassar to Surabaya. All 177 passengers and crew survived.
- On 15 May 2024, a Boeing 747-400 leased from Terra Avia, operating as Flight 1105 suffered an engine fire after departure from the airport, the aircraft landed back safely, All 450 passengers and 18 crew members survived.
- On 24 August 2026, a Sukhoi fighter jet of the Indonesian Air Force overshot the airport's runway before coming to rest in a grassy, sloped area.

== See also ==
- List of airports in Indonesia
- List of airlines of Indonesia
