= Haluoleo Airport =

Haluoleo Airport Bandar Udara Haluoleo
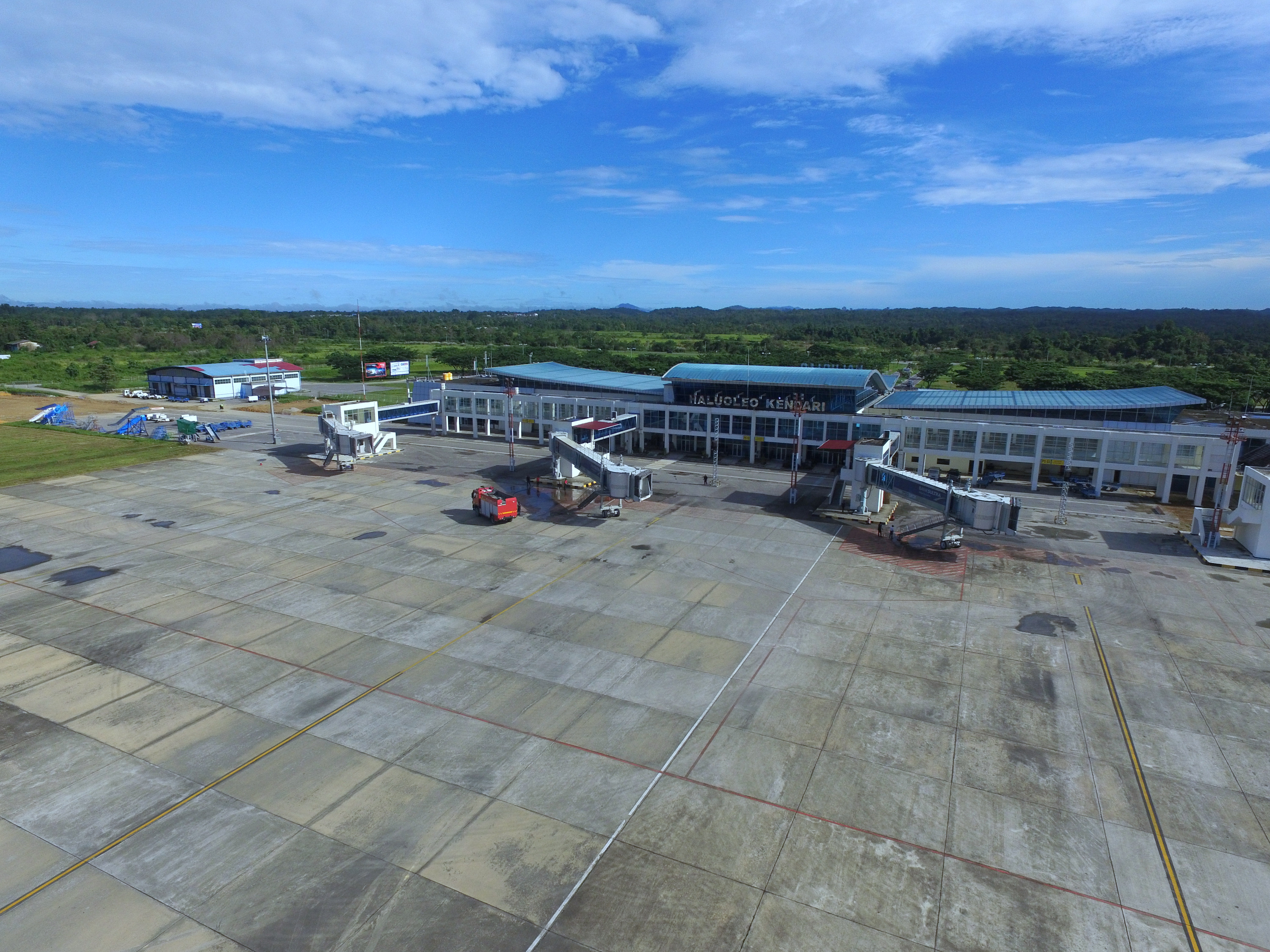
- IATA: KDI; ICAO: WAWW; WMO: 97146

Summary
- Airport type: Public / Military
- Owner: Government of Indonesia
- Operator: Directorate General of Civil Aviation
- Serves: Kendari
- Location: Ranomeeto, South Konawe Regency, Southeast Sulawesi, Sulawesi, Indonesia
- Built: 1938; 88 years ago
- Time zone: WITA (UTC+08:00)
- Elevation AMSL: 538 ft (164 m)
- Coordinates: 4°4′53.79″S 122°25′05.63″E
- Website: www.haluoleoairport.com

Maps
- Sulawesi region in Indonesia

- Location within Sulawesi Location within Indonesia

Runways
Direction	Length		Surface
Direction	ft	m	Surface
08/26	8,202	2,500	Asphalt

Statistics (2024)
- Passengers: 908,764 (▼14.8%)
- Cargo (tonnes): 9,503 (▲110.9%)
- Aircraft movements: 6,523 (▼15.3%)
- Source: DGCA

Haluoleo Airport (IATA: KDI, ICAO: WAWW), formerly Wolter Monginsidi Airport, is a domestic airport serving Kendari, the capital of Southeast Sulawesi, Indonesia. Although the airport primarily serves Kendari, it is located outside the city limits, in Ranomeeto, South Konawe Regency, approximately 15 km (9.3 mi) from Kendari’s city center. It is named after Halu Oleo (1488–1584), the sixth sultan of the Buton Sultanate. The airport was previously named in honor of Robert Wolter Monginsidi (1925–1949), an Indonesian national hero who was executed by the Dutch during the Indonesian National Revolution. Haluoleo Airport is the primary gateway to Kendari and the wider Southeast Sulawesi province. It offers regular flights to major Indonesian cities such as Jakarta, Surabaya, and Makassar, as well as regional connections to destinations within the province, including Bau-Bau and the Wangi-Wangi Islands.

In addition to serving as a commercial airport, the airport shares its facilities with Haluoleo Air Force Base, a Type B installation of the Indonesian Air Force, located across the runway from the passenger terminal. Given its strategic importance and location, the airbase is planned to be upgraded to a Type A installation in the future to strengthen Indonesia's air defence capabilities in the central region.

== History ==
=== Construction ===
Haluoleo Airport was originally constructed as a military airbase by the Dutch colonial authorities prior to the outbreak of World War II. The first aircraft to land on the airstrip was a Royal Netherlands East Indies Army Air Force (ML-KNIL) plane on 7 October 1938. Upon its completion, the airfield was considered as the best airfield throughout the Dutch East Indies, if not the entire Southeast Asia. The airfield had three runways and additional space for expansion. Before the outbreak of war, Dutch forces had already built barracks that can accommodate 500 troops and planned to expand it more for Australian or Royal Netherlands East Indies Army (KNIL) reinforcements. When the Pacific War began in 1941, the airbase was designated as Kendari Airfield II. In the lead-up to the Japanese invasion, Kendari Airfield II was defended by a small garrison from the KNIL. The defensive force comprised 20 KNIL infantry squadrons, totaling approximately 400 personnel, including both military and civilian staff. The garrison was supported by four armored cars under the command of Captain E.G.T. Anthonio. The airfield was also equipped with an anti-aircraft battery consisting of two 40 mm guns and an anti-aircraft machine gun platoon armed with three AAMGs. At the time, however, no fighter aircraft were stationed at Kendari Airfield II, leaving the base effectively undefended from aerial assault.

=== World War II ===
For the Japanese, the airfield was one of several key strategic locations that needed to be captured in order to establish a robust air support network for the successful invasion of Java. Along with airfields in southern Sumatra, Kuching, Banjarmasin, and Makassar, Kendari Airfield II was essential to Japan’s broader military objectives in the region. Its capture would allow the Japanese to launch air raids on eastern Java while maintaining air cover across a wide area stretching from Ambon to Kupang and Bali. Additionally, it provided an opportunity to establish a new naval base to support further operations in the Dutch East Indies.

On 15 January, Mitsubishi A6M Zero fighters from the Imperial Japanese Navy Air Service's 3rd Air Group strafed Kendari Airfield II. Although the attack inflicted only minimal physical damage and one aircraft was hit by Dutch anti-aircraft fire, it had a profound psychological impact, delivering a serious blow to Dutch morale. The day after the initial air raid, the entire Indonesian crew of the anti-aircraft detachment, along with several other troops, deserted their posts. The Japanese landed in Kendari on 24 January 1942. In an effort to deny the facility to the advancing enemy, the Dutch attempted to sabotage key installations at the airfield, including warehouses, the radio station, diesel engines, anti-aircraft guns, and transport vehicles. However, the demolition efforts were incomplete, and the Dutch forces ultimately abandoned the airfield. Within hours, Japanese troops seized control of the site, and the first Japanese aircraft landed later that same day.

After its capture, Kendari Airfield II was gradually upgraded by the Japanese, who began constructing various infrastructure to strengthen defenses in the area. In carrying out this development, the Japanese employed their usual mobilization tactic—using romusha, or forced laborers. Kendari Airfield II was projected as a key air defense base intended to secure the territories already under Japanese control. The conquest of other regions in Sulawesi was coordinated from Kendari, which served as a regional command center. For the Japanese, the airfield held strategic importance not only for controlling troop movements but also as a potential launch point for attacks on Australia and Java, particularly Surabaya. During the Japanese occupation, Kendari Airfield II underwent significant changes, especially in terms of air defense capabilities. On 8 January 1944, the Japanese deployed 40 anti-aircraft guns around the airfield. This number was later increased to 99 units, consisting of 10 heavy AA guns, 30 medium AA guns, and 59 light AA guns. These AA defenses were intended to protect the airbase from enemy air raids, ensuring that the strategically important facility was shielded from Allied aerial attacks. The Japanese also constructed various fortifications and supporting infrastructure, some remnants of which are still visible today.

=== Post war ===
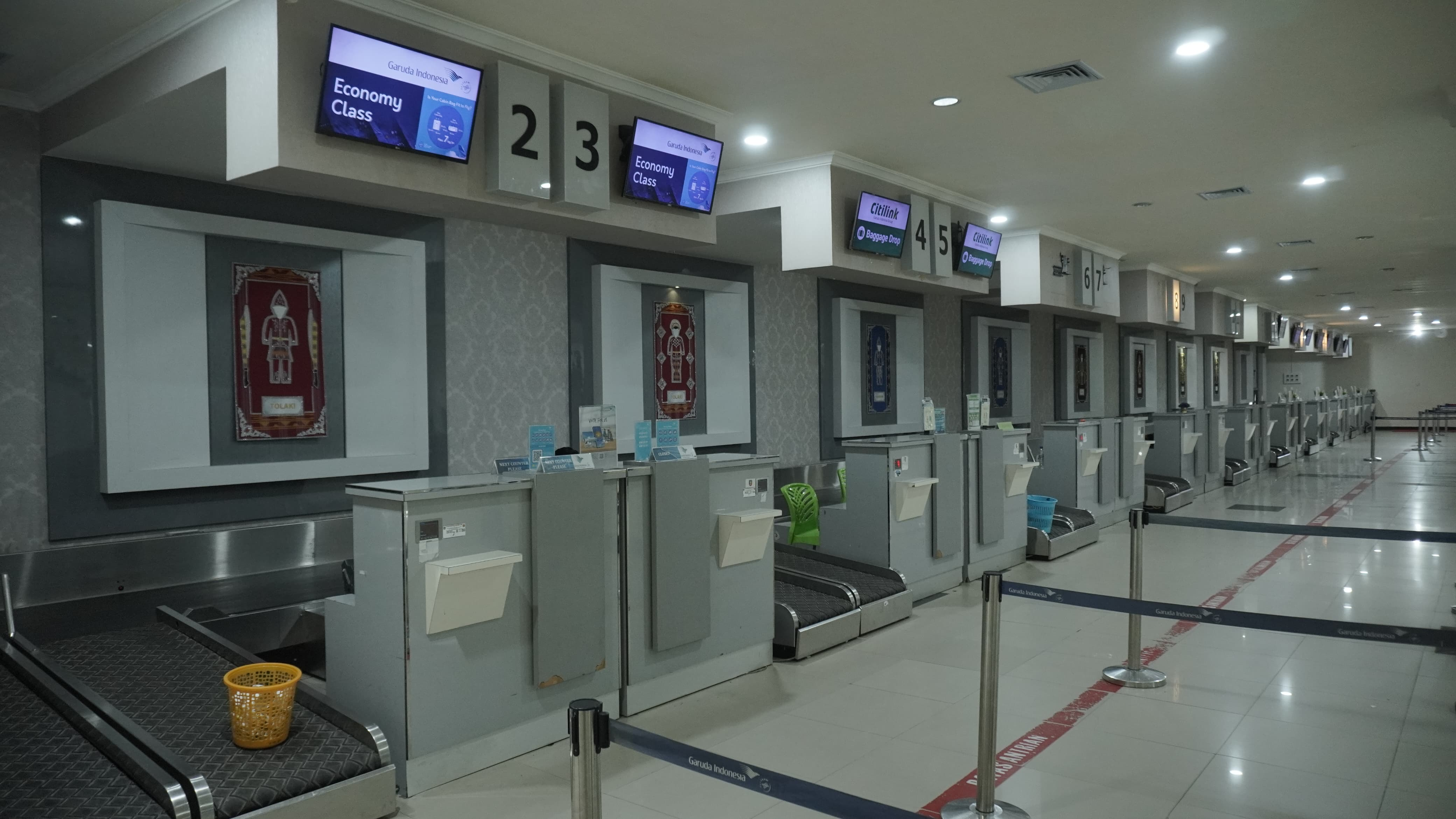
Check-in area

Following Japan’s surrender in 1945, control of the airfield was handed over to the Netherlands Indies Civil Administration (NICA), which maintained its hold on the facility throughout the Indonesian National Revolution. After the Dutch recognition of Indonesia’s sovereignty in 1949, the airfield was transferred to Indonesian authorities and came under the control of the Indonesian Air Force, which designated it as a military detachment.

In the 1950s, Kendari Airfield II was also used as a staging base for military operations against the Republic of South Maluku (RMS) rebellion in the Maluku Islands. The situation in Southeast Sulawesi further deteriorated following the Darul Islam rebellion in South Sulawesi, led by Kahar Muzakkar, which broke out on 7 August 1953. The unrest spread to neighboring areas, including Southeast Sulawesi, causing fear and anxiety among pro-government civilians. As a result, many sought safety by fleeing to military installations—one of which was Kendari Airfield II, then still operating as a detachment. Some 200 of the displaced individuals were later recruited as personnel by the Indonesian Air Force.

On 27 May 1958, Detachment Kendari II was renamed the Wolter Monginsidi Detachment (WMI) in honor of Robert Wolter Mongisidi, a national hero from North Sulawesi who fought during the revolution. As part of broader organizational development within the Indonesian Air Force, the detachment was later upgraded to a full airbase, officially becoming Wolter Monginsidi Air Force Base (Lanud Wolter Monginsidi) in 1963.

On 1 April 1976, Wolter Monginsidi Airport officially opened to civilian air traffic. Later, on 28 January 2010, the airport was renamed Haluoleo Airport, with the new name formally adopted on 13 February 2010. The renaming was initiated by the Southeast Sulawesi Provincial Government as a tribute to Halu Oleo, a former ruler of the Buton Sultanate and a unifying figure in the region’s history.

== Facility and development ==
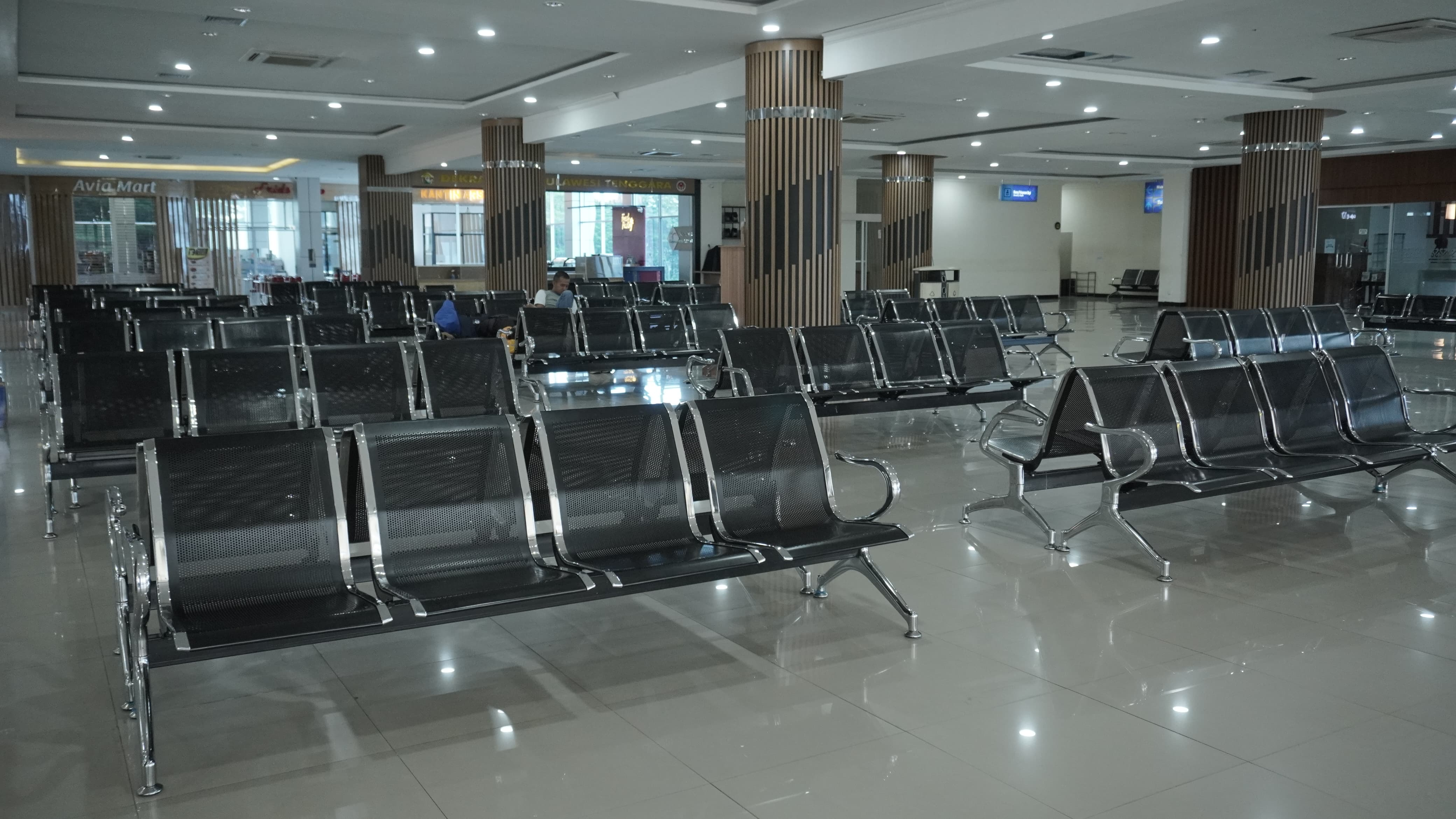
Boarding gate

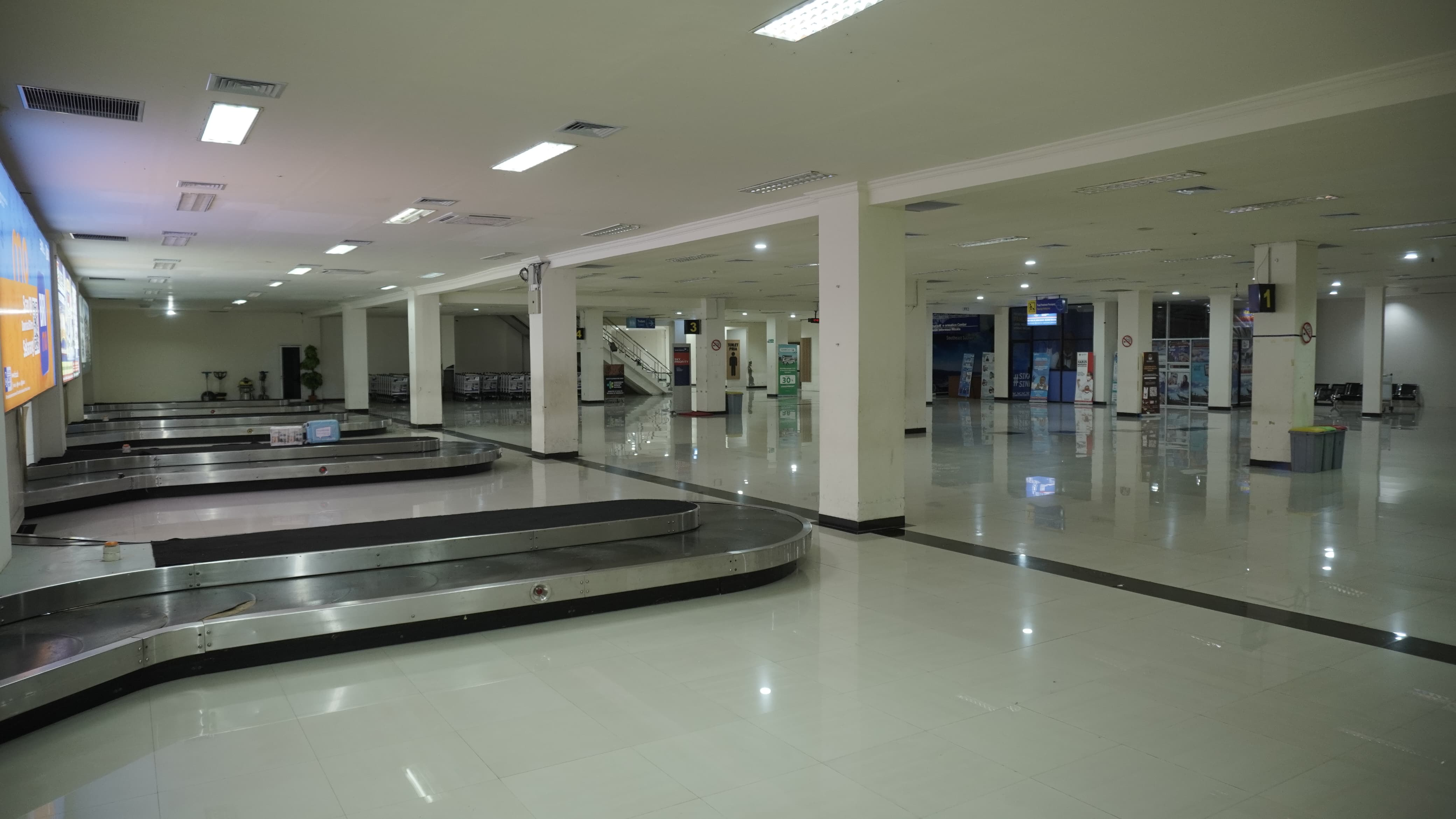
Baggage claim area

The airport terminal covers an area of 15,640 m² and has an annual capacity of approximately 1.1 million passengers. The two-story terminal is initially equipped with two jetbridges, with an additional two added in 2018. A minor renovation of the passenger terminal commenced in 2017 and was completed in 2019. The updated terminal layout has expanded the public waiting area and check-in counters, while also enhancing the arrival hall. The passenger waiting area is now nearly double its previous size. The revitalization program extends beyond the terminal, encompassing the renovation of the prayer room (mushola), toilet facilities, ATM center, customer service, canteen, and VVIP lounge. To further improve passenger comfort, new amenities such as an executive lounge and a children's play area in the waiting room have also been introduced.

Currently, Haluoleo Airport is being developed as a secondary transit hub for flights in eastern Indonesia, serving as an alternative to the heavily congested Sultan Hasanuddin International Airport in Makassar. In the future, it is expected that using Haluoleo Airport as a transit point will help reduce aircraft operating costs by saving fuel.

In 2011, the airport's apron was expanded from 195 × 91 meters to 234 × 113 meters, allowing it to accommodate up to five narrow-body aircraft simultaneously. It was expanded again in 2018, increasing its capacity to accommodate up to eight narrow-body aircraft simultaneously. The runway was also extended from 2,250 meters to 2,500 meters and widened from 30 meters to 45 meters to support operations of narrow-body aircraft such as the Boeing 737 and Airbus A320. The entire expansion project was completed by the end of 2012.

The runway is planned to be extended further, potentially reaching 3,100 m, to accommodate wide-body aircraft and support the airport’s planned designation as a Hajj embarkation point. This could facilitate the introduction of new international routes, including flights to Jeddah, Saudi Arabia, for Hajj pilgrims, while also improving connectivity to and supporting the development of the Konawe Industrial Estate (KIK), the Routa National Strategic Area (KSN) in Konawe, and the Buton Asphalt Special Economic Zone (KEK). Further upgrades include the installation of a Precision Approach Light System (PALS) along the runway. However, the project has been delayed due to insufficient land available to accommodate the required equipment.

== Airlines and destinations ==
=== Passenger ===
Airlines	Destinations
Batik Air	Jakarta–Soekarno-Hatta, Makassar
Citilink	Jakarta–Soekarno-Hatta
FlyJaya	Bone, Wakatobi
Garuda Indonesia	Jakarta–Soekarno-Hatta, (Note: Jakarta–Soekarno-Hatta is the continuation of Makassar flight, operating under the same flight number.) Makassar
Lion Air	Makassar, Surabaya
Pelita Air	Jakarta–Soekarno-Hatta
Super Air Jet	Jakarta–Soekarno-Hatta

== Traffic ==
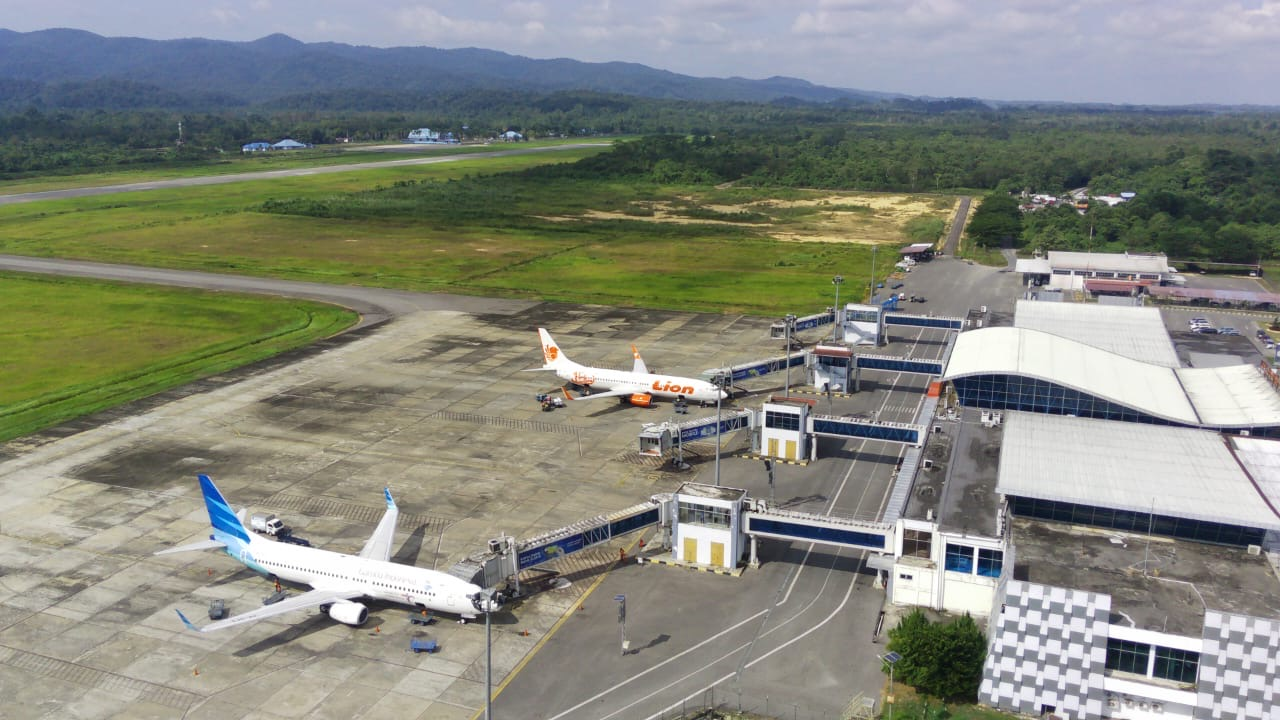
Apron view of Haluoleo Airport

Annual passenger numbers and aircraft statistics
Year	Passengers handled	Passenger % change	Cargo (tonnes)	Cargo % change	Aircraft movements	Aircraft % change
2006	186,960	Steady	939	Steady	2,882	Steady
2007	345,048	▲84.6	2,095	▲123.1	3,393	▲17.7
2008	418,346	▲21.2	2,572	▲22.8	3,399	▲0.2
2009	587,737	▲40.5	3,168	▲23.2	4,898	▲44.1
2010	602,355	▲2.5	3,601	▲13.7	5,279	▲7.8
2011	646,063	▲7.3	3,070	▼14.7	5,157	▼2.3
2012	856,544	▲32.6	3,006	▼2.1	6,741	▲30.7
2013	889,364	▲3.8	3,730	▲24.1	10,600	▲57.2
2014	825,294	▼7.2	3,784	▲1.4	10,024	▼5.4
2015	886,816	▲7.5	3,242	▼14.3	8,300	▼17.2
2016	1,241,328	▲40.0	595	▼81.6	9,970	▲20.1
2017	1,473,897	▲18.7	6,481	▲989.2	12,080	▲21.2
2018	1,544,643	▲4.8	6,213	▼4.1	12,430	▲2.9
2019	1,240,804	▼19.7	6,605	▲6.3	9,809	▼21.1
2020	653,845	▼47.3	7,336	▲11.1	6,572	▼33.0
2021	660,284	▲1.0	10,266	▲39.9	7,226	▲10.0
2022	912,833	▲38.2	11,877	▲15.7	7,394	▲2.3
2023	1,066,045	▲16.8	4,505	▼62.1	7,703	▲4.2
2024	908,764	▼14.8	9,503	▲110.9	6,523	▼15.3
Source: DGCA, BPS

== Ground transportation ==
Transport from Haluoleo Airport to Kendari City center is possible through the following options:

- Taxi

As with other airports in Indonesia, there is also a taxi service in the airport. For the distance from the airport to the city of Kendari itself is about ± 25 kilometers and takes about 30 to 40 minutes.

- Bus

Perum DAMRI operates services between the airport and the harbor. The service began from 30 September 2016.

== Accidents and incidents ==
- On 20 July 2019, Sriwijaya Air Flight 594, traveling from Makassar to Kendari, became stuck on freshly laid asphalt on the runway while taxiing to the apron. Initially, it was reported that the aircraft veered off the runway after landing while taxiing. Fortunately, none of the 102 passengers were injured in the incident.
