= Andi Jemma Airport =

Andi Jemma Airport Bandara Andi Jemma
- IATA: MXB; ICAO: WAFM

Summary
- Airport type: Public
- Operator: Government
- Serves: Masamba
- Location: North Luwu Regency, South Sulawesi, Sulawesi Island, Indonesia
- Time zone: WITA (UTC+08:00)
- Elevation AMSL: 55 m (180 ft)
- Coordinates: 02°33′35″S 120°19′50.01″E

Map
- Location of the airport in Sulawesi

Runways
Direction	Length		Surface
Direction	m	ft	Surface
02/20	900	2,953	Asphalt

Andi Jemma Airport (Indonesian: Bandara Andi Jemma) (IATA: MXB, ICAO: WAFM) is an airport near Masamba, the capital city of North Luwu Regency in the province of South Sulawesi on the island of Sulawesi in Indonesia.

== Facilities ==
The airport resides at an elevation of 55 metres (180 ft) above mean sea level. It has one runway designated 02/20 with an asphalt surface measuring 900 by 23 metres (2,953 ft × 75 ft).

Since August 2014, the service was left to a state-owned enterprise in charge of the management of several airports in eastern Indonesia, namely PT. Angkasa Pura 1 (Persero) and the Government of North Luwu Regency (begins division in August 2014).

== Airlines and destinations ==
Airlines	Destinations
FlyJaya	Makassar
Susi Air	Bua, Makassar, Rampi, Seko

== Accidents and incidents ==
- On 2 October 2015, an Aviastar DHC-6 Twin Otter, registered as PK-BRM, operating Aviastar Flight 7503 with three crew members and seven passengers on board, crashed near Palopo 11 minutes after takeoff. There were no survivors. The flight was taking off from Andi Jemma Airport for Makassar. The passengers were four adults, two children, and a baby.
