= Sangia Nibandera Airport =

Sangia Nibandera Airport Bandar Udara Sangia Nibandera
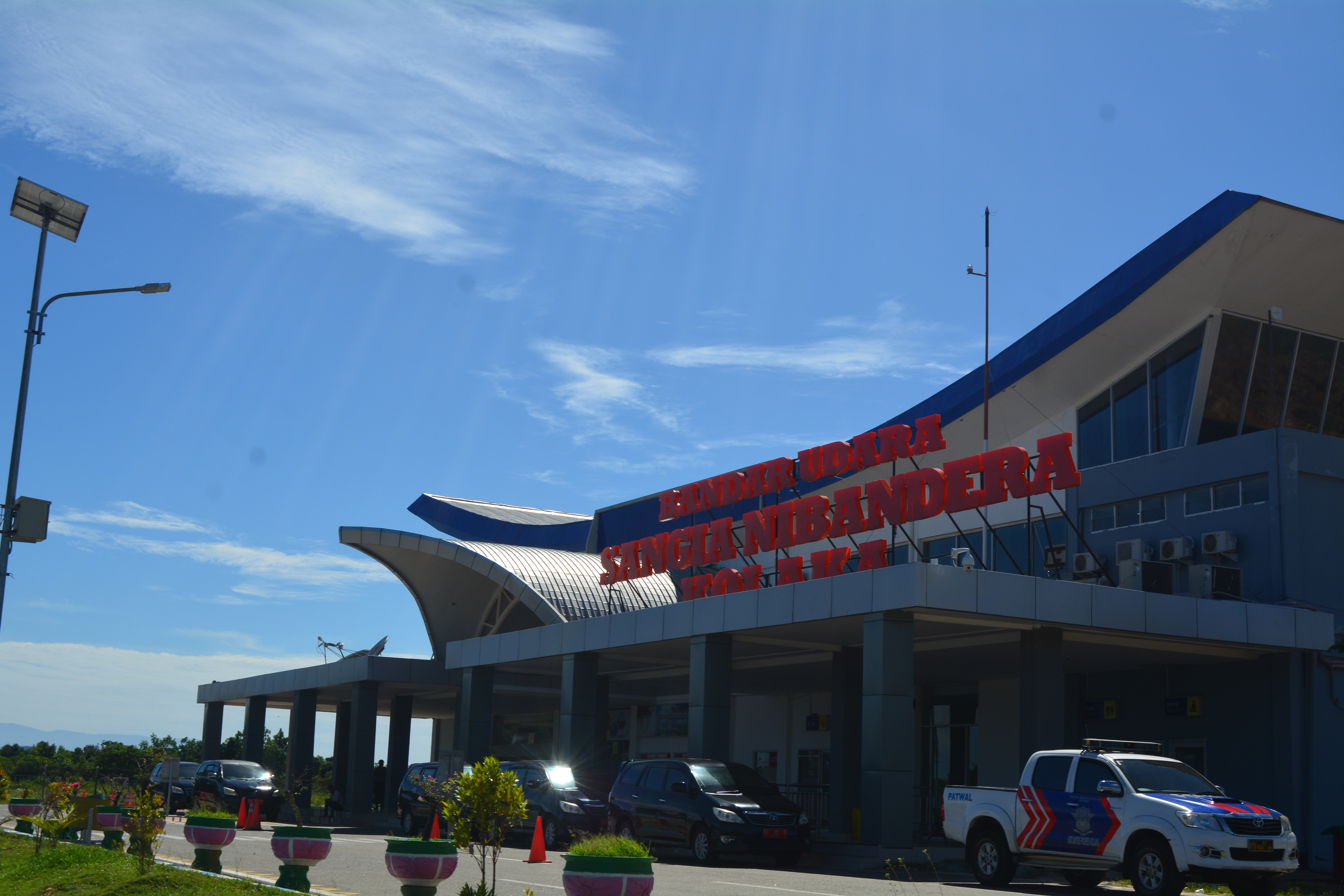
- IATA: KXB; ICAO: WAWP

Summary
- Airport type: Public
- Owner: Government of Indonesia
- Operator: Ministry of Transportation
- Serves: Tanggetada, Kolaka, Southeast Sulawesi, Indonesia
- Time zone: WITA (UTC+08:00)
- Elevation AMSL: 40 ft (12 m)
- Coordinates: 4°20′28″S 121°31′26″E
- Website: https://www.otban5.com/Kolaka
- Interactive map of Sangia Nibandera Airport

Runways
Direction	Length		Surface
Direction	m	ft	Surface
18/36	1,850	6,070	Asphalt
- https://www.iata.org/en/publications/directories/code-search/?airport.search=KXB, https://skyvector.com/airport/WAWP/Sangia-Nibandera-Airport

Sangia Nibandera Airport (Indonesian: Bandar Udara Sangia Nibandera) is an airport located at Kolaka, Southeast Sulawesi in Indonesia. The airport was opened on June 25, 2010. The airport is named after Raja Sangia Nibandera, who was the first king of the Mekongga tribe (indigenous people of Kolka) and spread Islam in Kolaka region.

== Airlines and destinations ==
Airlines	Destinations
Sriwijaya Air	Makassar
Wings Air	Makassar

== Accidents ==
A fire caused by a lightning strike destroyed the main terminal building of the airport on 26 November 2013.
