= Bua Airport =

Airport in Indonesia

Bua Airport Bandar Udara Bua
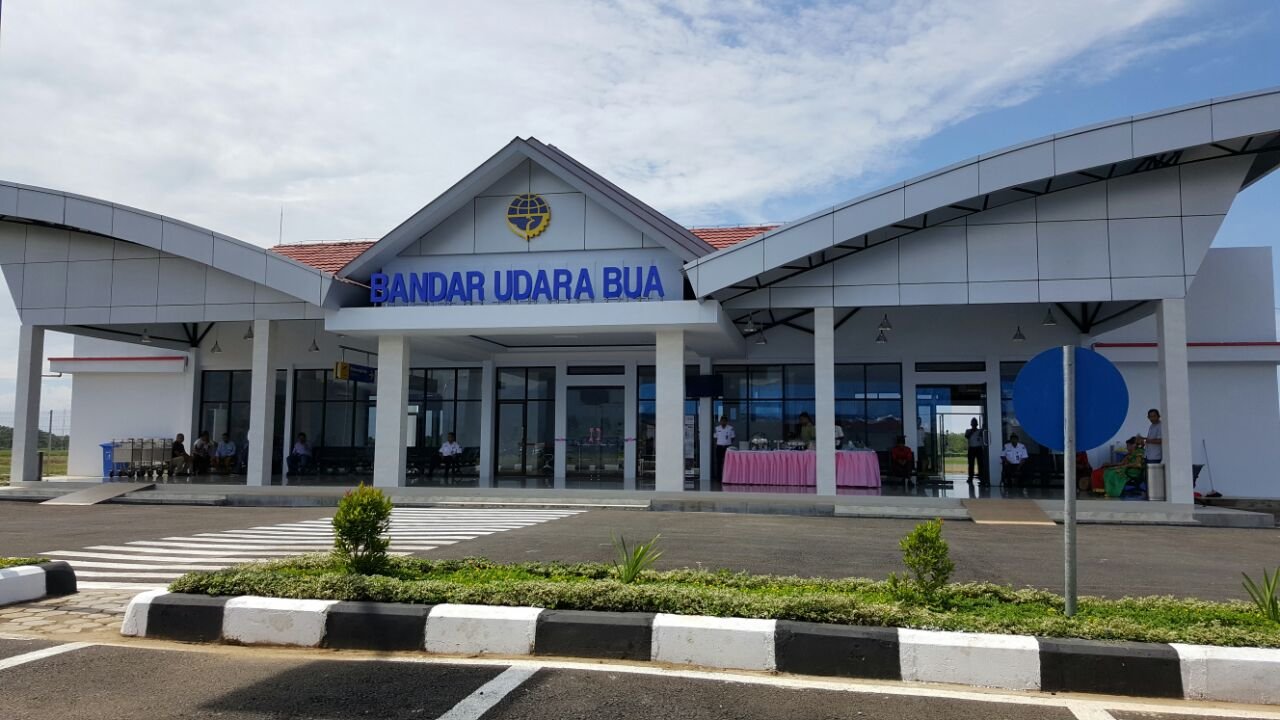
- IATA: LLO; ICAO: WAFD

Summary
- Airport type: Public
- Owner: Government of Indonesia
- Operator: Ministry of Transportation
- Serves: Palopo
- Location: Luwu Regency, South Sulawesi, Sulawesi Island, Indonesia
- Elevation AMSL: 4 m / 13 ft
- Coordinates: 03°05′05″S 120°14′43″E

Maps
- Sulawesi region in Indonesia

- Location of airport in Sulawesi

Runways
Direction	Length		Surface
Direction	m	ft	Surface
17/35	1,400	4,593	Asphalt
- Sources: DGCA

Bua Airport, also known as Palopo Lagaligo Airport (IATA: LLO, ICAO: WAFD), is an airport in Luwu Regency, South Sulawesi, Sulawesi Island, Indonesia. It serves the city of Palopo, which is located 10 km from the airport. The airport has a land area of about 100 hectares. To accommodate larger aircraft, the airport's facility was upgraded in 2015. With a budget allocation of Rp 25 billion, the government has fixed a number of supporting facilities including runways which have now been extended to 1,400 m x 30 m. In addition, the airport is now equipped with a taxiway with a length of 191 meters and a width of 18 meters, and an apron which has a length of 80 meters and a width of 60 meters. Runway lights have been added to allow aircraft to land at night. A fence surrounding the airport has been added to prevent animals from entering the grounds.

Bua Airport is equipped with a representative passenger terminal, which has a furnished departure lounge, arrival lounge, baggage claim area, VIP room, and a five-star hotel standard toilet. The airport has a power house equipped with three engine generators ready to operate automatically during blackouts. The airport has been strengthened with 131 kVA electric power. The airport also has an accident rescue and firefighting building.

== Facilities ==
The airport resides at an elevation of 4 metres (13 ft) above mean sea level. It has one runway designated 17/35 with an asphalt surface measuring 1,400 m x 30 m (4593 ft × 98 ft).

== Airlines and destinations ==
The following destinations are served from Palopo Lagaligo Airport:

Airlines	Destinations
Wings Air	Makassar
