= Garuda Indonesia =

National airline of Indonesia

PT Garuda Indonesia (Persero) Tbk

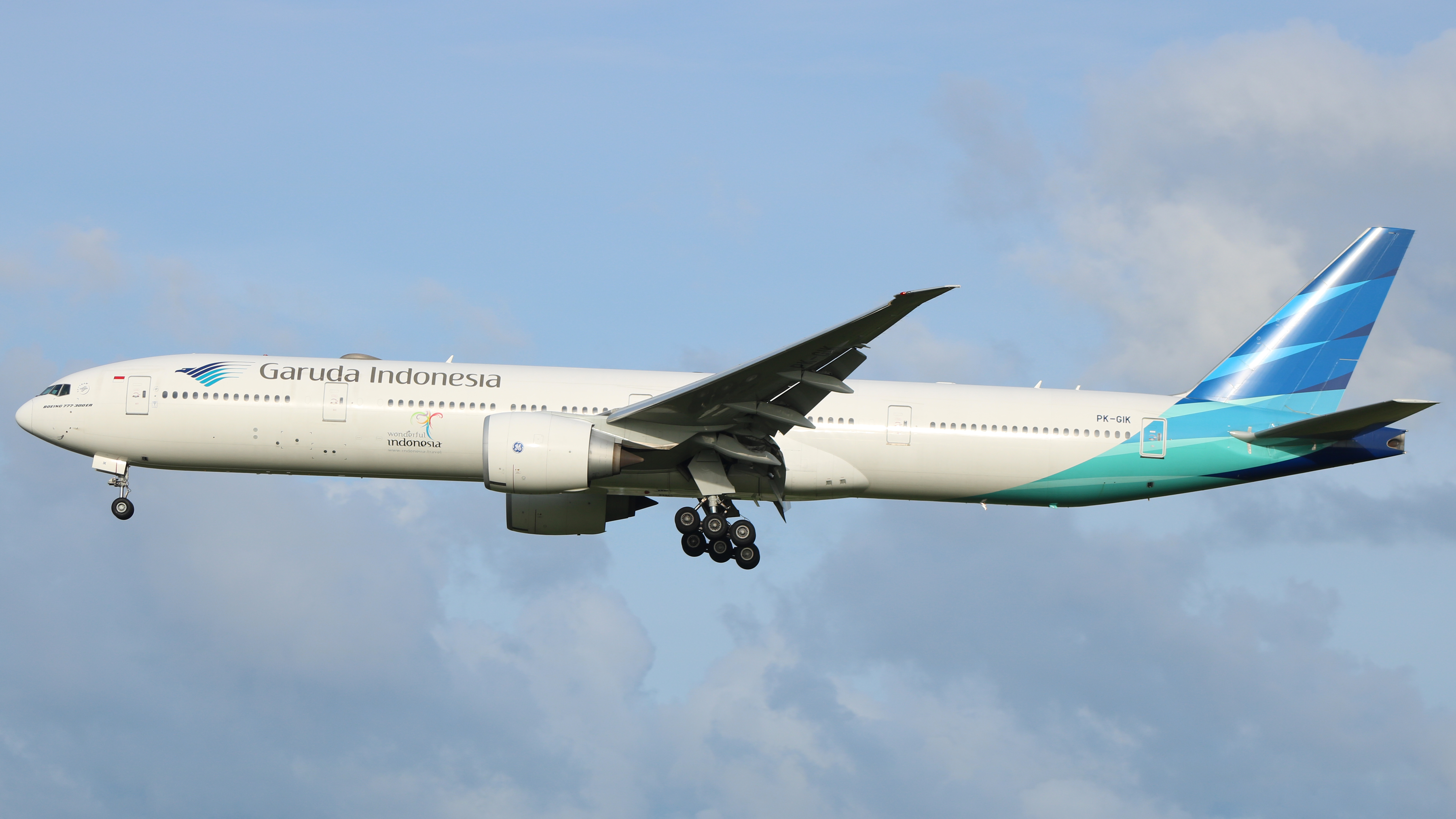
- A Garuda Indonesia Boeing 777-300ER
IATA	ICAO	Call sign
GA	GIA	INDONESIA
- Founded: 26 January 1949; 77 years ago
- Commenced operations: 26 January 1949; 77 years ago (as Indonesian Airways); 28 December 1949; 76 years ago (as Garuda Indonesian Airways)
- Hubs: Jakarta–Soekarno-Hatta
- Secondary hubs: Denpasar; Makassar
- Focus cities: Surabaya
- Frequent-flyer program: GarudaMiles
- Alliance: SkyTeam
- Subsidiaries: Aerowisata; Citilink; GMF AeroAsia; Aero Systems Indonesia; Sabre Travel Network Indonesia
- Fleet size: 78 (31 December 2025)
- Destinations: 53 (2025)
- Parent company: PT Danantara Asset Management (92.03%, 2025)
- Traded as: IDX: GIAA
- Headquarters: Garuda City Center Building Complex; M1 Street, Soekarno–Hatta International Airport, Tangerang, Banten, Indonesia
- Key people: Glenny Kairupan (President & CEO); Fadjar Prasetyo (President Commissioner)
- Revenue: ▼US$3.217 billion (2025)
- Net income: ▼US$−319.39 million (2025)
- Total assets: ▲US$7.432 billion (2025)
- Total equity: ▲US$91.91 million (2025)
- Employees: 5,154 (2025)
- Website: www.garuda-indonesia.com; www.cargo.garuda-indonesia.com

Garuda Indonesia is the flag carrier of Indonesia, headquartered at Soekarno–Hatta International Airport near Jakarta. A successor of KLM Interinsulair Bedrijf, it is a member of SkyTeam airline alliance, operating scheduled flights to a number of destinations across Asia, Europe, and Australia from its hubs, focus cities, as well as other cities for Hajj.

At its peak from the late 1980s to the mid 1990s, Garuda operated an extensive network of flights all over the world, with regularly scheduled services to Adelaide, Cairo, Fukuoka, Los Angeles, Paris, Rome, and other cities in Europe, Australia and Asia. In the late 1990s and early 2000s, a series of financial and operational difficulties hit the airline hard, causing it to drastically cut back services. In 2009, the airline undertook a five-year modernization plan known as the Quantum Leap, which overhauled the airline's brand, livery, logo and uniforms, as well as acquiring a newer, more modern fleet and facilities and renewing focus on international markets.

In June 2022, an Indonesian court approved Garuda Indonesia’s restructuring of more than US$9 billion of debt. The group reported a net loss of US$319.39 million in 2025. In 2026, Skytrax reduced the airline’s service and product rating from five stars to four.

Garuda also operates the low-cost subsidiary Citilink, which began operating under its own air operator’s certificate in 2012. In November 2018, the airline took over operations as well as financial management of Sriwijaya Air by a cooperation agreement (KSO); the cooperation ended in November 2019.

== History ==
=== Beginnings (1949–60s) ===
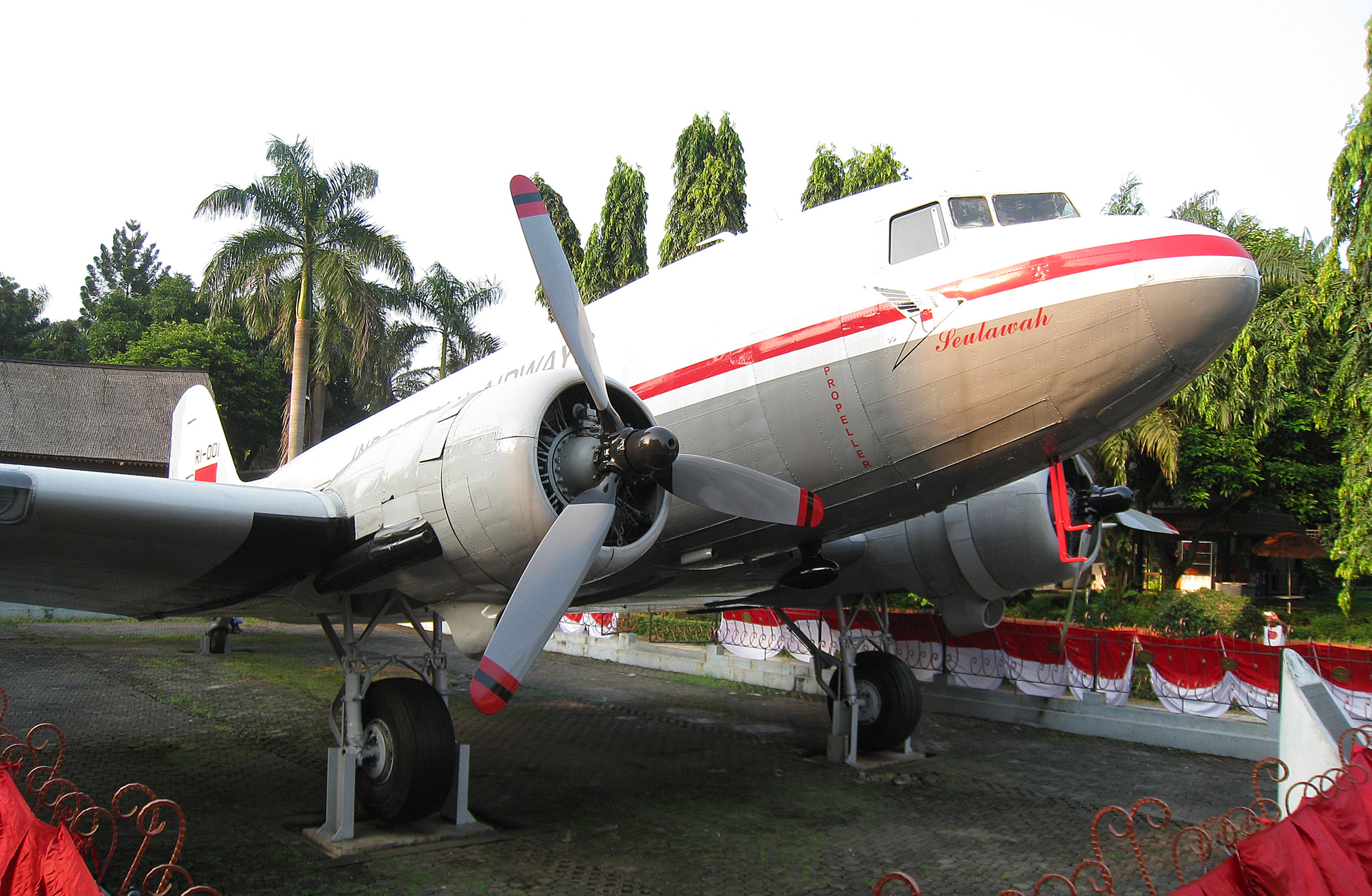
A Douglas DC-3 displayed as Seulawah at Taman Mini Indonesia Indah, Jakarta

Garuda Indonesia succeeded KLM Interinsulair Bedrijf, the KLM subsidiary that had operated in the Indonesian archipelago after the Second World War. Garuda was incorporated on 31 March 1950 as a joint venture between KLM and the Indonesian government. The government acquired KLM’s shares in 1954, while the replacement and training of Dutch personnel continued over subsequent years.

In its current institutional form, Garuda Indonesia had its beginnings in the Indonesian war of independence against the Dutch in the late 1940s, when Garuda flew special transports with a Douglas DC-3. The first aircraft was a DC-3 known as Seulawah (Acehnese: "Gold Mountain") and was purchased for 120,000 Malayan dollars, which was provided by the people of Aceh (notably local merchants). The first commercial flight from Calcutta to Yangon (then, Rangoon) was on 26 January 1949, using a DC-3 Dakota aircraft with the tail number RI 001 and the name Indonesian Airways. 26 January 1949 is generally recognized as the airline's founding date.

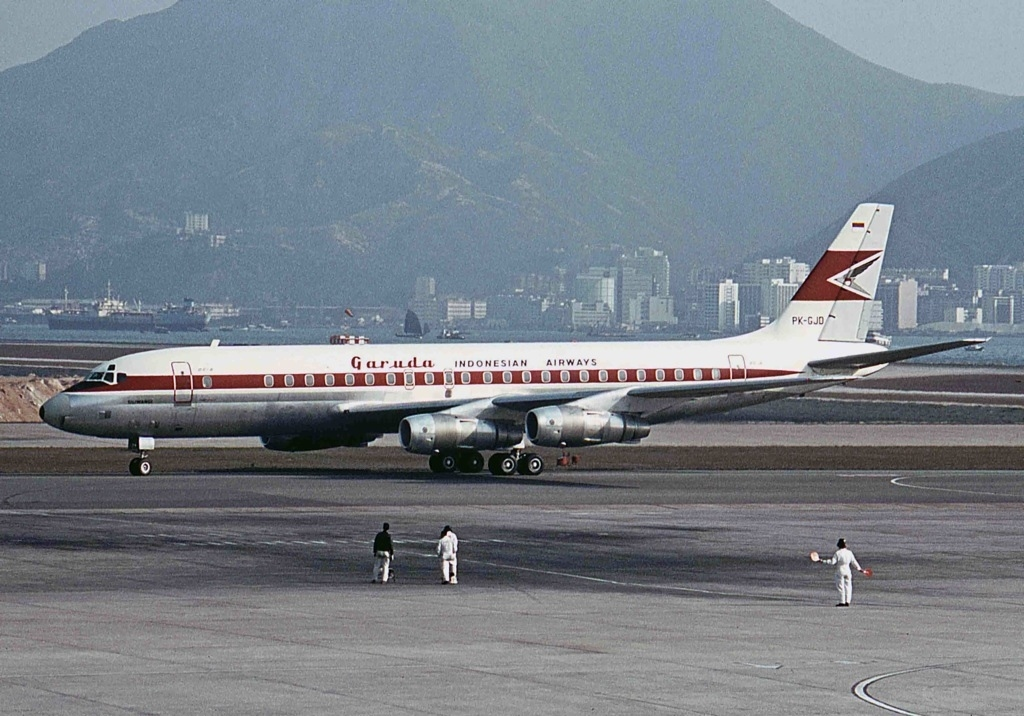
A Garuda Indonesian Airways Douglas DC-8-55 at Kai Tak Airport in 1967

The name Garuda, adopted at Sukarno’s suggestion, refers to the bird that serves as Vishnu’s mount in Hindu mythology. On 28 December 1949, a flight under the name Garuda Indonesian Airways travelled from Jakarta to Yogyakarta to collect Sukarno.

Initially, Garuda relied on KLM personnel, including pilots, technicians and managers, who also trained Indonesian staff. The transfer to Indonesian management formed part of the government’s wider policy of economic decolonisation.

In 1954, the airline had 41 aircraft: 15 Dakotas, eight Convair 240s, 13 de Havilland Herons, one Catalina and four Convair 340s. In 1956, the airline operated its first flight to Mecca with Convair aircraft, carrying 40 Indonesian pilgrims.

Garuda Indonesia Convair 990 Pajajaran at Schiphol Airport on 2 July 1964, during the airline's first arrival at the airport and the subsequent departure of 85 Ambonese passengers for Indonesia

Garuda's fleet continued to grow throughout the 1960s, during which the airline continued its expansion. It acquired three Lockheed L-188 Electras in 1961, which supplemented its Convair CV-240 fleet, before taking delivery of its first jet aircraft, the Convair 990 Coronado, in 1963, which allowed it to launch flights to Hong Kong.

In the early 1960s, Qantas overhauled engines from Garuda's Lockheed L-188 Electra aircraft and transported them back to Jakarta.

In 1965, the airline took delivery of its first Douglas DC-8, and grew beyond the Asian market it was focused on, beginning scheduled flights from Kemayoran Airport to Amsterdam and Frankfurt via Colombo, Bombay, and Prague. Rome and Paris became the airline's third and fourth European destinations, with flights stopping in Bombay and Cairo to refuel. Flights to the People's Republic of China began that same year, with service to Guangzhou via Phnom Penh, the first Indonesian airline to do so.

=== Continued growth (1970s–90s) ===
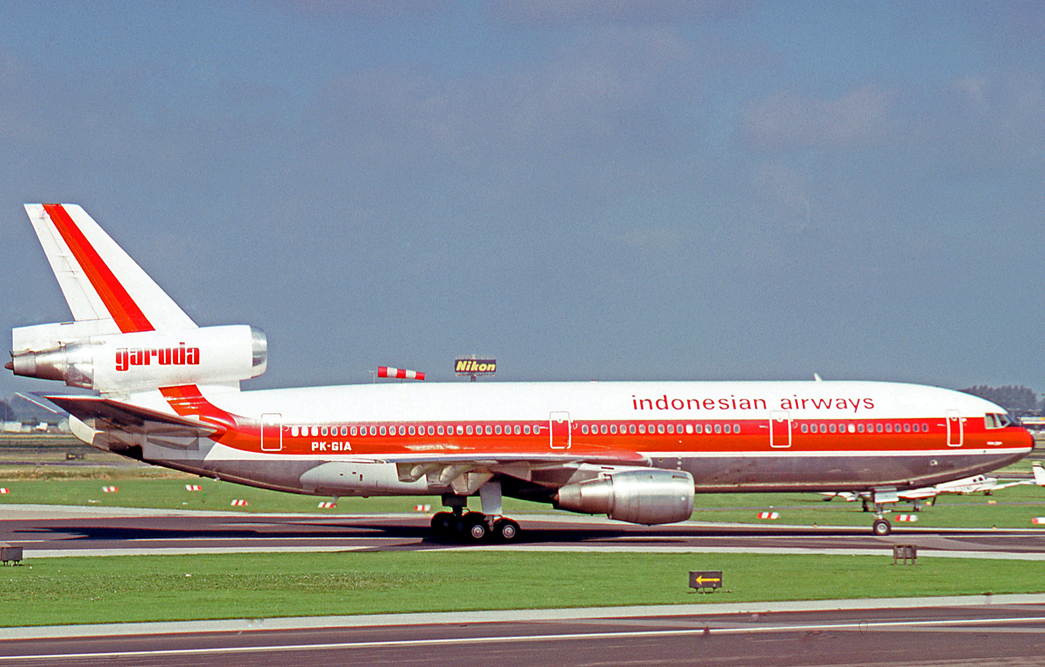
A Douglas DC-10-30 of Garuda Indonesian Airways at Amsterdam Schiphol Airport in 1977

During the early 1970s, Garuda Indonesian Airways took delivery of both the McDonnell Douglas DC-9 (first delivered in 1969) and Fokker F28 Fellowship (first delivered in 1971) for its short and medium-haul operations. The airline went on to take delivery of 62 F28s, holding the title of the largest operator of the F28 in the world. In 1976, Garuda took delivery of its first McDonnell Douglas DC-10, giving it the capability to carry more passengers and fly longer flights, and replacing the DC-8 and Convair 990 fleet on flights within Asia and to Europe. The DC-10 became an integral part of the Garuda fleet for the years to come, outlasting the newer McDonnell Douglas MD-11s, before the type was finally retired in 2004. In 1980, the airline took delivery of the first Boeing 747-200, complementing the DC-10 on high-capacity or long-range routes.

On 21 June 1982, Garuda became the launch customer of the Airbus A300 B4-220FFCC, the first variant of the A300 capable of being operated with two pilots instead of three. By 1984, nine of these were in service, supplemented by 8 McDonnell Douglas DC-10s, 24 DC-9s, 45 Fokker F-28s, and 6 Boeing 747-200s. In 1985, under Reyn Altin Johannes Lumenta, who had been CEO since 1984, Garuda Indonesian Airways hired Landor Associates to create a new logo, livery and brand.

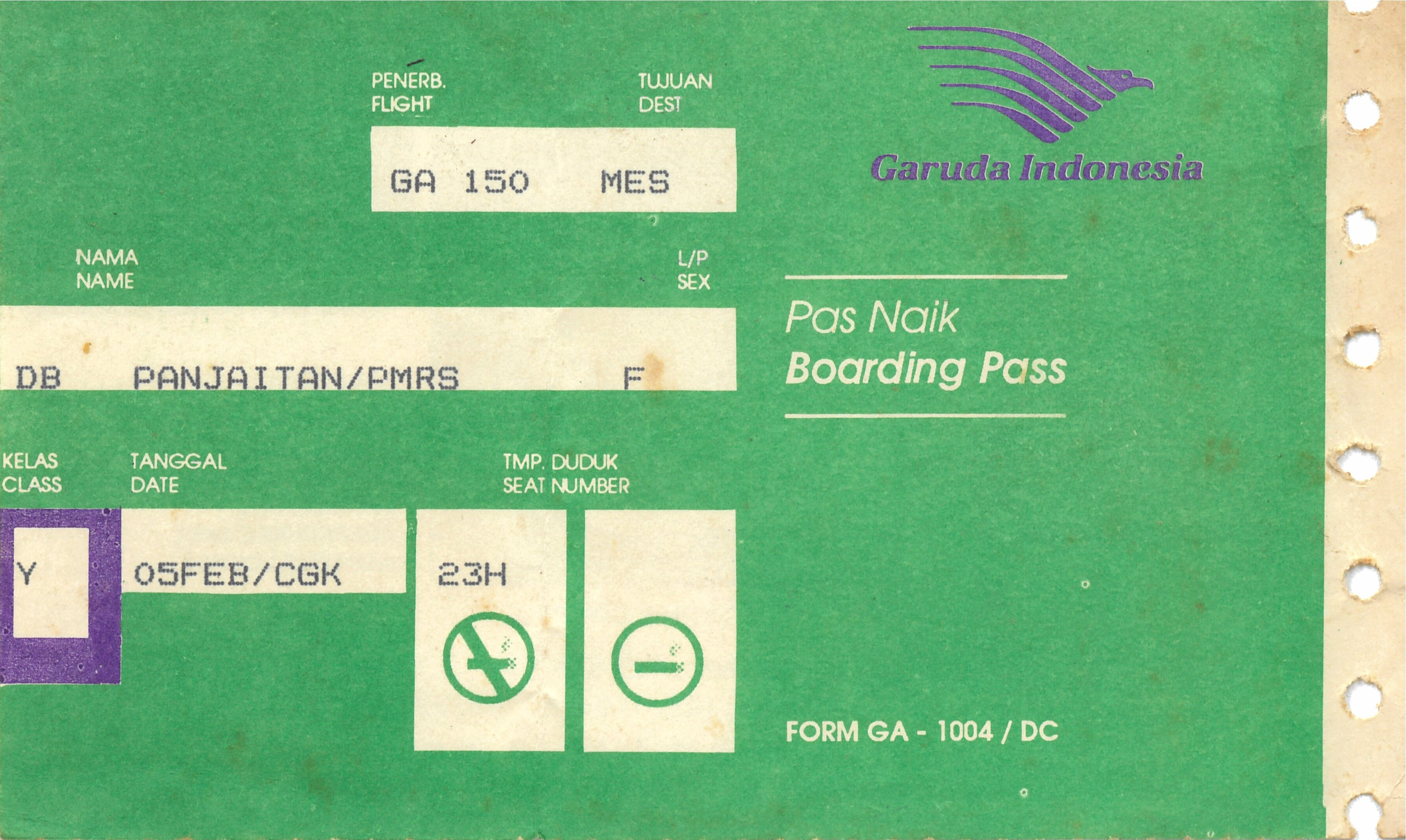
A boarding ticket issued by Garuda Indonesia

Under Lumenta, Garuda Indonesia also increased the number of flight frequencies and destinations, reduced ticket prices and collaborated with Merpati Nusantara Airlines, introducing flexible tickets valid for both Indonesian airlines.

In 1991, Garuda took delivery of the McDonnell Douglas MD-11s, which gradually replaced the DC-10 on flights to Europe and allowed the airline to launch flights to Los Angeles via Honolulu. During this time, the airline operated a fleet of the aforementioned MD-11s, DC-10s, Boeing 747, Airbus A300 and Boeing 737-400, operating it to destinations throughout Asia, Europe and North America. In 1994, Garuda took delivery of its first Boeing 747-400 aircraft, which remained in its fleet until 2017, operating Hajj flights and high-density short-haul routes, while the delivery of the first Airbus A330-300 in 1996 allowed more flexibility, as it was more fuel-efficient than the three- and four-engine jets. That same year, Garuda placed an order for six Boeing 777 aircraft, due for delivery in 2000, but a new series of challenges and difficulties were about to hit the airline.

=== Difficult period (1996–2004) ===
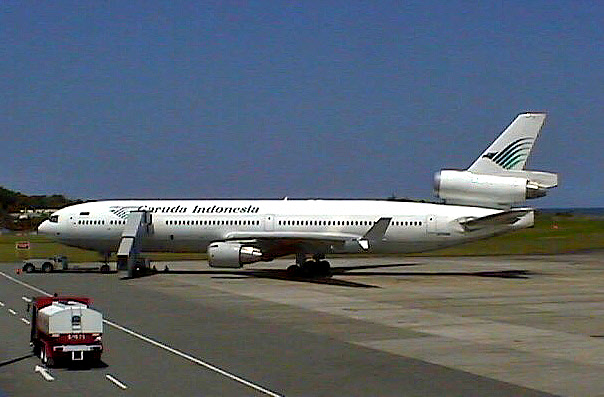
A McDonnell Douglas MD-11 of Garuda at Sepinggan International Airport in 2001

The late 1990s and early 2000s proved a turbulent and difficult time for Garuda; accidents in Fukuoka (Flight 865) in 1996 and Medan (Flight 152) in 1997 added to problems caused by the 1997 Asian financial crisis, resulting in a drastic reduction in operations, including termination of service to the Americas and a massive scaling back of its European operations. Largely due to historical links with the Netherlands, Garuda continued to operate flights to Amsterdam after the initial cutbacks. The other European routes that continued were Frankfurt and London. However, Garuda attempted to launch its first non-stop flight from Jakarta to Europe with a Jakarta to Frankfurt service, continuing on to London and back on October 28, 2001, as Garuda Indonesia Flights 970 and 971, the route was short-lived and the route was axed in early 2002 due to the effect of tourism caused by the attacks in the US on September 11 the previous year, along with the ditching of Garuda Flight 421 earlier that year. Finally, both routes returned back to one-stop services until they were discontinued in 2003, with the Amsterdam route discontinued the following year on 28 October 2004. The situation was exacerbated by the 11 September 2001 terrorist attacks in the U.S., the Bali bombings, the 2004 Indian Ocean earthquake and tsunami, and the SARS scare, all of which contributed to a downturn in air travel and Indonesian tourism. Shortly after, its earlier order for the Boeing 777 was deferred, and so was an order for 18 Boeing 737-800s to replace its ageing 737 Classic fleet. By 2005, Garuda had largely recovered from its economic problems, swapping its order for six Boeing 777-200ERs for ten of the smaller Boeing 787-8 Dreamliners in 2005, but its operational problems remained.

=== Murder of Munir Said Thalib ===
On 7 September 2004, human rights activist Munir Said Thalib died from arsenic poisoning while travelling on a Garuda flight to Amsterdam via Singapore. Off-duty Garuda pilot Pollycarpus Priyanto was convicted of his murder. In February 2008, former Garuda president director Indra Setiawan was sentenced to one year in prison for assisting the murder. In January 2009, the Supreme Court overturned the acquittal of Garuda employee Rohainil Aini and sentenced her to one year in prison for preparing a false assignment letter for Pollycarpus.

Garuda was also ordered to compensate Munir’s widow after a civil finding that it had been negligent in failing to make an emergency landing. In June 2011, The Jakarta Post reported that the compensation remained unpaid.

=== European ban (2007–2009) ===
In June 2007, the European Union announced a ban on Garuda Indonesia and all other Indonesian airlines, amid concerns about aviation safety oversight in Indonesia. The ban was implemented through a European Commission regulation in July.

In November 2007, Garuda announced its intention to fly to Amsterdam from Jakarta and Denpasar with either Airbus A330 or Boeing 777 aircraft if the EU lifted its ban. On 28 November 2007, the EU said that the safety reforms already undertaken were a step in the right direction for the EU to consider lifting the ban, but still did not satisfy the EU's aviation safety standards, and thus did not lift its ban. The ban was lifted in July 2009, after which Garuda began evaluating service to Amsterdam and other European destinations, as well as the United States.

=== Developments after the lifting of ban (2009–2020) ===
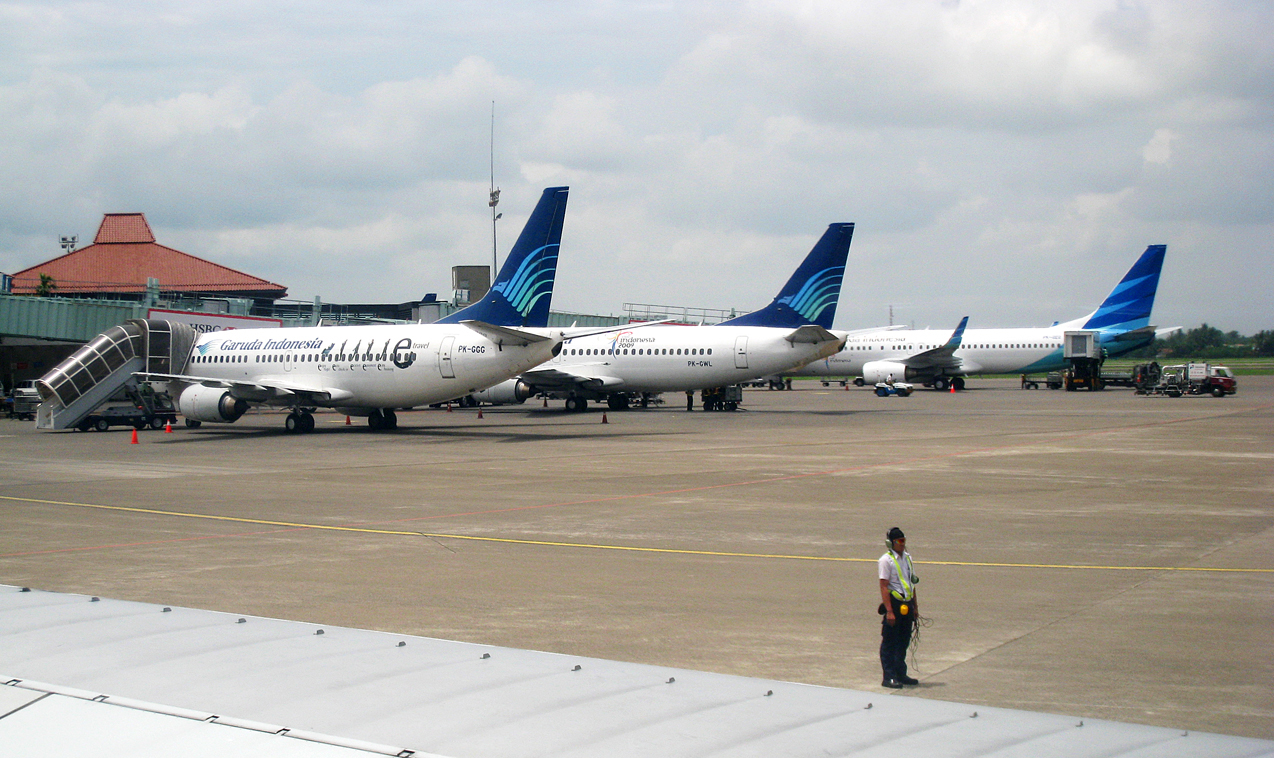
Comparison between Garuda's current and previous livery. The aircraft on the right is in the current livery; the other two are in the airline's previous livery (2010).

Following the lifting of the EU ban against Garuda Indonesia, Airfast Indonesia, Mandala Airlines and Premiair, the airline announced in July 2009 a five-year expansion plan known as the Quantum Leap. The plan involved an image overhaul, including changing the airline's livery, staff uniform and logo, and nearly doubling the size of its fleet from 62 to 116. The Quantum Leap also aimed to boost annual passenger numbers to 27.6 million in the same period, up from 10.1 million at the time of program launch through increasing domestic and international destinations from 41 to 62. Route expansions included Amsterdam, with a stopover in Dubai, in 2010. In 2014, Garuda flew to Amsterdam non-stop five times a week using a Boeing 777-300ER with continuing service to London, with a sixth weekly service planned for the end of 2015. Other European and American cities such as Frankfurt, Paris, Rome, Madrid and Los Angeles were considered for reopening.

As part of the Quantum Leap, the airline refreshed its logo and redesigned its livery in 2009, more than 20 years after the last update. New uniforms were introduced in 2010. In 2010, the airline placed a firm order for six additional Airbus A330s at the 2010 Farnborough Airshow, while it opened a new hub at Sultan Hasanuddin International Airport, Makassar, South Sulawesi to increase services to the eastern part of Indonesia on 1 June 2011, its third after Jakarta and Denpasar. Garuda won the Skytrax World’s Best Cabin Crew award for five consecutive years from 2014 to 2018. During this period, the airline also added additional frequencies to many of its international routes, including to Singapore, Bangkok, Beijing and Shanghai from Jakarta, while it also added capacity to Denpasar-Seoul.

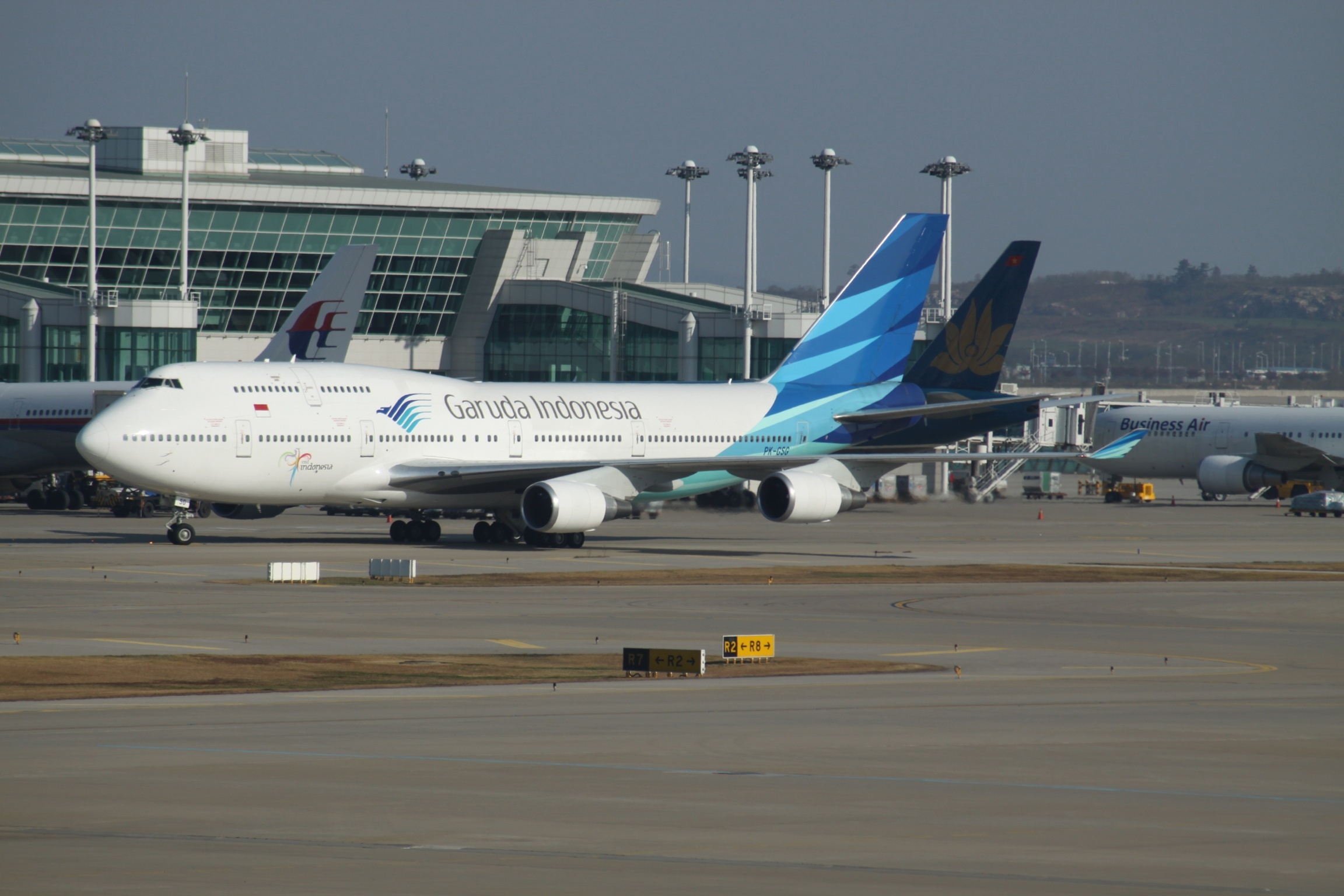
Garuda Indonesia Boeing 747-400 in the airline's then-new livery at Seoul Incheon Airport in 2012. The livery was introduced in 2009 as part of the Quantum Leap programme.

At the Paris Air Show 2011, Garuda Indonesia announced a firm order of 25 Airbus A320s with an option for another 25. All 25 Airbus A320s were intended for its subsidiary, Citilink The airline's earlier order for the Boeing 787, made in 2005, was changed once more, due to the delays in the 787's entry into service. Garuda opted to sign for 10 Boeing 777-300ERs instead, which it would take delivery of in 2013 to use on long-haul flights to Europe, and medium-haul flights within Asia, such as to Japan, China, Singapore and Saudi Arabia, as well as short-haul domestic routes between Jakarta and Denpasar.

The airline made its debut on the Indonesia Stock Exchange in February 2011, with the government of Indonesia retaining a majority of the shares. PT Trans Airways bought 10.9% stake of Garuda Indonesia unsold IPO shares from underwriters on 27 April 2012. The transaction was valued at Rp 1.53 trillion ($166.8 million). In late 2014, the airline became one of seven airlines to earn a 5-star rating from Skytrax, marking the end of the five-year Quantum Leap program. Following this announcement, Emirsyah Satar, who had been CEO for the past nine years, announced his resignation and retirement and promoted former Citilink chief Arif Wibowo as his successor.

Following Wibowo's promotion, he began a "Quick Wins" cost-cutting drive to cut down on losses while boosting revenue through various measures, including cancelling unprofitable routes and increasing staff efficiency. Despite this, Wibowo remained committed to continuing the airline's international expansion, particularly once market conditions, such as the weakening rupiah, improved. This was reaffirmed following the airline's announcement of its intent to order 90 new aircraft, from both Boeing and Airbus, worth $20 billion at list prices at the 2015 Paris Air Show. Wibowo retired from his position in 2017, replaced by Pahala Nugraha Mansury the same year before being replaced by I Gusti Ngurah Askhara Danadiputra, otherwise known as Ari Askhara in 2018. Ari Askhara took over as Garuda's CEO in September 2018, setting a new strategy of capacity cuts and price increases. The airline reported a $19.7 million profit in Q1 2019, up from a $64.3 million loss the prior year, including a 12% rise in revenue.

During Ari Askhara's leadership, Garuda introduced live acoustic concerts on domestic flights, which led to criticism, as well as reopening the London route from Denpasar, with transit in Medan's Kualanamu International Airport.

In April 2019, commissioners Chairal Tanjung and Dony Oskaria declined to sign Garuda’s 2018 financial statements, disputing the recognition of revenue from an in-flight connectivity agreement with PT Mahata Aero Teknologi. In June, regulators ordered the airline to restate its accounts and imposed sanctions on the company and its auditors. The restated results, published in July, showed a consolidated net loss of US$175.02 million for 2018, compared with the US$5.01 million profit originally reported.

In July 2019, the Garuda employees' union, SEKARGA, filed a police complaint against travel reviewer Rius Vernandes after he posted a photograph of a handwritten menu from a Sydney–Jakarta flight. The union withdrew the complaint following mediation on 19 July.

==== Dismissal of Ari Askhara ====
On 5 December 2019, State-Owned Enterprises Minister Erick Thohir announced the dismissal of Garuda president director Ari Askhara after customs officials found undeclared Harley-Davidson motorcycle parts and Brompton bicycles on the delivery flight of a new Airbus A330-900. In June 2021, the Tangerang District Court sentenced Askhara to a one-year prison term suspended for a 20-month probationary period and fined him Rp300 million in the customs case.

In December 2019, cabin-crew representatives complained of arbitrary transfers and long-haul duties without overnight rest. Garuda subsequently restored overnight stays on the affected flights and said it would review other policies.

=== COVID-19 pandemic and restructuring (2020–2022) ===
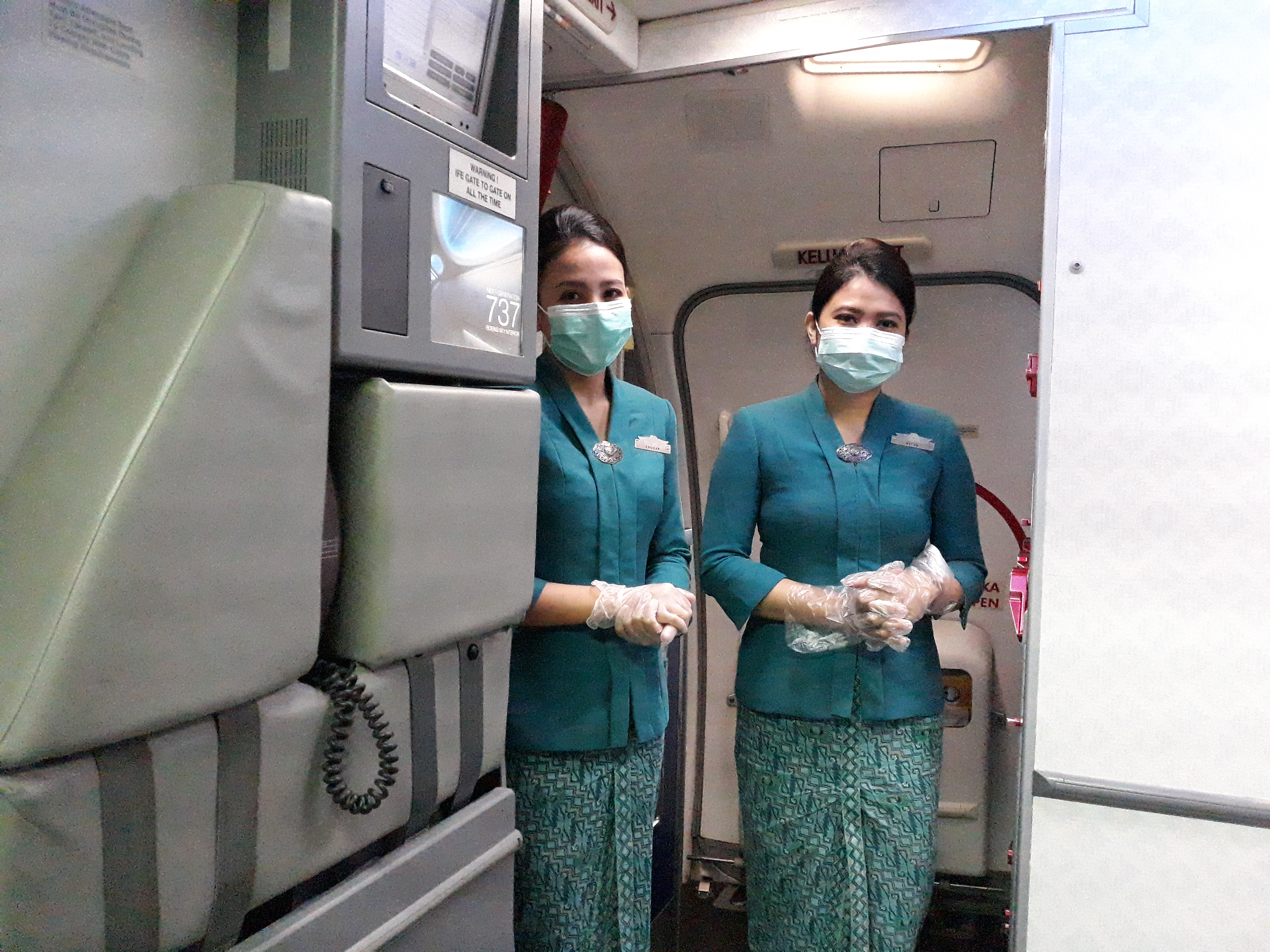
Garuda Indonesia flight attendants wearing masks during COVID-19 pandemic

On 14 May 2020, as a result of the COVID-19 pandemic and its impact on the aviation industry, Garuda Indonesia furloughed 800 of its staff for at least three months. In June, it laid off 180 contracted pilots. The airline implemented face masks for crew members following health regulations to prevent the spread of the disease. On 16 June 2020, after some passengers complained that they could not see the flight attendants' faces, Garuda president director Irfan Setiaputra said the airline was planning to replace face masks with face shields for its cabin crew. Three days later, in response to public criticism of the plan, he said Garuda's flight attendants would not stop using face masks.

==== Debt restructuring ====
The pandemic deepened Garuda's financial difficulties. By December 2021, the airline had reduced its workforce from 7,861 to about 5,400 and said its directors and commissioners had also taken pay cuts.

On 17 June 2022, creditors approved a restructuring agreement covering more than US$9 billion of debt. The Jakarta Commercial Court ratified the agreement on 27 June, allowing the airline to avoid bankruptcy. The plan included debt reductions and the exchange of claims for new bonds and shares.

In September 2022, Garuda Indonesia filed for US Chapter 15 bankruptcy protection.

=== Aircraft procurement corruption cases ===
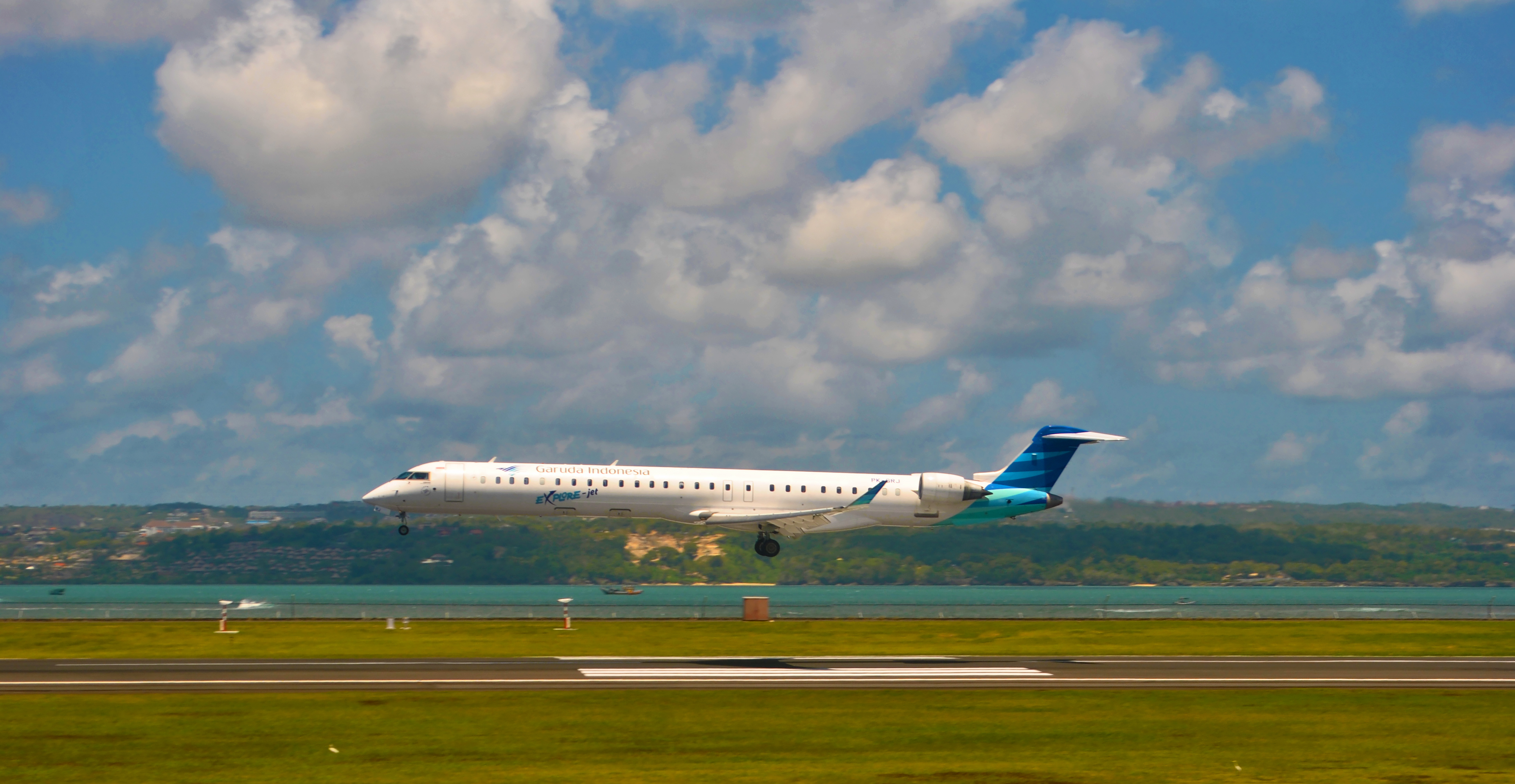
A Garuda Indonesia Bombardier CRJ-1000 in 2022. The aircraft type was among those involved in a procurement corruption case investigated by Indonesian authorities.

In May 2020, former president director Emirsyah Satar was sentenced to eight years in prison for bribery and money laundering connected with purchases of aircraft and engines from Airbus and Rolls-Royce.

In a separate case concerning the procurement of Bombardier CRJ1000 and ATR 72-600 aircraft, Satar was sentenced to five years in prison in July 2024. The sentence was increased to ten years on appeal. In July 2026, the Supreme Court rejected his application for judicial review, leaving the ten-year sentence in place.

=== Post-restructuring (2023–present) ===
In November 2025, shareholders approved a Rp23.67 trillion capital injection from Danantara Asset Management, comprising Rp17.02 trillion in cash and conversion of Rp6.65 trillion of shareholder loans into equity.

Garuda's audited consolidated accounts recorded revenue of US$3.217 billion and a net loss of US$319.39 million in 2025, compared with a US$69.78 million loss in 2024. The 2025 loss attributable to owners of the parent company was US$322.49 million. Year-end equity was positive US$91.91 million, compared with negative US$1.352 billion a year earlier.

In April 2026, CNA reported that aircraft maintenance and delays in obtaining spare parts had constrained Garuda's recovery. Its reporting also identified wider pressures on Indonesian airlines, including fuel costs and regulated domestic fares. That year, Skytrax reduced Garuda's rating from five stars to four, citing ageing cabin products and ground facilities.

== Corporate affairs and identity ==
=== Branding and livery ===
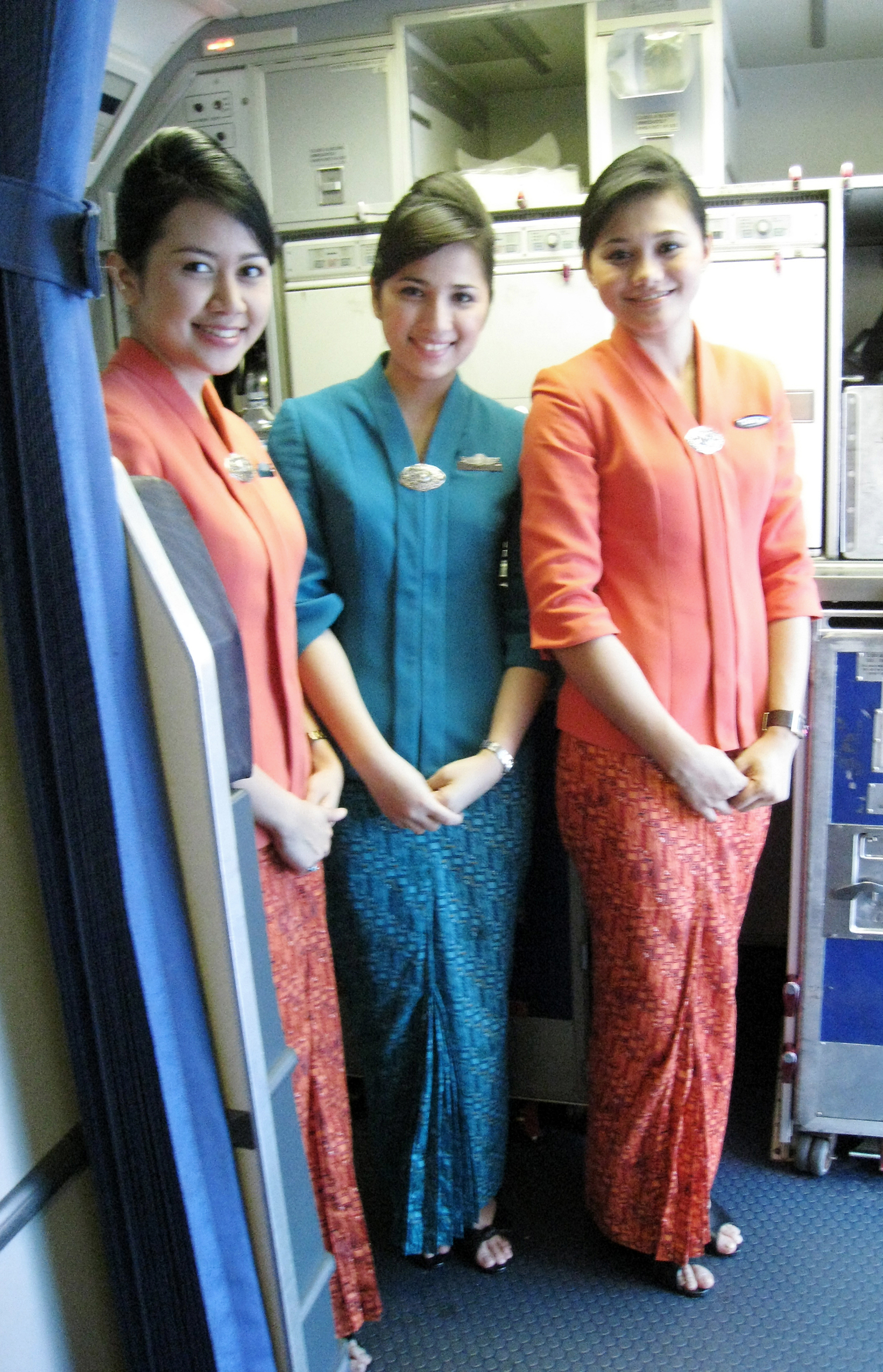
The new Garuda Indonesia flight attendant uniforms, featuring kebaya and parang gondosuli batik

Since its establishment, Garuda Indonesia has changed its branding and livery multiple times.

==== Original livery ====
During the airline's earliest years, Garuda's colour scheme was a simple "Indonesian Airways" logotype with blue lines running along the fuselage and the Indonesian flag on the horizontal stabilizer.

==== 1950s livery ====
During the airline's early years, Garuda's colour scheme was a simple "Garuda Indonesian Airways" logotype with red lines running along the fuselage and the Indonesian flag on the horizontal stabilizer.

==== 1960s rebranding ====
In the 1960s, Garuda introduced a red and white colour scheme following the Indonesian national identity and the Indonesian flag. Also during this period, the airline introduced a bird logo: a triangle-stylized eagle-like Garuda with a red and white shield. The logo was painted on the vertical stabiliser of Garuda's aircraft from 1961 to 1969.

==== 1969 rebranding ====
In 1969, a logotype with a unique font replaced the triangular eagle as Garuda's corporate identity, along with a new color scheme consisting of a red and orange "hockey stick" line running along the aircraft's windows and vertical stabilizer. This livery was used from 1969 to 1985.

==== 1985 rebranding ====
In 1985, Garuda underwent a complete branding makeover, changing its name into "Garuda Indonesia" along with its livery, logo and logotype. The new branding and livery were created by Landor Associates who also created the new logo: the Garuda symbol with five bent lines forming its wings. The color scheme was changed to a deep royal blue and aqua color, said to be inspired by the nature of Indonesia that was dominated by tropical greenery and seas when viewed from the air. The nationalistic red and white color scheme was no longer used.

==== 2009 rebranding ====
In 2009, a new branding initiative was launched through a new image, developed once again by brand consultant Landor Associates: a new spin of the idea called "nature's wing". Garuda has since replaced the old logo painted on its aircraft's vertical stabilizers with this new "nature's wing" graphic of blue and aqua shades. The "nature's wing" graphic was inspired by the wings of tropical birds as well as the ripples of waves upon the water. The bird symbol designed by Landor 24 years earlier is still maintained as Garuda Indonesia's logo, with minor changes, while the logotype now uses a customized font.

==== Special liveries ====
To celebrate its 62 years of service, on 26 January 2011, Garuda Indonesia painted 2 of its Boeing 737-800s with retro liveries the airline used in the 1960s and 1970s.

To raise awareness on wearing masks during the COVID-19 pandemic, Garuda Indonesia painted five of their aircraft with a surgical mask tied to its nose, with the words "Ayo pakai masker," meaning "Please wear masks," introduced on 1 October 2020. This is part of Indonesia's governmental responses to the pandemic, however, the design itself is from an ongoing competition Garuda launched called Fly Your Design Through The Sky, asking people to design masks to be painted in one of their planes.

Gallery of Garuda Indonesia logos

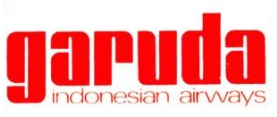
1969–1985

1985–2009

2009–present

Gallery of Garuda Indonesia liveries

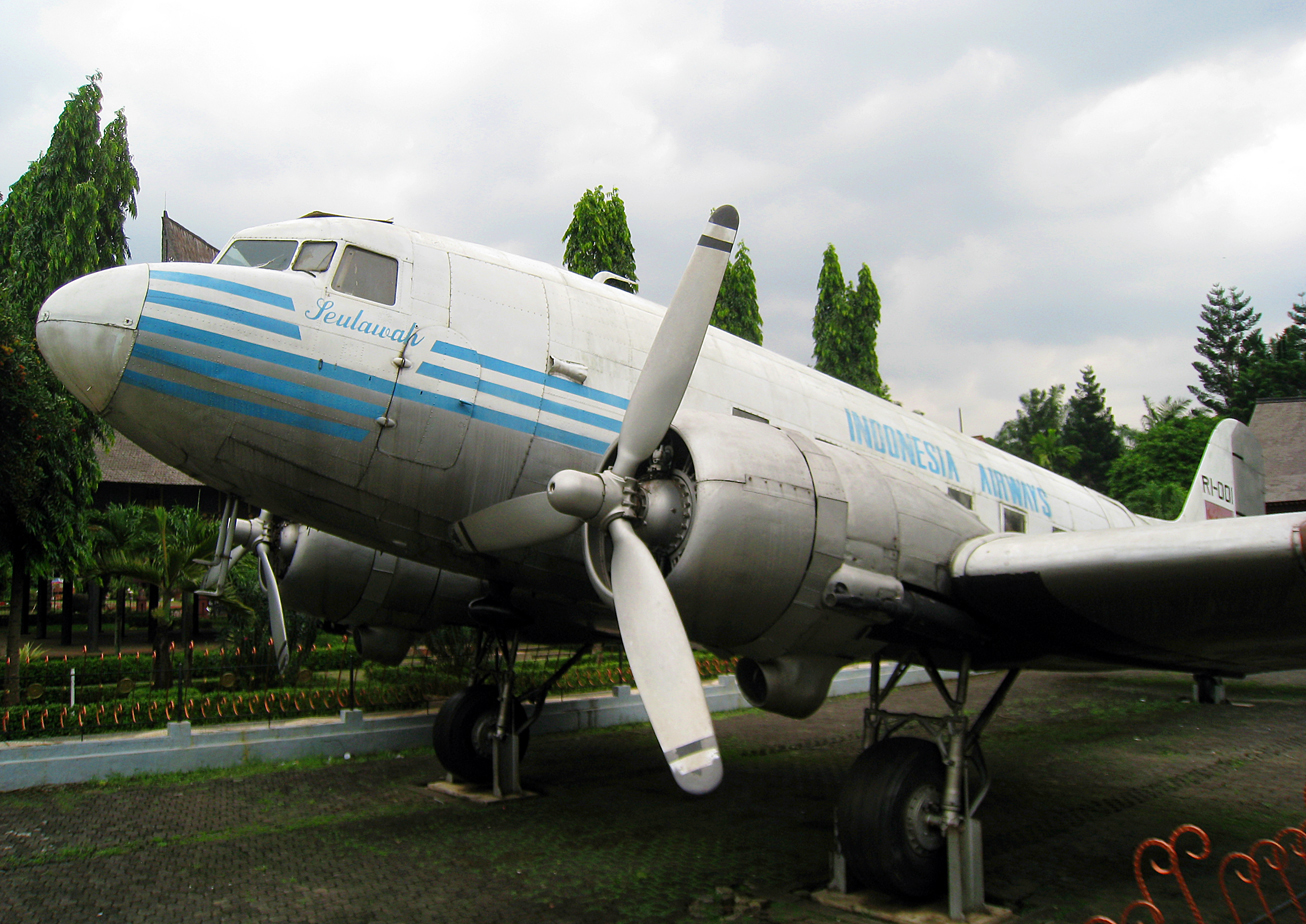
A Douglas DC-3 Seulawah RI-001 with the simple "Indonesia Airways" logotype, Indonesian flag, and blue lines (1949–1950)

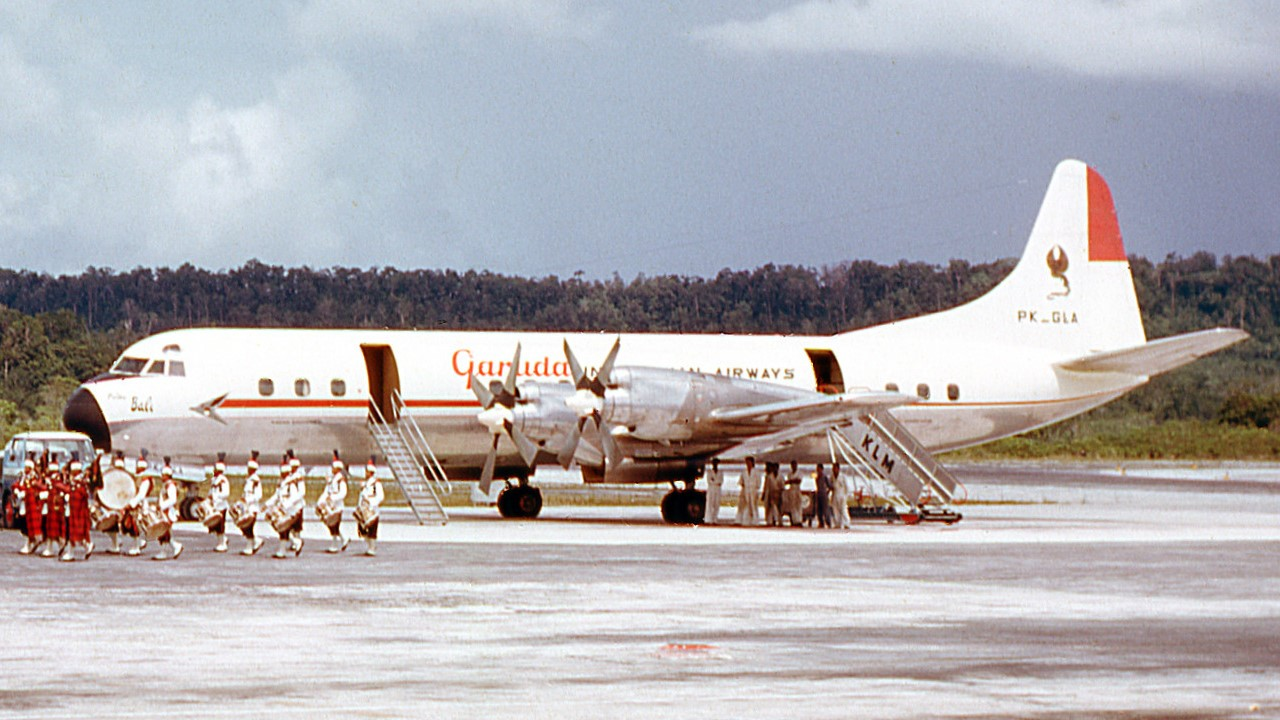
A Lockheed L-188 Electra in 1961 with the simple "Garuda Indonesia Airways" logotype, Indonesian flag, and red lines (1950–1961)

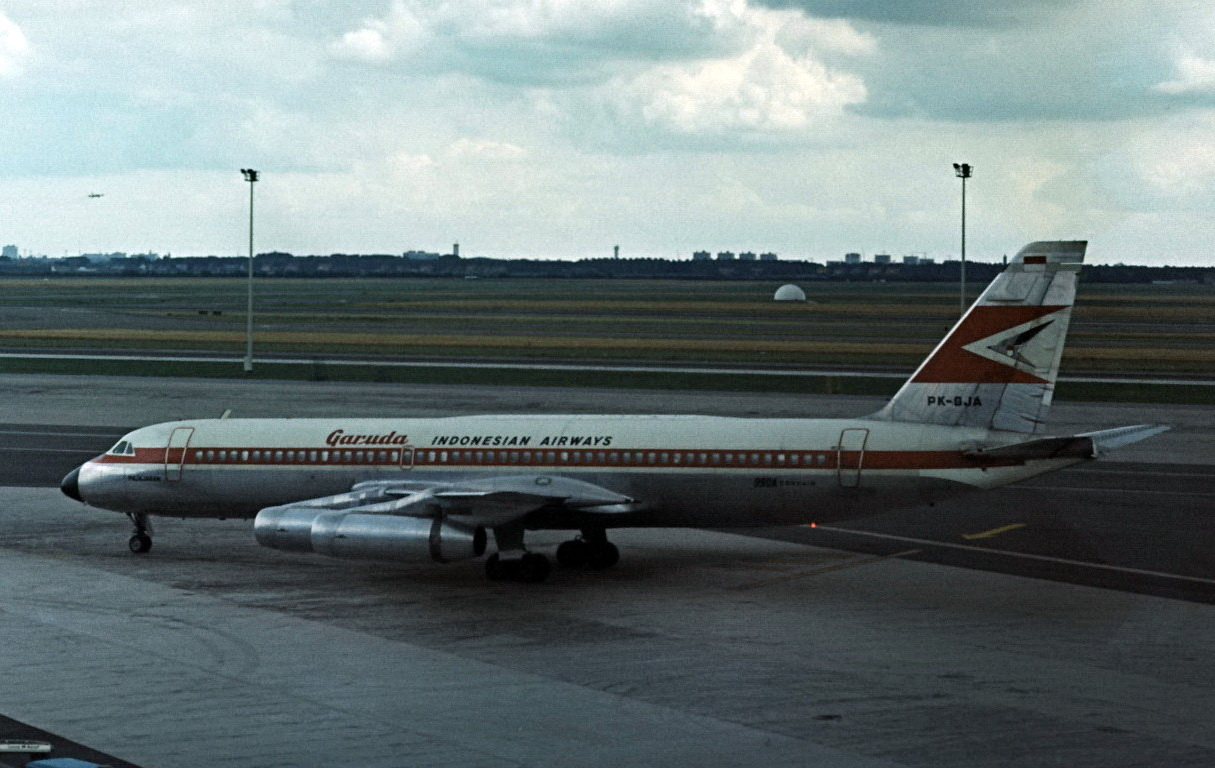
A Convair 990 at Amsterdam in 1968 with the Garuda triangular bird logo (1961–1969)

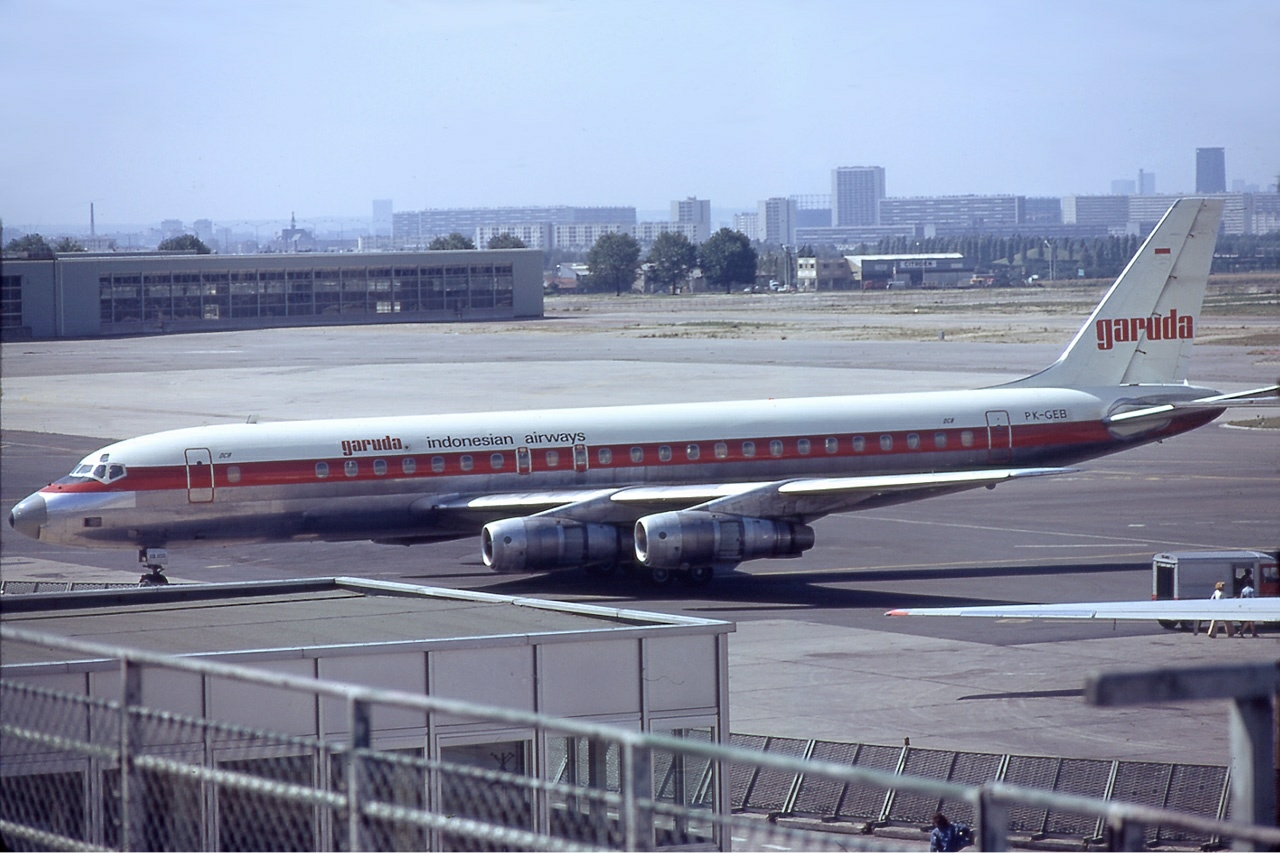
A McDonnell Douglas DC-8 in 1974 with the transition red and orange color scheme (1969–1985)

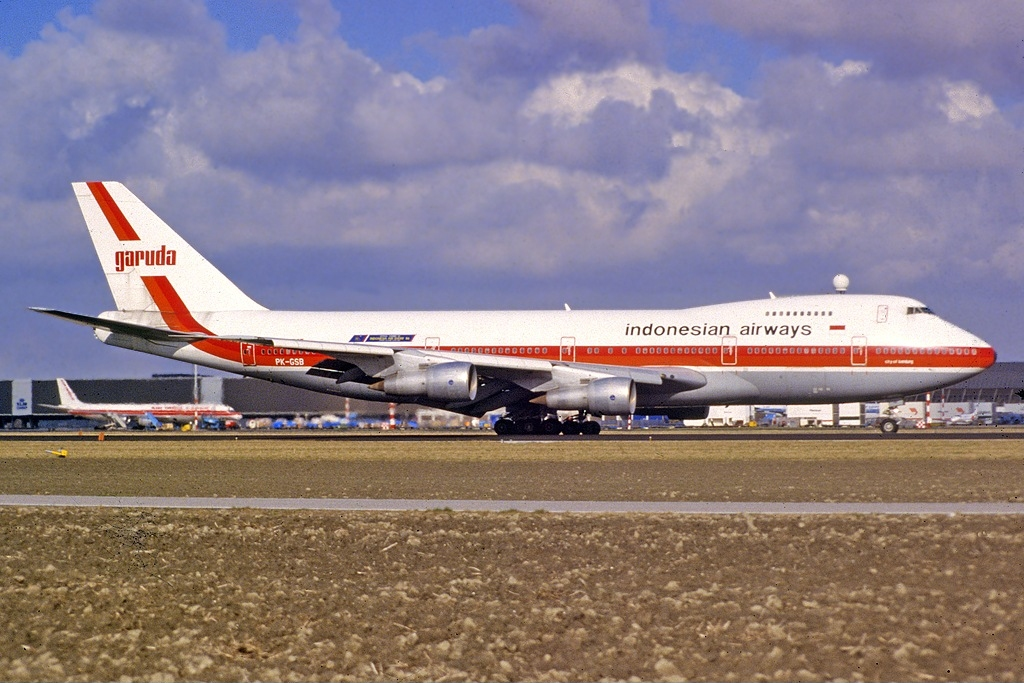
A Boeing 747-2U3B in 1986 with the red and orange color scheme (1969–1985)

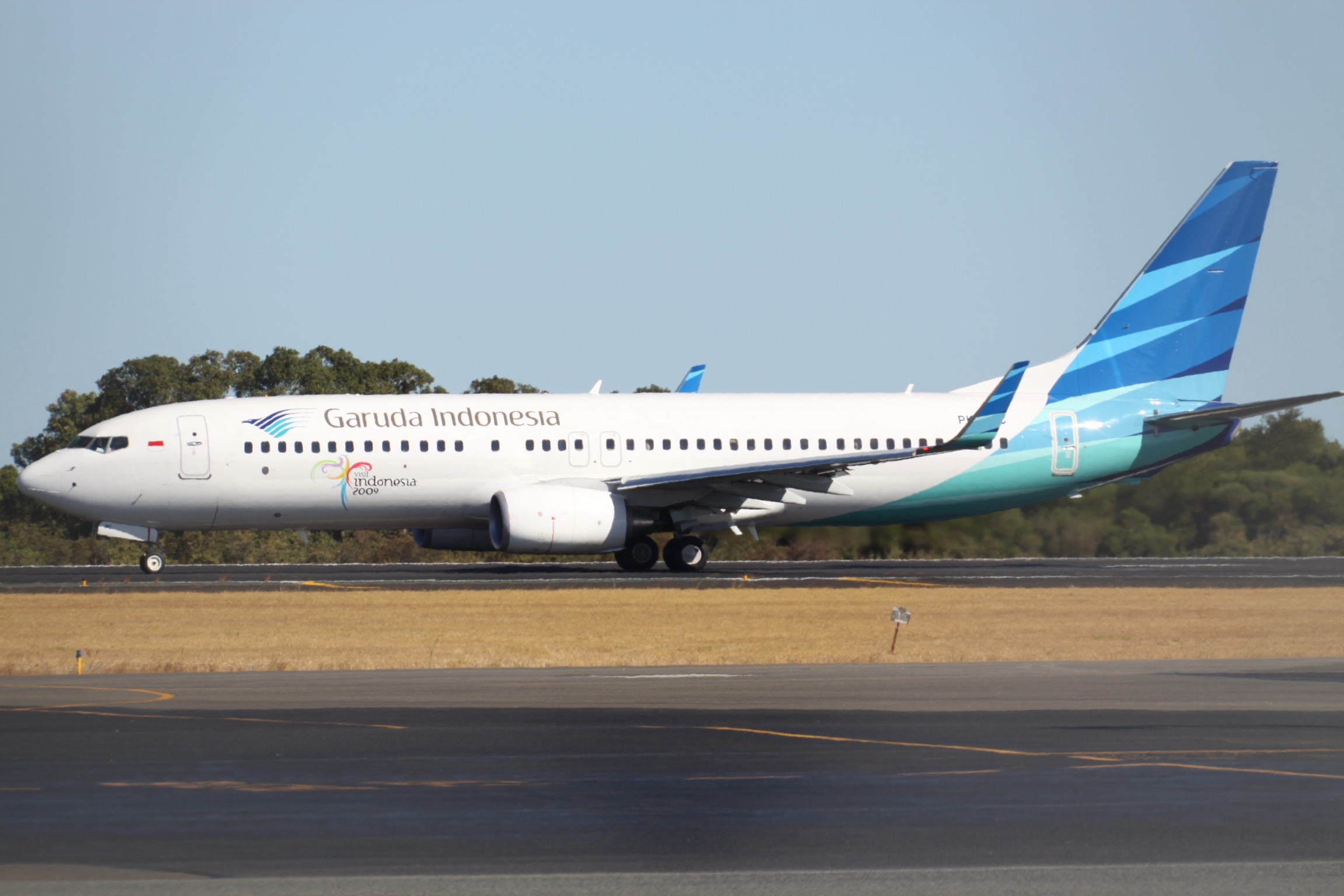
A Boeing 737-800 with the blue and white color scheme livery (2009–present)

This set of images shows the evolution of Garuda Indonesia's livery.

=== Head office ===
Garuda Indonesia has its head office at Soekarno–Hatta International Airport in Tangerang, Banten, Indonesia, near Cengkareng and near Jakarta. The head office is the Garuda Indonesia Management Building, located within the Garuda Indonesia City Center. The about 17,000-square-metre (180,000 sq ft) head office facility is on a 5-hectare (12-acre) plot of land. As of 2009, the head office houses the Garuda management and about 1,000 employees from various units. Indonesian President Susilo Bambang Yudhoyono opened the current Garuda head office in 2009. The previous head office was located in the city center of Jakarta, in Central Jakarta.

=== Ownership and stock-market listing ===
Garuda Indonesia began trading on the Indonesia Stock Exchange on 11 February 2011, with the Indonesian government retaining a majority stake. At 31 December 2025, PT Danantara Asset Management held 92.03% of its shares and PT Trans Airways held 1.80%. The Indonesian state retained a special Series A Dwiwarna share.

=== Subsidiaries ===
Garuda’s direct subsidiaries at 31 December 2025 were:

Company	Principal activities	Country	Garuda shareholding
PT Citilink Indonesia	Low-cost airline	Indonesia	99.99%
PT Garuda Maintenance Facility Aero Asia Tbk	Aircraft maintenance	Indonesia	27.44%
PT Aero Wisata	Catering, hotels, transport and travel services	Indonesia	99.99%
PT Sabre Travel Network Indonesia	Computer reservation services	Indonesia	95.00%
PT Aero Systems Indonesia	Information technology services	Indonesia	99.99%
Garuda Indonesia Holiday France S.A.S.	Travel agency	France	100.00%

The annual report classified PT Gapura Angkasa, in which Garuda held 45.62%, as an associate.

=== Cooperation ===
On 18 August 2018, Garuda Indonesia signed an MoU agreement with the cargo airline Jayawijaya Dirgantara relating to the distribution of cargo from Jayapura to Wamena.

=== Air cargo price-fixing case ===
On 30 May 2019, the Federal Court of Australia ordered Garuda to pay A$19 million for fixing air-freight fees and surcharges on services to Australia. The penalty comprised A$15 million for arrangements in Indonesia and A$4 million for arrangements in Hong Kong. The conduct occurred between 2003 and 2006. The case formed part of wider Australian Competition and Consumer Commission proceedings against 15 airlines, including Qantas, Air New Zealand and Singapore Airlines.

Garuda withdrew its appeal against the penalty in 2021. The court approved payment of the full penalty and a contribution to the commission’s costs in monthly instalments from December 2021 to December 2026.

== Destinations ==
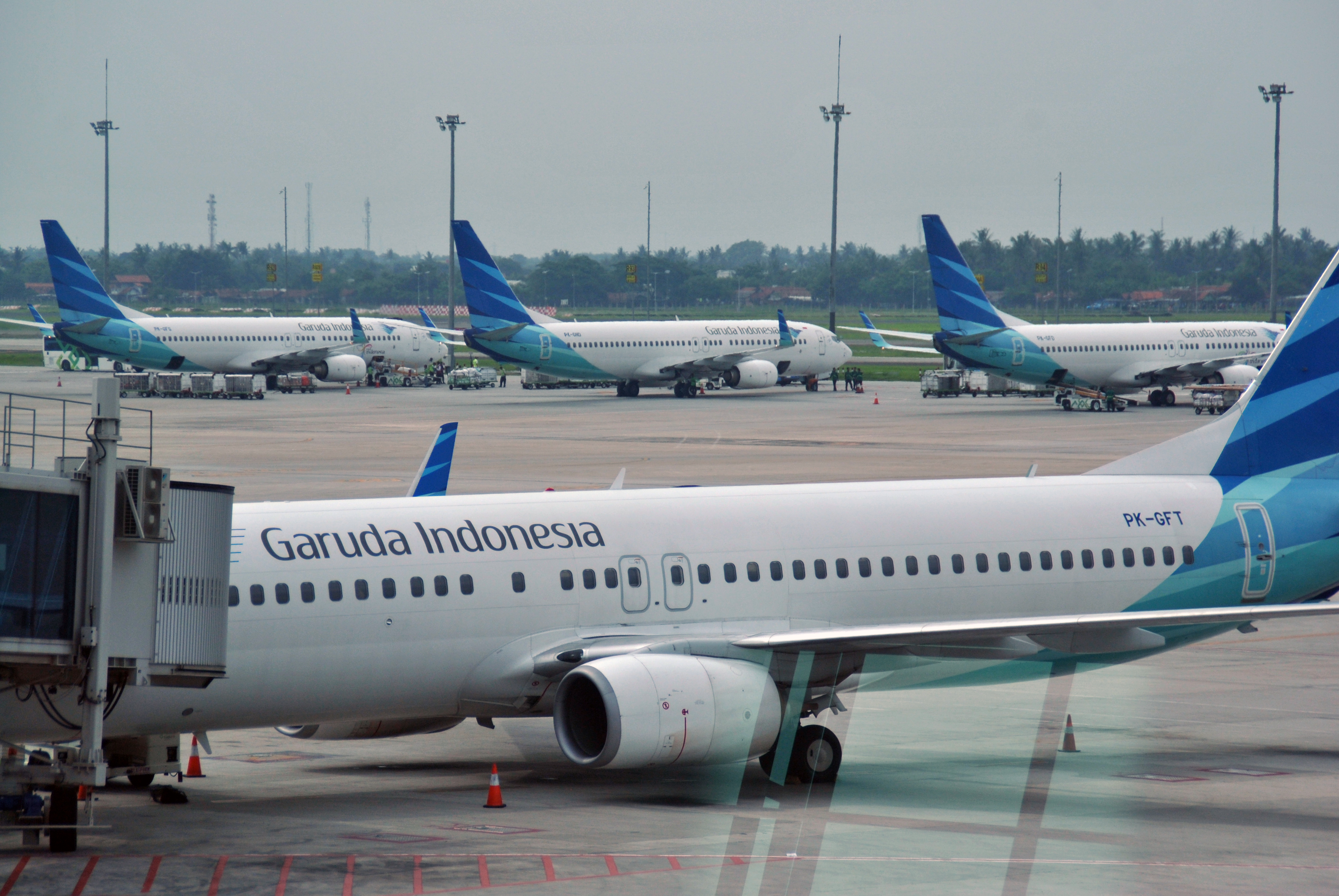
Garuda's Boeing 737-800s on stand at Terminal 3 of Soekarno–Hatta International Airport, which is the airline's main hub

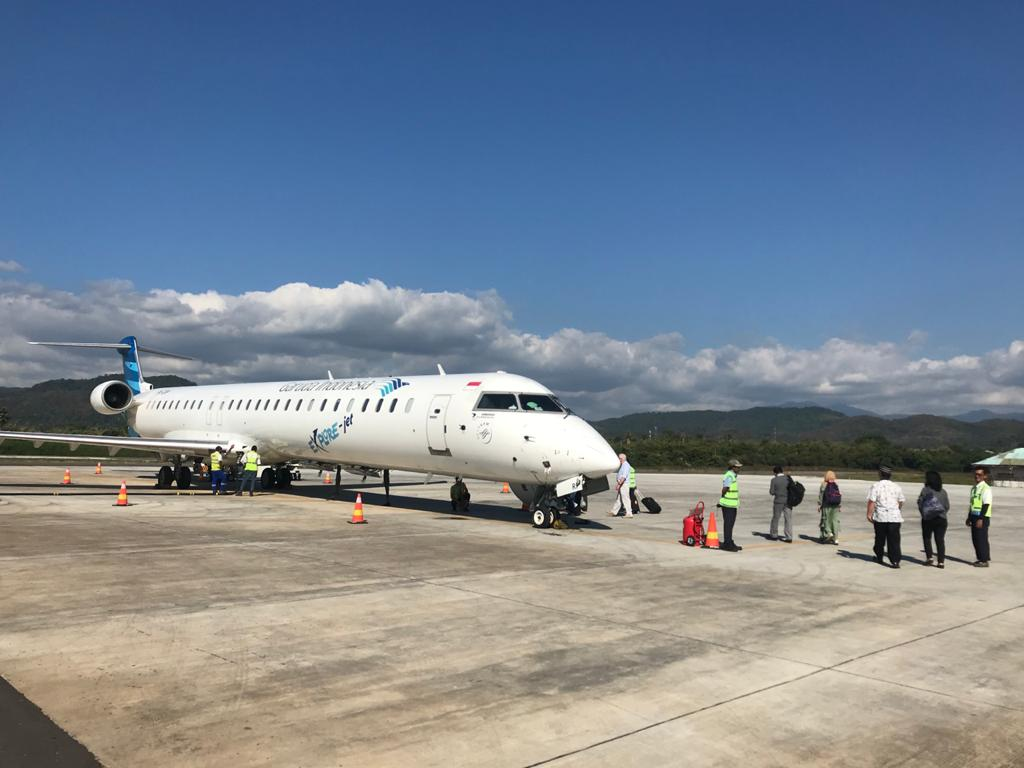
Garuda Indonesia Bombardier CRJ1000 at Komodo Airport

At the end of 2025, Garuda reported serving 38 domestic and 15 international destinations.

In June 2008, it was announced that Garuda Indonesia would increase services between Australia and Bali. From 25 June, Garuda Indonesia added an extra flight between Darwin and Denpasar, bringing the total number of services to three per week. Additionally, a fourth flight from Melbourne to Denpasar began on 22 July. On 2 September, another extra service departed from Melbourne to bring the total number of weekly flights to five and a sixth flight left from Sydney. This extra capacity was in response to an increase in the number of Australians who travelled to Bali in the first quarter of 2008, marking a resurgence in Balinese tourism, which was hit hard by the 2002 and 2005 Bali bombings.

On 13 October 2009, Garuda announced it would resume flights to Europe for the first time since its removal from the E.U. blacklist. It commenced flights between Jakarta and Amsterdam in June 2010, initially with a refuelling stop in Dubai. On 2 December 2012, after agreeing to a codeshare agreement with Etihad Airways, Garuda changed the refueling stop to Abu Dhabi. After taking delivery of Boeing 777-300ER aircraft in 2013, the airline removed the Abu Dhabi refuelling stop and commenced non-stop service to Amsterdam in May 2014, as the longest flight Garuda operated, and consequently ending flights to Abu Dhabi, leaving Etihad as the sole operator between Jakarta and Abu Dhabi. On 8 September 2014, the airline extended its Amsterdam flight with continuing service to London Gatwick.

In 2011, Garuda flew 17.1 million passengers, up 39% from the previous year, while the total revenue jumped 38% to Rp27.1 trillion ($2.95 billion). The composition of passengers on domestic and international routes was 81% versus 19% respectively.

On 31 March 2016, Garuda Indonesia inaugurated its first flight from Singapore Changi Airport to London Heathrow, using a Boeing 777-300ER.

In mid 2016, Garuda announced its intention to resume service to Mumbai from Jakarta. The service began on 12 December 2016 via Bangkok using Boeing 737-800NG.

In August 2018, Garuda Indonesia announced that the airline would end flights to London Heathrow by October, although it then resumed flights in December with a dual-class Boeing 777-300ER in the same year. 2019 marked further adjustments to Garuda's flight to London Heathrow as the airline announced a Jakarta-London Heathrow, London Heathrow-Denpasar routing.

=== Joint ventures ===
In addition to the above codeshares, Garuda Indonesia has entered into joint ventures with the following airlines:

- Japan Airlines
- Saudia
- Singapore Airlines

=== Codeshare agreements ===
Garuda Indonesia has codeshare agreements with the following airlines:

- Aeroméxico
- Air Europa
- Air France
- Bangkok Airways
- China Airlines
- China Eastern Airlines
- Citilink (subsidiary)
- Delta Air Lines
- Emirates
- Etihad Airways
- IndiGo
- Kenya Airways
- KLM
- Korean Air
- Malaysia Airlines
- Oman Air
- Philippine Airlines
- Qatar Airways
- Scandinavian Airlines
- Turkish Airlines
- Vietnam Airlines
- XiamenAir

=== Proposed codeshare with Qantas ===
In September 2023, Qantas applied to Australia’s International Air Services Commission for permission for Garuda to market Qantas-operated flights between Sydney and Melbourne and Jakarta and Denpasar under a codeshare agreement. Qantas argued that the proposal would give Garuda customers additional departure times and travel options. Sydney Airport and Virgin Australia opposed the application, citing competition concerns.

In an April 2024 draft decision, the commission proposed refusing the application, considering the consumer benefits limited and the potential reduction in competition likely to result in higher fares than without the arrangement. On 9 May 2024, the commission reported that Qantas had withdrawn its application because of changed operational circumstances.

=== Explore and Explore-jet sub-brands ===
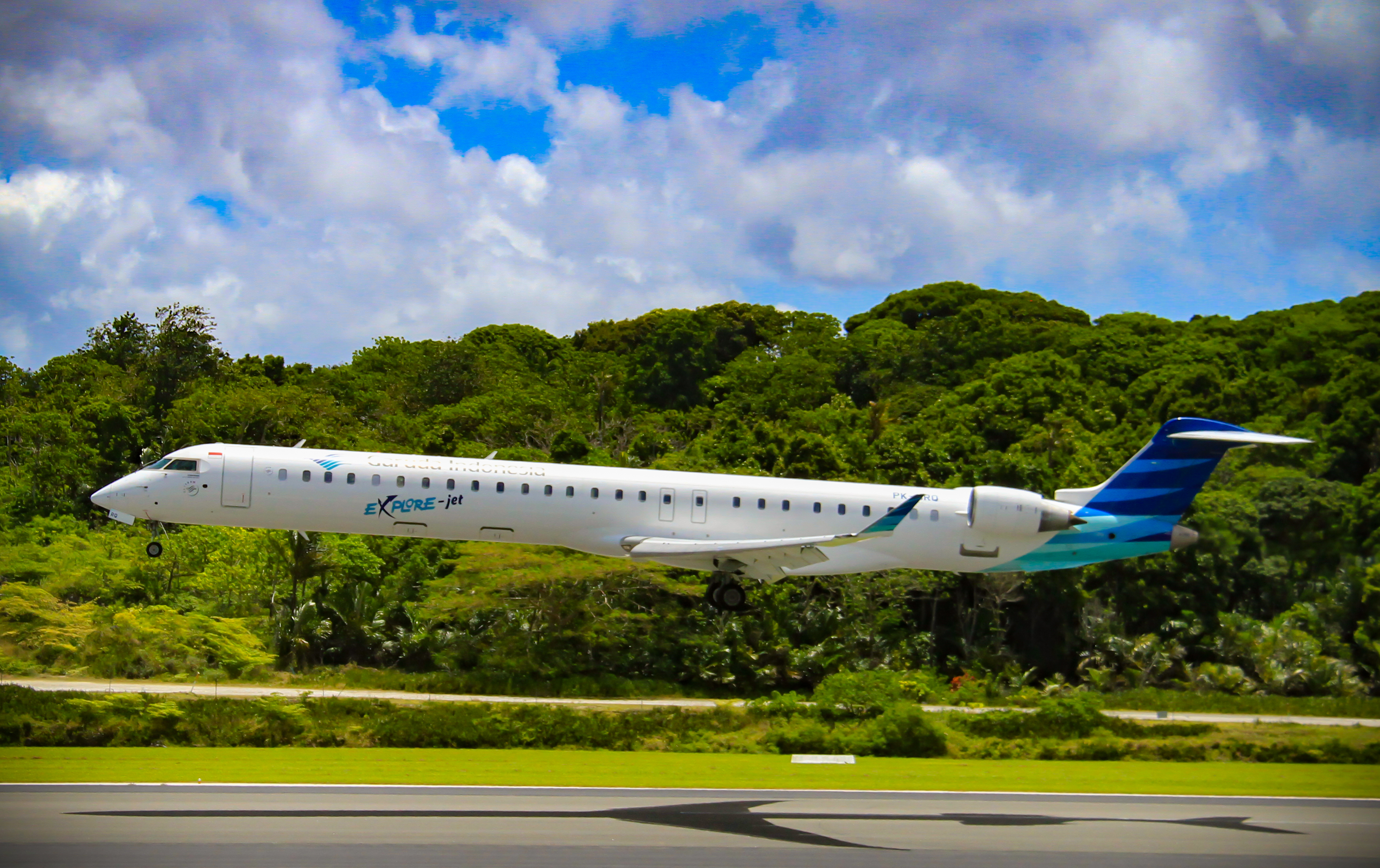
A Bombardier CRJ1000 of Garuda Indonesia Explore-jet landing at Christmas Island Airport on its weekly service from Jakarta (February 2017)

As part of its regional expansion, Garuda introduced the Explore brand for ATR 72-600 services in November 2013, alongside Explore-jet for its Bombardier CRJ1000 operations. The smaller aircraft were intended to serve regional airports from hubs including Denpasar, Makassar and Medan.

Garuda returned its CRJ1000 fleet to lessors during 2022 and 2023.

=== SkyTeam ===
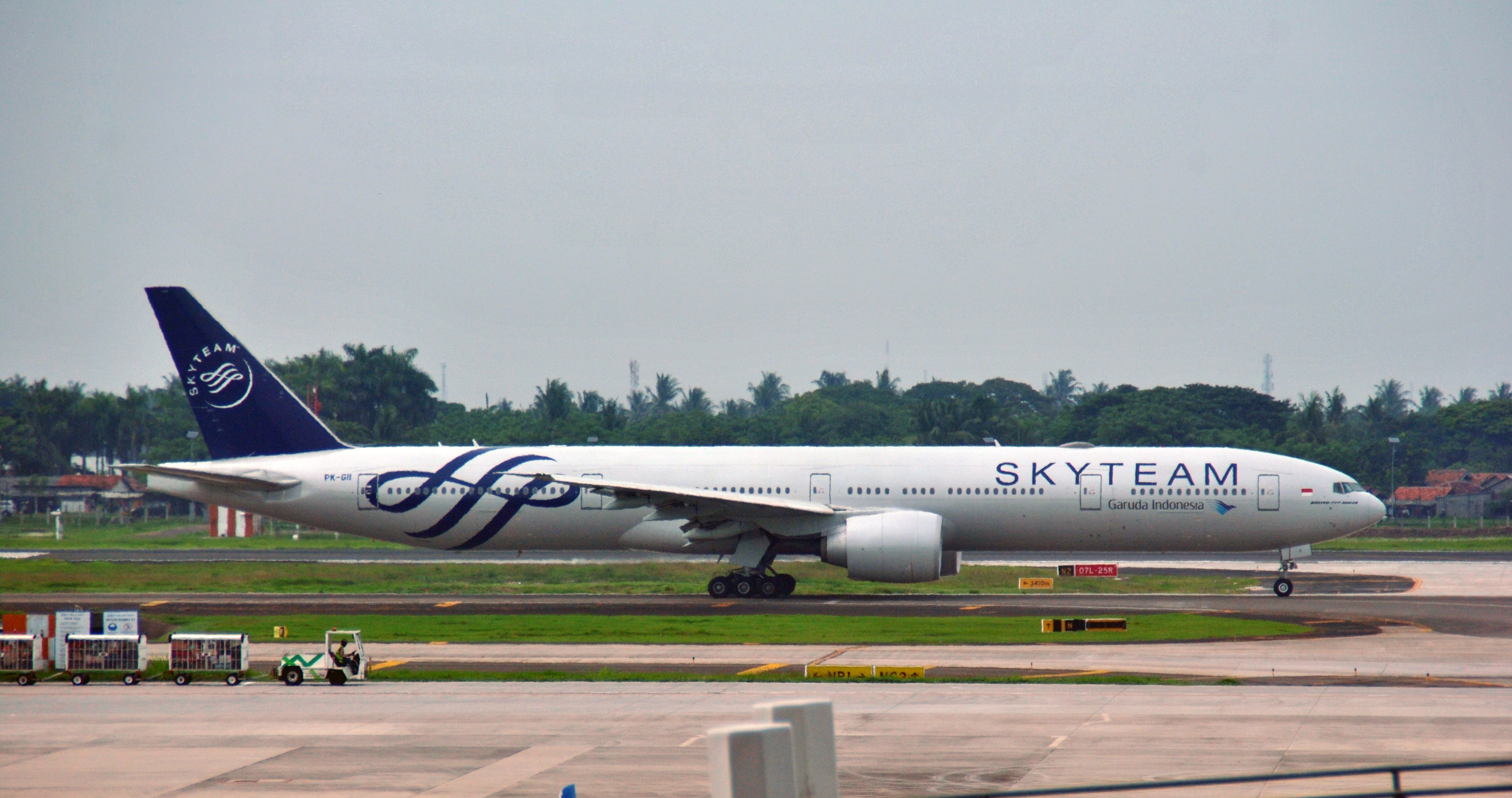
A Garuda Indonesia Boeing 777-300ER (PK-GII) taxiing at Soekarno-Hatta International Airport. The aircraft is wearing the SkyTeam livery to represent Garuda's membership within SkyTeam Airline Alliance.

In 2009, Garuda Indonesia expressed an interest in joining the SkyTeam airline alliance, which would make it the second airline in Southeast Asia to participate after Vietnam Airlines. Membership would open SkyTeam's network to Indonesian, Australian, and New Zealand markets, which it lacked connectivity to. In December 2009, three SkyTeam members – Korean Air, KLM, and Delta Air Lines (China Airlines joined as fourth member to support Garuda after its 2011 SkyTeam inclusion) – committed to supporting Garuda Indonesia to join SkyTeam. This made Garuda Indonesia eligible to apply for membership in the alliance. On 23 November 2010, Garuda Indonesia signed an agreement to join SkyTeam. However instead of the usual 18–24 months to complete membership formalities, shortcomings with its IT system delayed Garuda's entry. After a 40-month process, the airline eventually became the 20th member of the alliance on 5 March 2014, two years after the original target date.

The inclusion of Garuda Indonesia added 40 new destinations to SkyTeam's global network and strengthened the alliance presence in Southeast Asia and Australia. To commemorate the event, the airline repainted an Airbus A330-300, a Boeing 737-800, and a Bombardier CRJ1000 with SkyTeam livery. In addition to repainted aircraft, a Boeing 777-300ER was delivered with SkyTeam livery.

Membership introduced SkyPriority services and reciprocal frequent-flyer benefits with other participating airlines.

== Fleet ==
The Boeing customer code for Garuda Indonesia is U3, which appears on its aircraft designations as an infix, such as 737-8U3, 777-3U3ER, and 747-2U3B.

Garuda Indonesia's mainline fleet consists of Airbus A330 and Boeing 777-300ER for wide-body aircraft and Boeing 737-800 and Boeing 737 MAX 8 for narrow-body aircraft.

At the Paris Air Show in 2015, Garuda Indonesia signed a Letter of Intent (LoI) to purchase 80 new aircraft from Boeing and Airbus (30 737 MAX, 20 787 Dreamliner, 30 A350 XWB) worth $20 billion at list prices Garuda also signed a LoI for 14 Airbus A330-900s aircraft (including seven cancellations from existing A330-300 orders), first reported during the Singapore Airshow 2016, confirming the order on 19 April 2016.

On 5 October 2017, Garuda operated its last Boeing 747 service after the last aircraft touched down in Makassar from Medina, a returning Hajj flight. It was then ferried to Jakarta the following day for retirement.

In January 2019, CEO Ari Askhara stated that the airline was considering and negotiating with lessors for a switch of 34 out of the remaining 49 Boeing 737 MAXes on order to the larger MAX 10 variant, as the airline was planning to resume 737 MAX deliveries by 2020. In March 2019, the airline decided to cancel its outstanding orders for 49 Boeing 737 MAX aircraft, citing a loss of passenger confidence in the type after the crashes of Lion Air Flight 610 and Ethiopian Airlines Flight 302. In November 2020, the airline clarified that its Boeing 737 MAX order had not yet been cancelled and that discussions with Boeing were continuing. In July 2025, Garuda said it was in talks to acquire up to 75 Boeing aircraft, including 737 MAX and 787 aircraft.

In July 2025, Indonesia announced a planned purchase of 50 Boeing aircraft as part of trade negotiations with the United States. Models and delivery details had not been disclosed at the time.

=== Current fleet ===
As of October 2026, Garuda Indonesia operates the following aircraft:

Garuda Indonesia fleet
Aircraft	In service	Orders	Passengers				Notes
Aircraft	In service	Orders	F	C	Y	Total	Notes
Airbus A330-200	2	—	—	36	186	222	
Airbus A330-200	2	—	—	18	242	260	
Airbus A330-300	10	—	—	36	215	251	
Airbus A330-300	10	—	—	24	263	287	
Airbus A330-900	5	9	—	24	277	291	Deliveries from 2019.
Boeing 737-800	48	—	—	12	150	162	
Boeing 737-800	48	—	—	8	153	161	
Boeing 737 MAX 8	1	49	—	12	162	174	5 Boeing 737 Max 8 Deliveries from 2027
Boeing 777-300ER	8	2	8	38	268	314	
Boeing 777-300ER	8	2	—	26	367	393	
Boeing 787-9	—	25	TBA				Deliveries from 2029
Total	74	85					

=== Former fleet ===
Aircraft types previously operated by Garuda include:

- Airbus A300B4
- ATR 72-600
- Boeing 737-300
- Boeing 737-400
- Boeing 737-500
- Boeing 747-200
- Boeing 747-400
- Bombardier CRJ1000
- Convair CV-340
- Convair CV-440
- Convair 990 Coronado
- de Havilland Heron
- Douglas DC-3
- Douglas DC-8
- Fokker F27 Friendship
- Fokker F28 Fellowship
- Lockheed L-188 Electra
- McDonnell Douglas DC-9
- McDonnell Douglas DC-10
- MD-11

Earlier aircraft included Catalina amphibians and Convair 240s.

== Services ==
Garuda Indonesia is a full-service airline featuring economy, business and first classes. The airline began to introduce new premium products and services with the arrival of the Airbus A330-200 and Boeing 737-800 aircraft. First class cabins were introduced in 2013 on board the Boeing 777-300ER with Wi-Fi and telecommunication services on board.

=== Cabin ===
==== First Class ====
Garuda introduced first class on its Boeing 777-300ER in 2013. The cabin had eight suites in a 1–2–1 arrangement, with sliding doors and seats that converted into beds.

==== Business Class ====
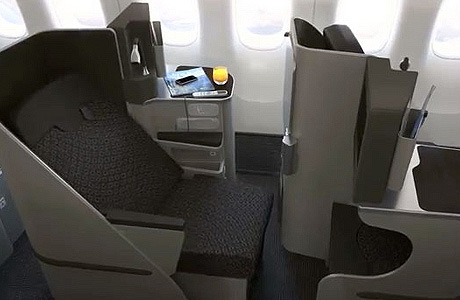
Garuda Indonesia Boeing 777-300ER Business Class

Garuda’s Boeing 777-300ER business class cabin was introduced with flat-bed seats in a staggered 1–2–1 layout, giving each passenger direct aisle access.

Four A330-300s introduced from 2016 featured the B/E Super Diamond business class seat, featuring all-aisle access, in a staggered 1-2-1 configuration, a 180-degree recline, more storage space, a new 16-inch entertainment screen, and touchscreen seat controls, along with a Panasonic eX3 inflight entertainment system.

Other Airbus A330 cabins have used business-class seats in a 2–2–2 layout, while Boeing 737 business-class seating has used a 2–2 arrangement.

==== Economy Class ====
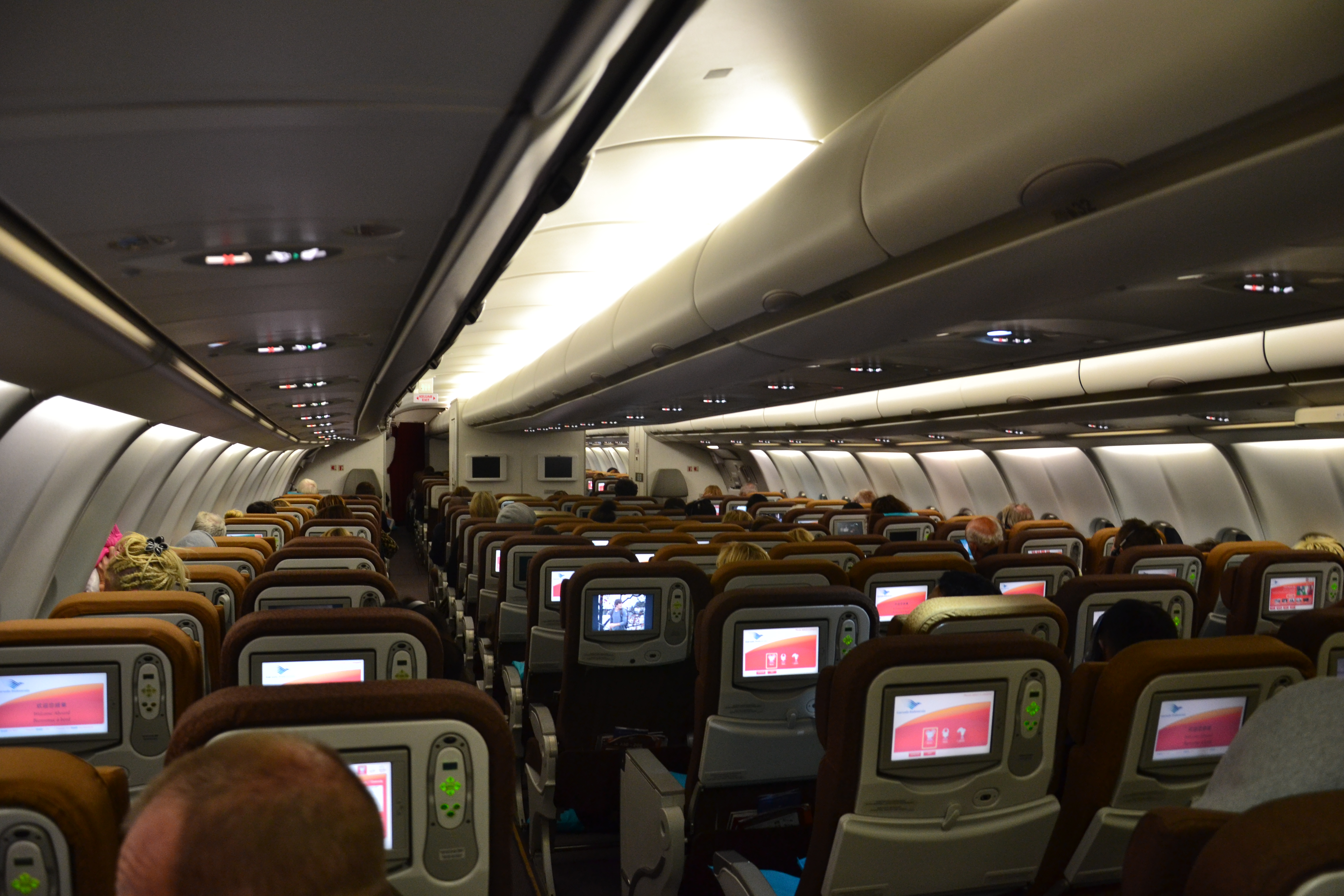
Garuda Indonesia A330-200 older Economy Class

Garuda’s economy cabins have used 3–3 seating on Boeing 737s, 2–4–2 seating on Airbus A330s and 3–3–3 seating on Boeing 777s.

=== Old cabins ===
==== ESCort (Economy Sleeping Comfort) ====
ESCort (Economy Sleeping Comfort) was a service introduced by Garuda in 2019 exclusively on its flights to and from London-Heathrow. In ESCort class, passengers could use three whole economy class seats for themselves. The airline provided a mattress, pillow, and duvet cover along with business class meals and amenities for passengers travelling in this class. Passengers were allowed to lie down on the three seats during the flight.

==== Premium Economy ====
Premium Economy was the second onboard class service that Garuda Indonesia introduced in 2019 as it marked its maiden flight from London Heathrow to Denpasar, Bali. The Premium Economy class gave travelling couples an extra empty seat in the regular Economy class cabin. Passengers in Premium Economy could also receive a 40 kg (88 lb) checked baggage allowance along with a business class meal and amenity kit.

=== In-flight entertainment ===
Garuda’s cabin refurbishment programme included audio and video on demand entertainment. Four A330-300 aircraft introduced from 2016 were fitted with Panasonic eX3 systems, with 11-inch screens in economy and 16-inch screens in business class.

=== Immigration On-Board (IoB) ===
Immigration on Board (IoB) was a special service created by Garuda Indonesia to provide more convenience for passengers travelling to Indonesia. With this service, in cooperation with the Directorate General of Immigration, an agency under the Indonesian Ministry of Law and Human Rights, Garuda Indonesia passengers on certain long-haul flights could complete their immigration process on-board before landing and disembarking.

By using this service, Garuda Indonesia passengers did not have to queue at the immigration counter upon arrival at Ngurah Rai International Airport in Denpasar or Soekarno–Hatta International Airport in Jakarta. The service ended in January 2015.

=== Ticketing ===
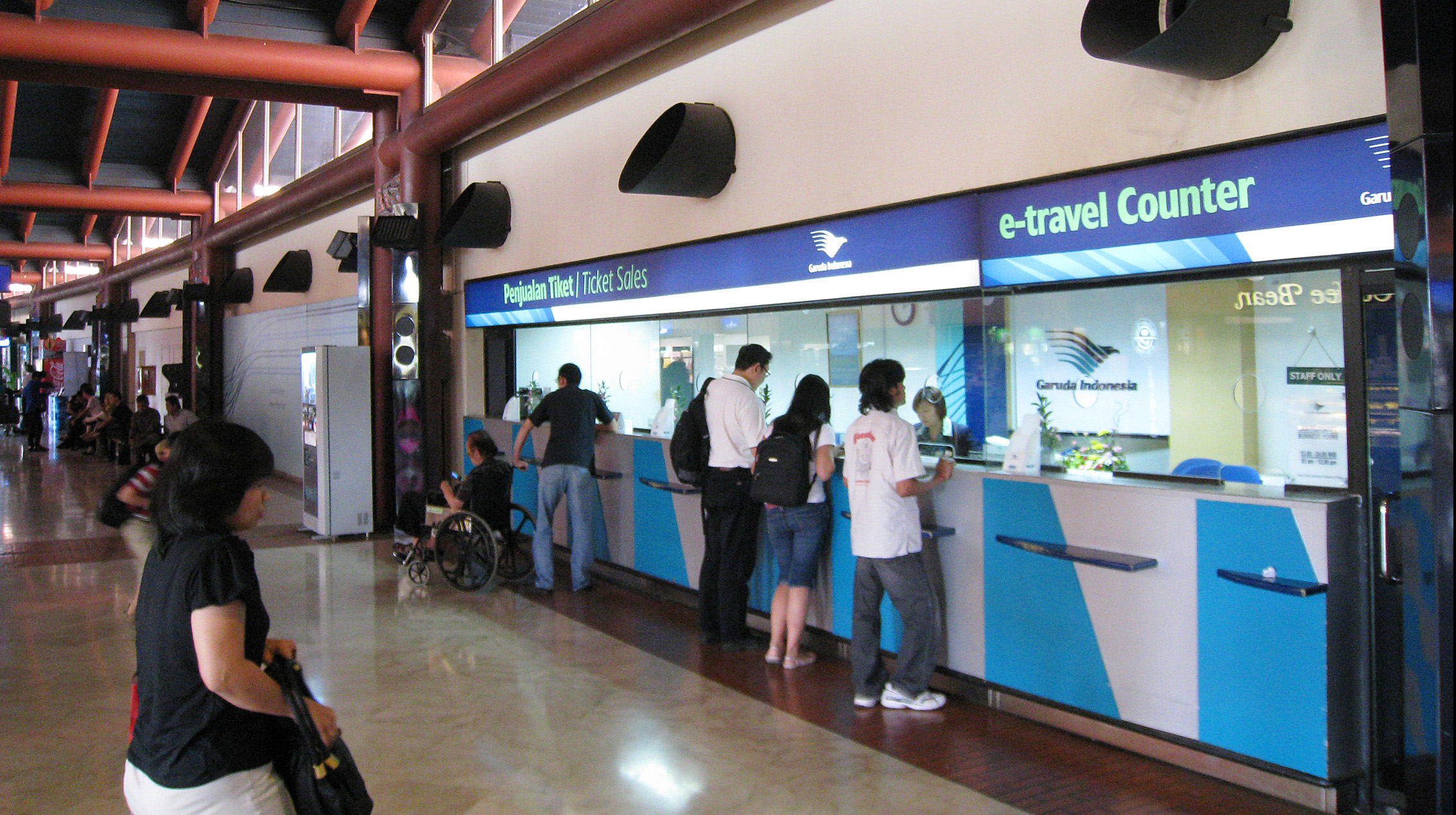
Former Garuda Indonesia ticket sales counter at Soekarno–Hatta International Airport Terminal 2

In April 2011, Garuda Indonesia announced plans to develop online sales. Garuda Indonesia had cooperated with Visa and MasterCard to develop an online credit card payment system, allowing customers to use PayPal. The announced payment arrangements included debit cards issued by Bank Mandiri, BCA or BII.

== Frequent-flyer program ==
GarudaMiles logo

Garuda Frequent Flyer, Garuda Indonesia's frequent-flyer program was launched in September 1999. In 2005, Garuda Indonesia relaunched its Garuda Frequent Flyer (GFF) with a new look, benefits and services. The new program allowed members to earn miles on domestic and international flights and had four adult membership tiers—Blue, Silver, Gold and Platinum—and a Junior membership. In June 2011, Garuda Indonesia launched a joint frequent flyer program with Korean Air. The cooperation enabled members of the Garuda Frequent Flyer (GFF) program and Korean Air's SkyPass program to accrue mileage for flying both Korean Air and Garuda or any Garuda–Korean Air codeshare flights.

From 27 March 2014, due to joining SkyTeam, Garuda Indonesia announced that Garuda Frequent Flyer renamed as GarudaMiles. In 2017, Citilink's frequent-flyer program, Supergreen, merged with GarudaMiles, dubbed 'Supergreen GarudaMiles', before merging fully with GarudaMiles. GarudaMiles also served Citilink until 21 March 2024. Citilink introduced its LinkMiles programme in 2021 and separated it from GarudaMiles in 2024.

As of 2025, besides Garuda and SkyTeam members, GarudaMiles members can earn and spend their miles with non-alliance members Emirates and Etihad Airways, Oneworld members Qatar Airways and Japan Airlines, and Star Alliance member Singapore Airlines. GarudaMiles members were previously able to earn and spend miles with India's Jet Airways before Jet's demise in 2019. They were also previously able to earn miles from Alitalia flights before the carrier's demise in 2021.

=== Lounge ===
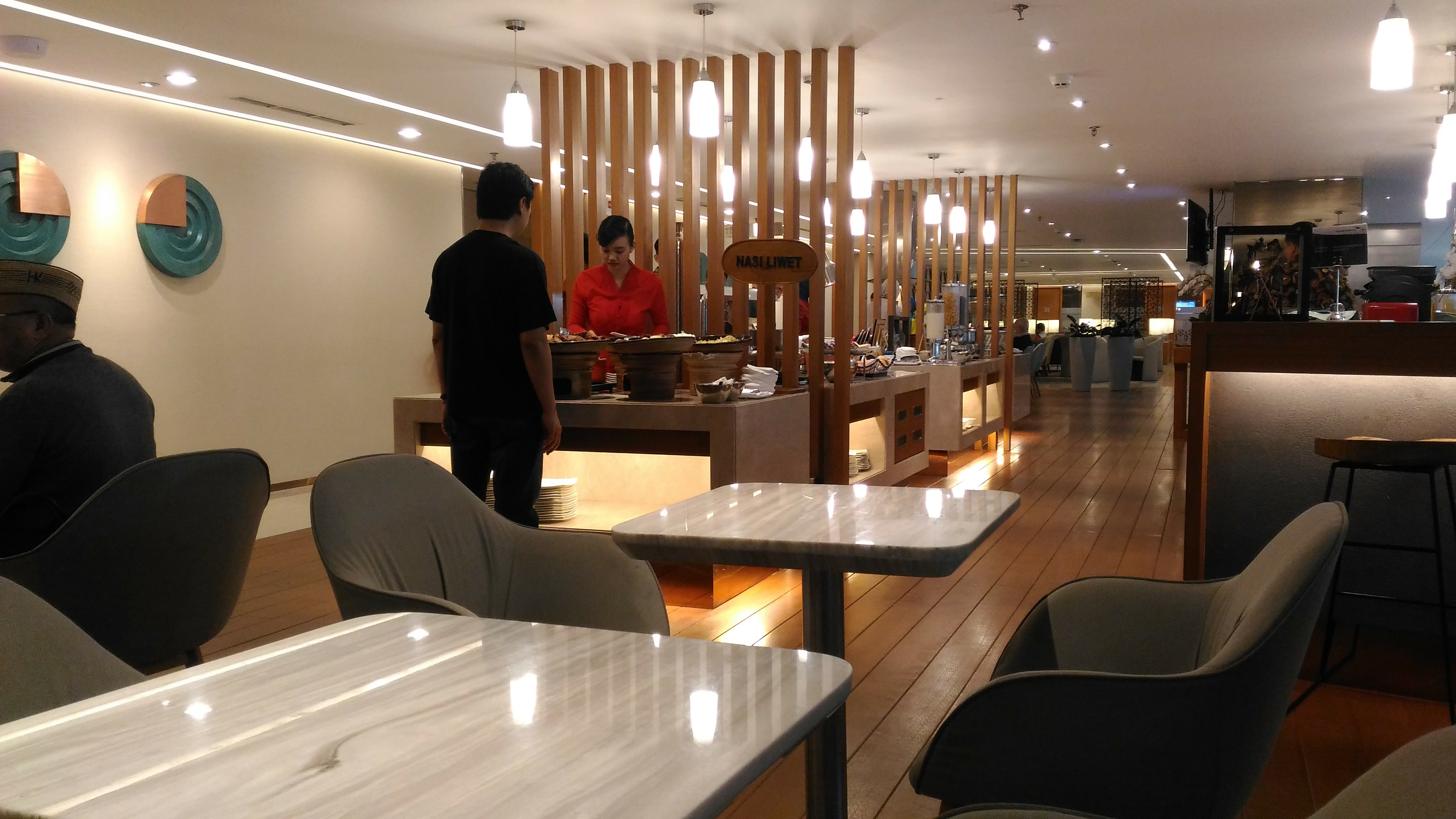
Business Lounge at Terminal 3 of Soekarno-Hatta Airport

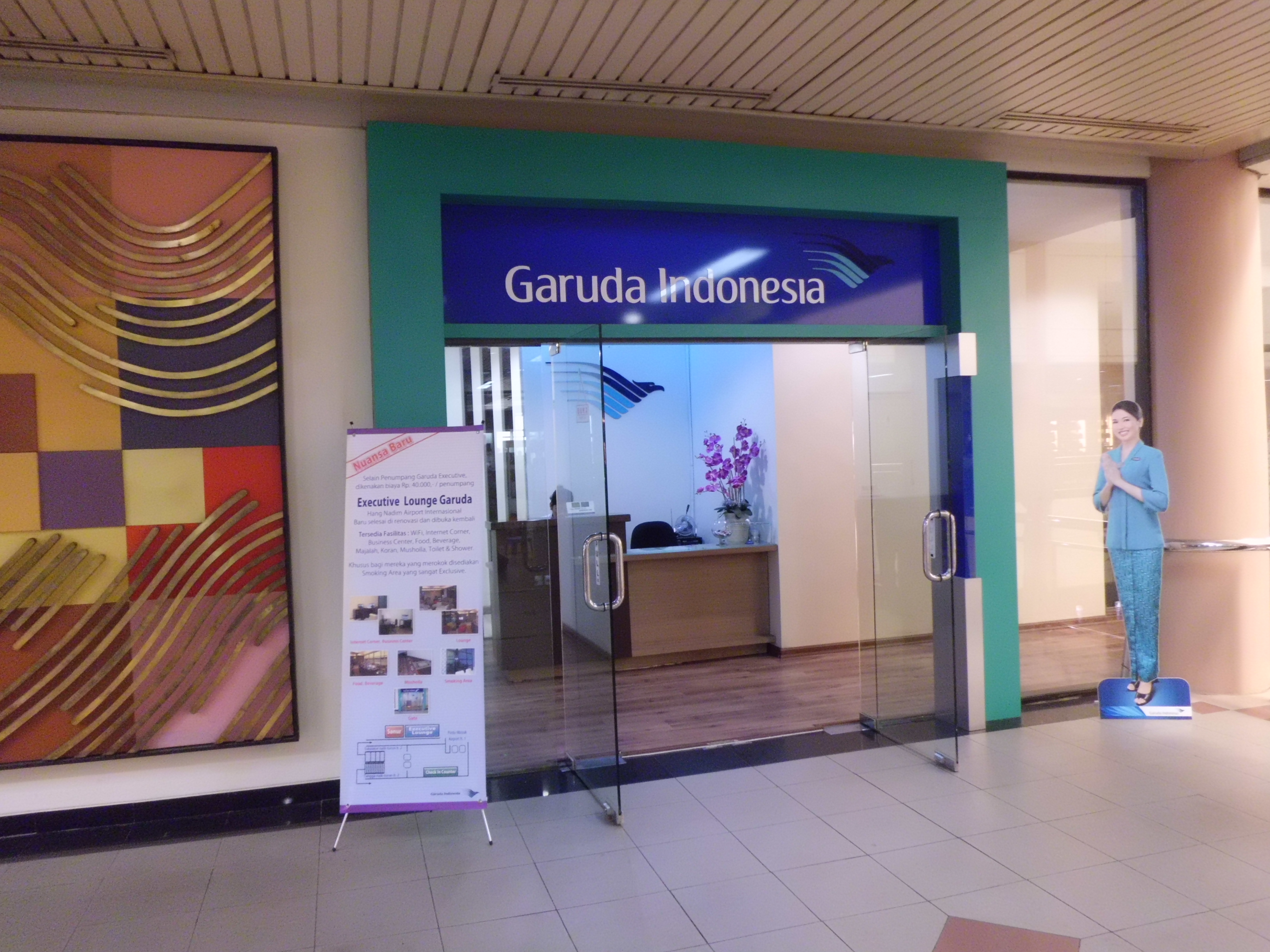
Garuda Indonesia Business Lounge at Hang Nadim Airport

==== Business Class lounge ====
The Garuda Business Lounge is open to passengers travelling in Business Class, as well as those holding a Platinum GarudaMiles card. Lounges are located at Soekarno–Hatta International Airport and throughout Indonesia, offering food and drinks, wireless internet, showers, meeting rooms and business services.

==== First Class lounge ====
Garuda Indonesia has also provided a first-class lounge at Soekarno–Hatta International Airport.

== Sponsorships ==
Garuda Indonesia was the official sponsor of the 2011 Southeast Asian Games. Garuda Indonesia also supports the "Wonderful Indonesia" tourism campaign by placing the "Wonderful Indonesia" logo in their promotional materials as well as on the hulls of their aircraft.

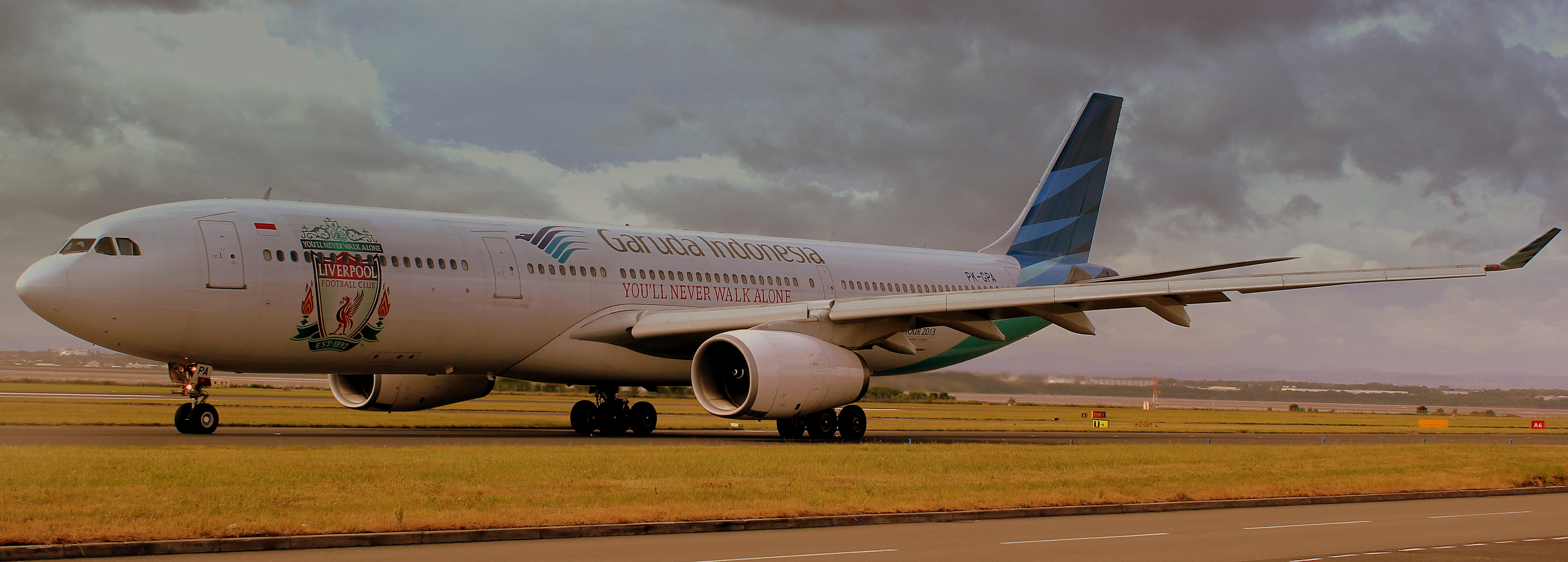
Garuda Indonesia Airbus A330-300 in Liverpool FC onboard marking at Liverpool John Lennon Airport

In July 2012, Garuda Indonesia signed a three-year sponsorship deal with Premier League club Liverpool FC. The agreement made Garuda Indonesia the Official Partner of Liverpool Football Club and the Official Global Airline Partner of Liverpool Football Club. In addition, a six-minute advertisement video of Garuda Indonesia was to be broadcast during matches held at the Liverpool FC home ground, Anfield, for the 2012–2014 season.

== Market share ==
Aviation market share in Indonesia (2021)
1. Lion Air (29.7%)
2. Citilink (22.6%)
3. Batik Air (21.8%)
4. Garuda Indonesia (10.5%)
5. Wings Air (7.90%)
6. Sriwijaya Air (3.30%)
7. Indonesia AirAsia (1.90%)
8. Other (2.30%)

In 2021, Garuda Indonesia carried 10.5% of Indonesia’s domestic passengers, behind Lion Air (29.7%), Citilink (22.6%) and Batik Air (21.8%). Wings Air accounted for 7.9%, Sriwijaya Air for 3.3% and Indonesia AirAsia for 1.9%.

In 2021, Lion Air group accounted for 59.4% of the market share, while Garuda Indonesia group had a 33.1% market share.

== Incidents and accidents ==
On 26 September 1997, Garuda Indonesia Flight 152, an Airbus A300, crashed during its approach to Medan, killing all 234 people on board.

On 7 March 2007, Garuda Indonesia Flight 200, a Boeing 737-400, overran the runway at Yogyakarta and caught fire, killing 21 people.

== Gallery ==
=== Hybrid liveries ===
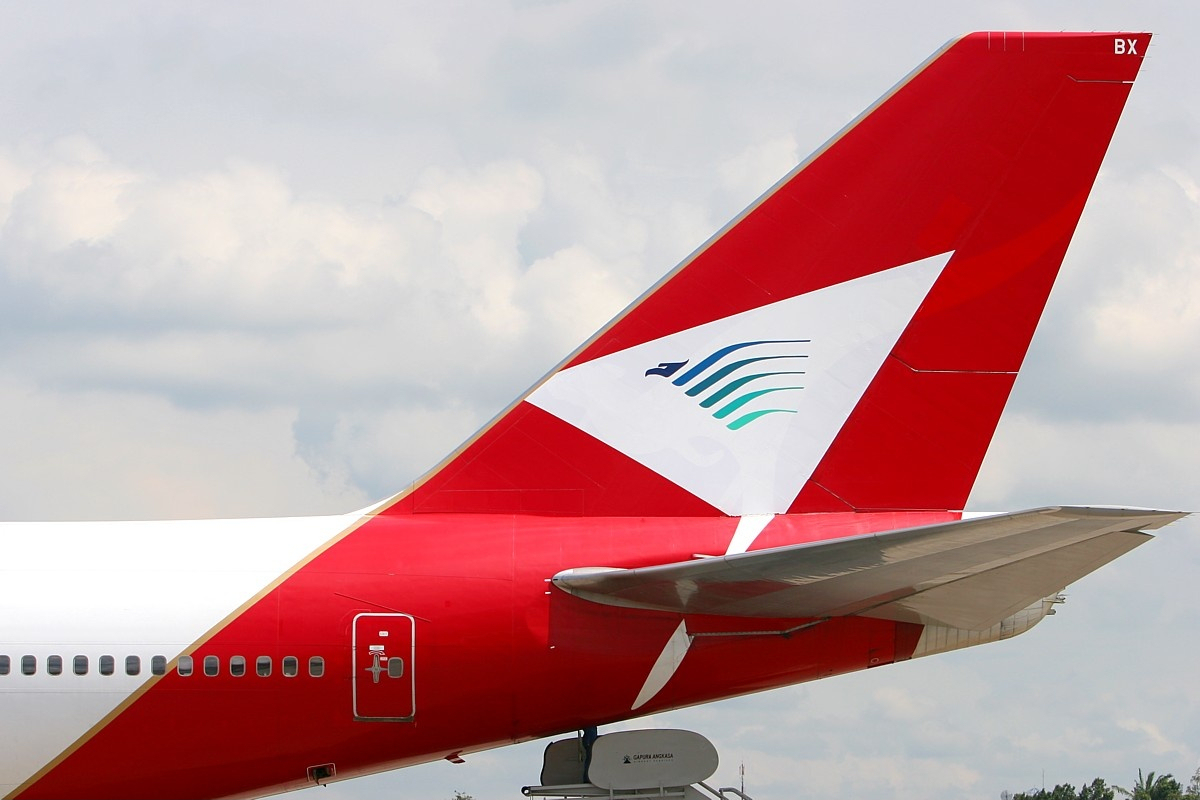
Tail of a Qantas Boeing 747-300 for the Hajj flights season.

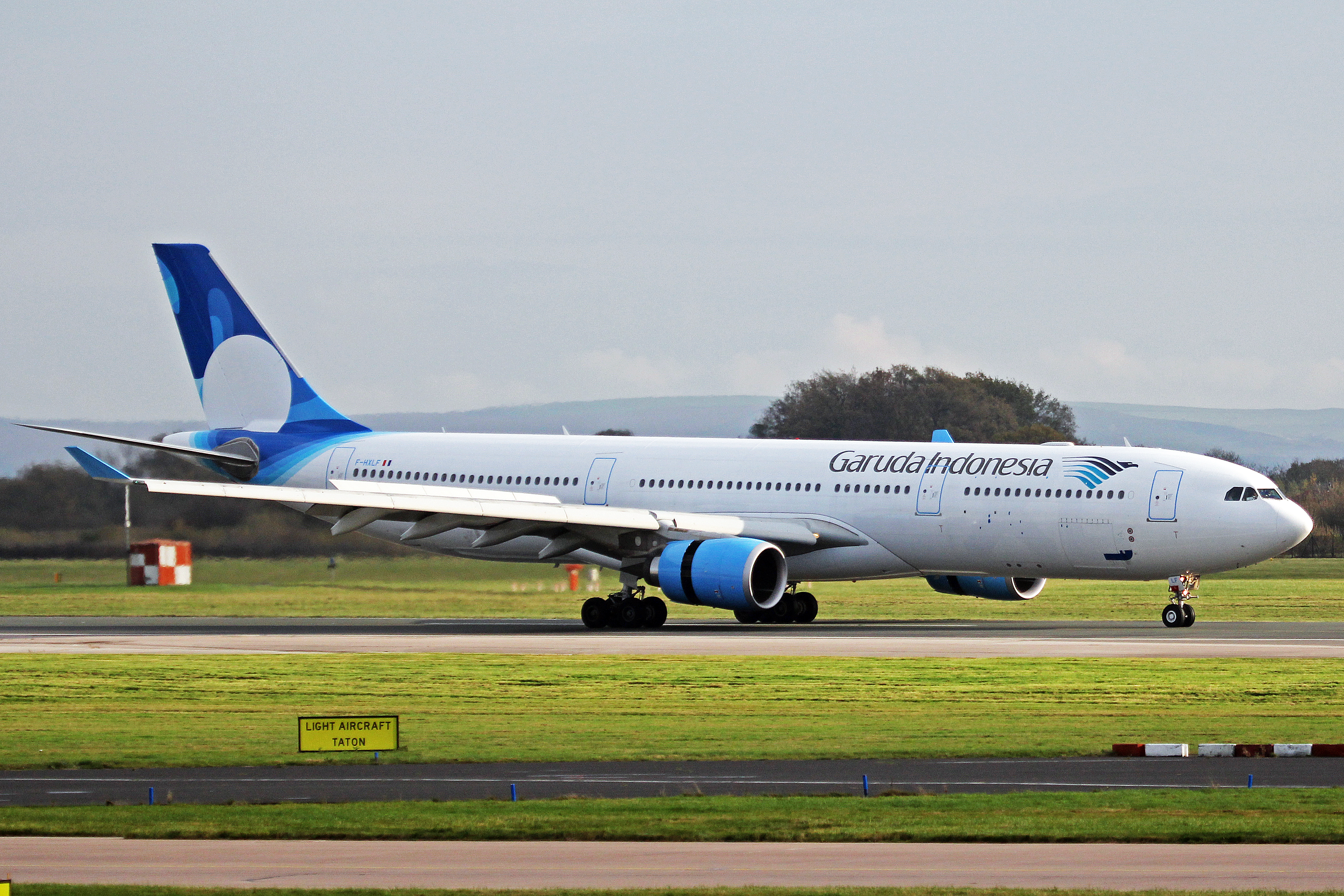
An XL Airways livery with Garuda Indonesia titles having just returned from a Hajj services.

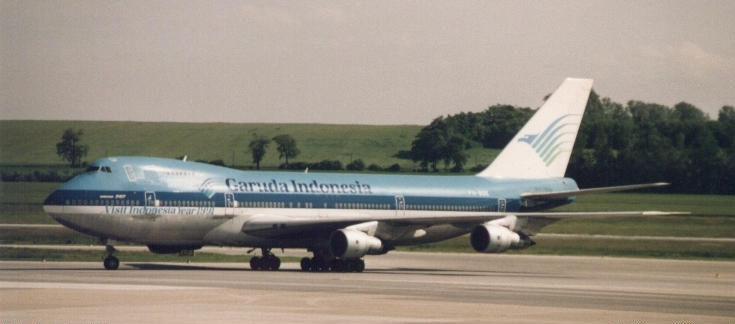
Boeing 747-206B on lease from KLM - Royal Dutch Airlines at the Vienna Schwechat International Airport.

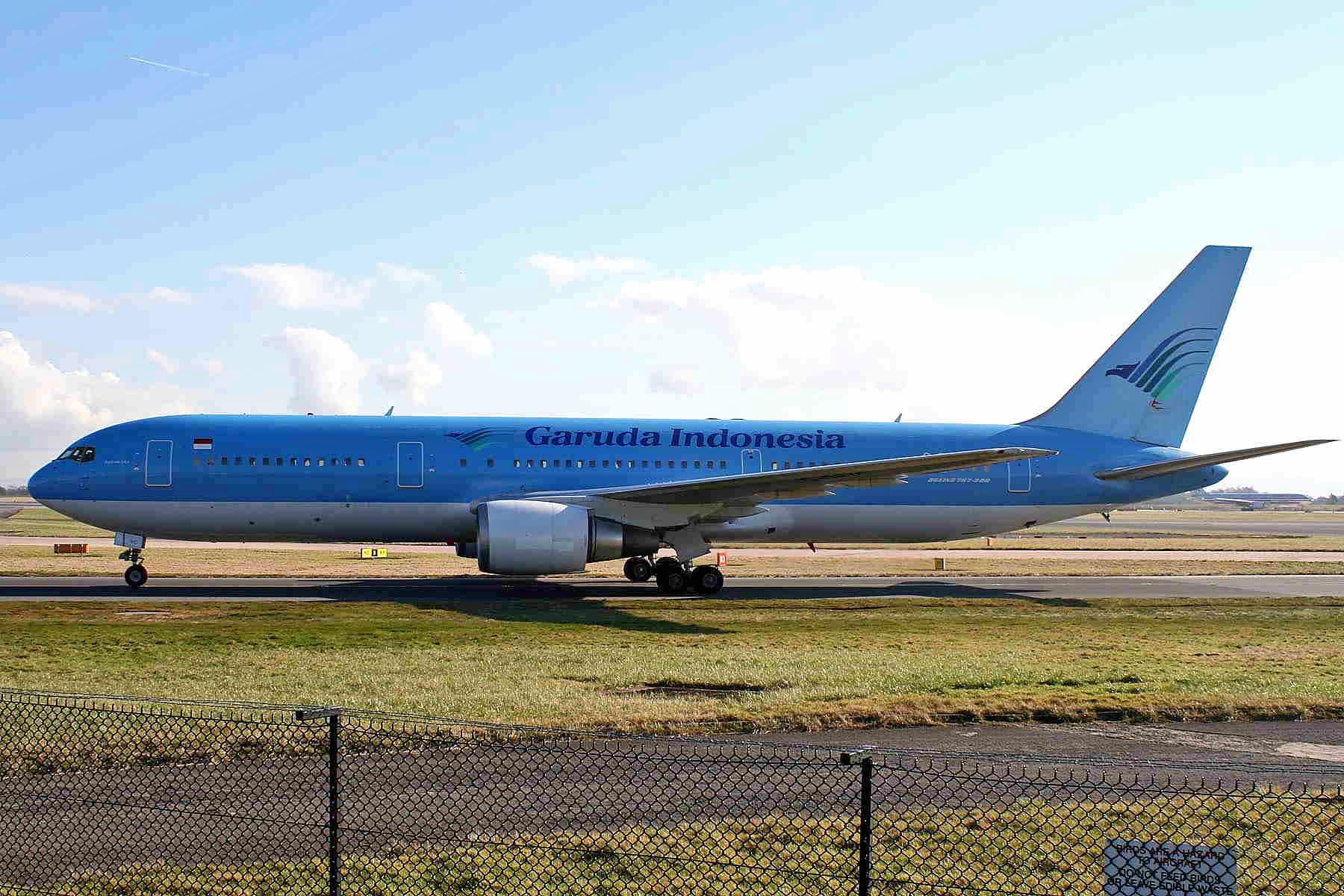
Boeing 767-300 on return to Thomsonfly.com after Hajj Pilgrimage lease to Garuda Indonesia.

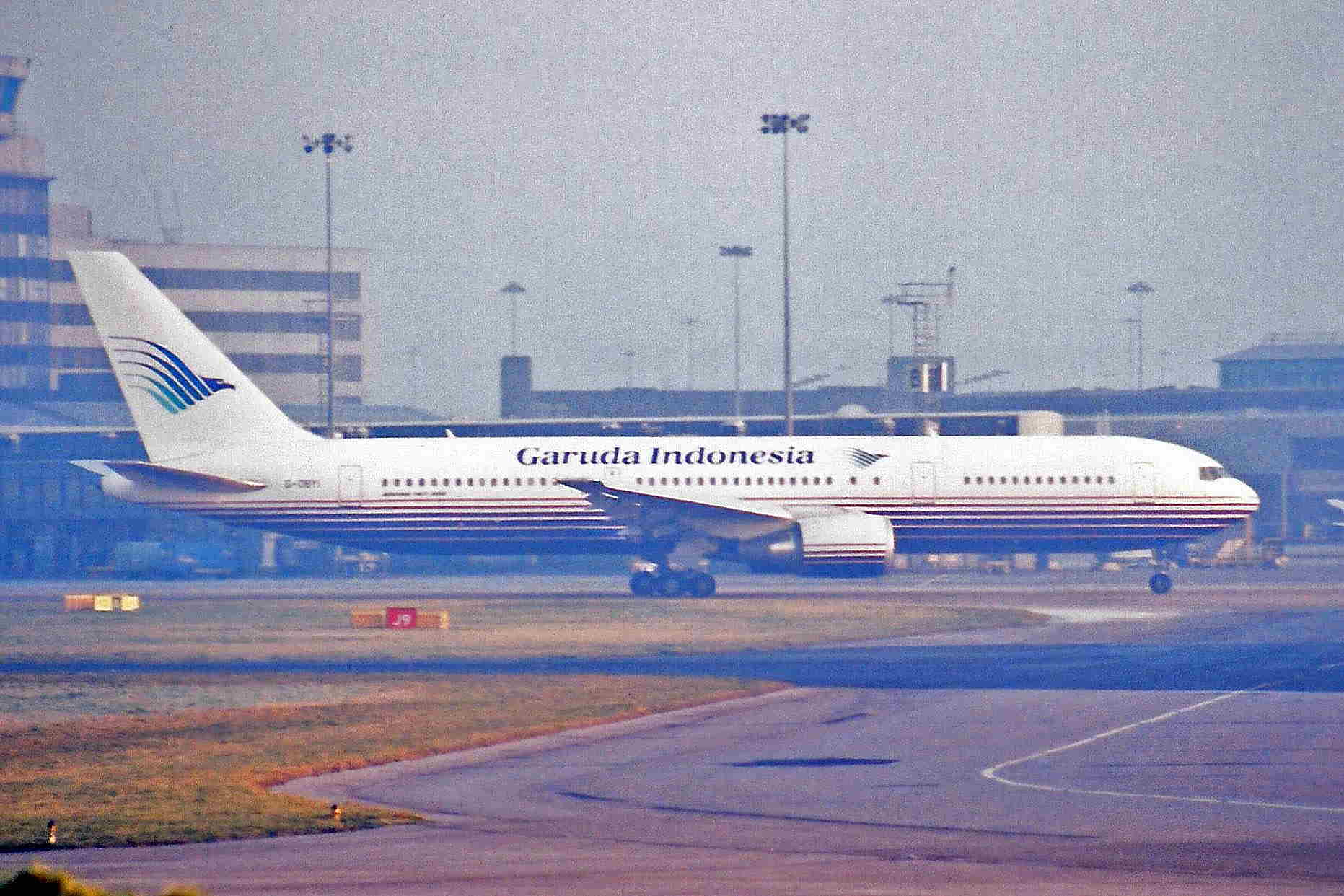
Boeing 767-300 departing Manchester on 2 months Hajj Pilgrimage leased from Britannia Airways.

== See also ==
- Aviation in Indonesia
- List of airlines of Indonesia
- List of airports in Indonesia
- List of companies of Indonesia
- Tourism in Indonesia
- Transport in Indonesia
