= KLM Interinsulair Bedrijf =

Dutch East Indies airline of KLM

- Founded: 1 August 1947
- Ceased operations: 28 December 1949 (2 years, 4 months and 27 days)
- Fleet size: 10+
- Destinations: Domestic and International
- Parent company: KLM
- Headquarters: Java, Dutch East Indies

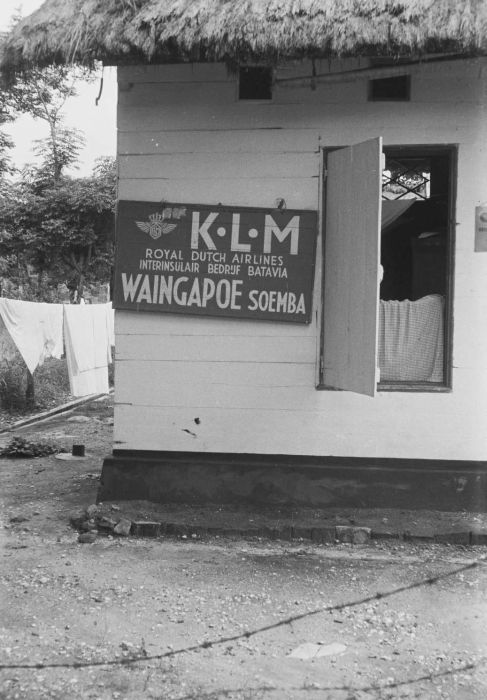
KLM Interinsulair Office in Waingapu, (1949)

Koninklijke Luchtvaart Maatschappij Interinsulair Bedrijf Batavia (KLM Interinsulair Bedrijf or simply KLM-IIB; lit. 'Royal Dutch Interinsular Airline Services Batavia') was an airline based in the Dutch East Indies (present-day Indonesia) and the predecessor to Garuda Indonesia.

== History ==
KLM Interinsulair Bedrijf (KLM-IIB) was founded on 1 August 1947 at Kemayoran Airport as a KLM subsidiary (due to the dissolution of Koninklijke Nederlandsch-Indische Luchtvaart Maatschappij (KNILM)), and all of the aircraft in KNILM fleet were later transferred to KLM-IIB. They also received twenty Dakota aircraft, previously operated by Koninklijk Nederlands Indisch Leger (KNIL).

Based in Java, their destinations consisted of domestic routes (within Indonesia) and also international routes (such as Singapore; Penang, British Malaya; and Manila, Philippines), operated by several Dakotas and nine Consolidated PBY Catalina amphibious aircraft.

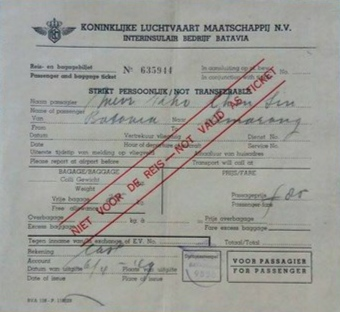
Boarding pass of KLM-IIB

== Nationalization by Indonesian government ==
On 28 December 1949, KLM-IIB was nationalized by the Indonesian government, as agreed by both the Indonesian and Dutch governments during the 1949 Dutch-Indonesian Round Table Conference. Upon the nationalization, the airline was renamed as Garuda Indonesia, now the flag carrier of Indonesia, and it remains to this day.

== Fleet ==
- DC-3 Dakota, 20
- Consolidated PBY Catalina, 9

== Accidents and incidents ==
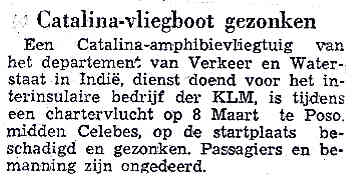
News of PK-CTC, written in Dutch

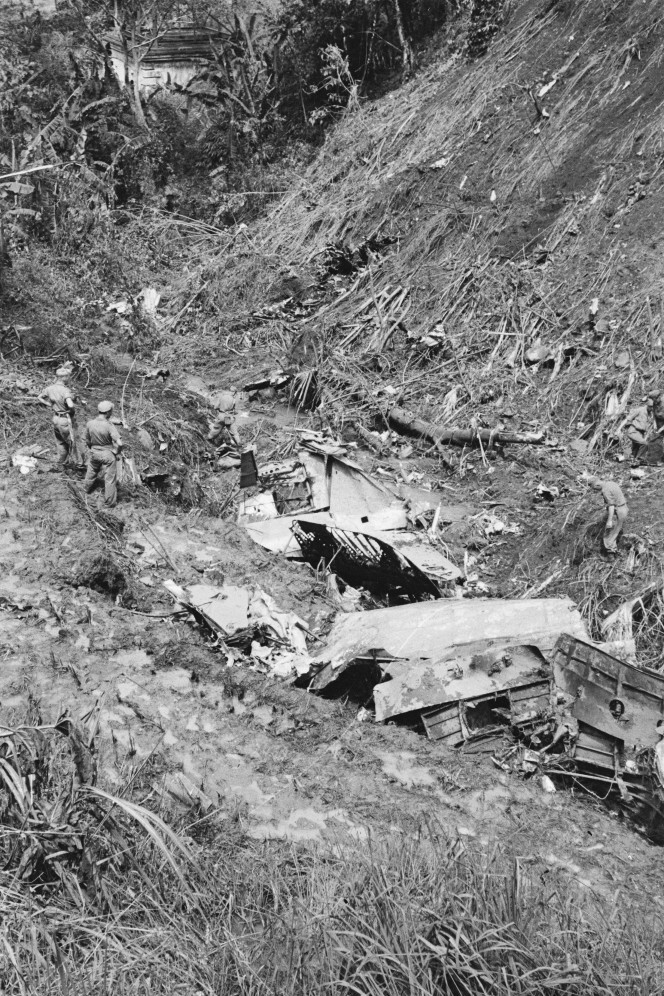
Photograph of PK-REA, as provided by the Nationaal Archief

- On 10 February 1948, Flight 947, a Douglas C-47B (PK-REA), lost control and crashed near Padalarang while attempting to return to Bandung following an engine failure, killing all 19 on board.
- On 8 March 1948, a Consolidated PBY Catalina (PK-CTC) was damaged during takeoff at Poso, Sulawesi and sank, due to "a misunderstanding about the starting procedure to be followed between captain [C.L. van Kooij] and 2nd pilot [M.G. Nicolai] crashed during takeoff." None of the nine crew and passengers were injured. It was damaged beyond repair. It "took all the luggage to the seabed."
