= Aerowisata =

Indonesian hospitality company

- Type: Subsidiary
- Industry: Tourism
- Founded: 1973 (Jakarta)
- Headquarters: Jakarta, Indonesia
- Area served: Asia Pacific
- Key people: Alexander Maria Tae Maneklaran (CEO); Doddy Virgianto (Director of Finance and Business Development)
- Products: International flight catering services, hotel & resort, travel & leisure, land transportation and cargo
- Operating income: Rp 1,089 billion
- Parent: Garuda Indonesia Group
- Subsidiaries: Garuda Orient Holidays - Australia Pty, Ltd; Garuda Orient Holidays - Australia Pty, Ltd; PT Belitung Inti Permai; PT Mirtasari Hotel Development; PT Senggigi Pratama Internasional; PT Angkasa Citra Sarana Catering Service; PT Mandira Erajasa Wahana; PT Biro Perjalanan Wisata Satriavi; PT Aerojasa Perkasa; PT Bina Inti Dinamika; Garuda Orient Holidays - Korea Co, Ltd; Garuda Orient Holidays - Jepang Co, Ltd
- Website: www.aerowisata.com

Aerowisata is an Indonesian hospitality company based in Jakarta. It has five main businesses, consisting of Foodservice, Hotels, Travel, Transportation and Logistics. It is a subsidiary of the Garuda Indonesia Group.

== History ==
On 7 February 1974, Garuda Indonesian Airways handed the management of PT Satriavi Tours and travel to Aerowisata. The next company that later changed its name to PT Biro Perjalanan Satriavi became first subsidiary Aerowisata.

On 29 July 1974, Aerowisata began operating the Hotel Sanur Beach in Bali as the first hotel of Aerowisata.

On 23 December 1974, Aerowisata started a catering business for Garuda Indonesian Airways to serve under the flag of PT Garuda Dairy Farm Aero Catering Service. Since 1991, the company located at the terminal end of the Soekarno-Hatta International Airport was renamed Aerowisata Catering Service (ACS).

After forming Garuda Orient Holidays (GOH) in Australia in 1981 and PT Aero Service Perkasa in 1987, founded the PT Mandira Erajasa Aerowisata spacecraft in July 1988. Marked the establishment of business expansion into the realm of transportation Aerowisata. In 1991, holdings included the Sengiggi Beach hotel which includes the Nusa Dua and the Nusa Indah, as well as Sanur Beach.

== Properties ==
As of December 2009, Aerowisata has eleven subsidiaries and eight affiliated companies. Aerowisata currently owns 4 hotels located in 4 different provinces in Indonesia with 3 different hotel star level. Those are:

- Five stars: Prama from Sanskrit language means Excellence
- Four stars: Kila from Javanese language means Sparkle
- Three stars: Asana, an acronym of the Indonesian words Akrab, Santun and Mempesona means Friendly, Polite and Charming
