= Selaparang =

Selaparang may refer to:

- Selaparang, a district of the city of Mataram, on the Indonesian island of Lombok, the capital of West Nusa Tenggara province
- Selaparang Airport, the sole airport serving the island of Lombok and the city of Mataram. Now replaced by the Lombok International Airport
