= Lombok Institute of Flight Technology =

Indonesian higher learning institution

- Seal of LIFT
- Latin: Lombok Instituti Fugae Lorem
- Motto: Volare altius, fugere velocius, fugere novum
- Motto in English: "Fly higher, fly faster, fly newer"
- President: Lalu Didiek, S.E
- Faculty: 6
- Staff: 12
- Location: Mataram, Lombok, Indonesia
- Coordinates: 8°33′38″S 116°05′39″E
- Interactive map of Lombok Institute of Flight Technology
- Website: www.liftacademy.or.id

Lombok Institute of Flight Technology, also known as LIFT, is an Indonesian higher learning institution specializing in theoretical and practical aeronautical science education.

Based on Lombok Island (approximately 60 miles east of Bali Island), the institute received its educational accreditation as a flight academy from the Directorate General of Civil Aviation of Indonesia in 2010.

The institute operates from Lombok International Airport, Bima Airport and Sultan Muhammad Kaharuddin III Airport.

== History ==
The Lombok Institute of Flight Technology was established in 2011. It received a pilot school certificate license number 141D-012 from the Ministry of Transportation, Director General of Civil Aviation.

The Lombok Institute of Flight Technology has enrolled more than 200 professional pilots internationally.

In 2018, LIFT earned its accreditation from the International Education Accreditation Council (IEDACC).

In 2020 the Lombok Institute of Flight Technology was acquired by Mr. Lalu Didiek Yuliadi, SE.

== Facilities ==
LIFT's flight training campus is located in the Senggigi resort area, on the island of Lombok, West Nusa Tenggara, Indonesia. LIFT maintains a satellite campus (academics only) in Serpong, Tangerang, in West Jakarta.

LIFT maintains a fleet of six Liberty XL2 flight training aircraft from Liberty Aerospace Corporation. These aircraft were produced in Melbourne, Florida, in 2010.

LIFT operats a flight simulation department that houses two full-motion flight simulators capable of semi-realistic reproduction of flight in Liberty XL2 aircraft.

== Academics ==
The institute offers professional pilots courses in the following areas of aeronautical theory:

- Basic Aerodynamics
- Advanced Aerodynamics
- General Navigation
- Radio Navigation
- Meteorology
- Aircraft Systems
- Instrumentation & Electronics
- Radio Theory
- Operational Procedures
- Aircraft Weight & Balance
