= Ngurah Rai International Airport =

I Gusti Ngurah Rai International Airport Bandar Udara Internasional I Gusti Ngurah Rai

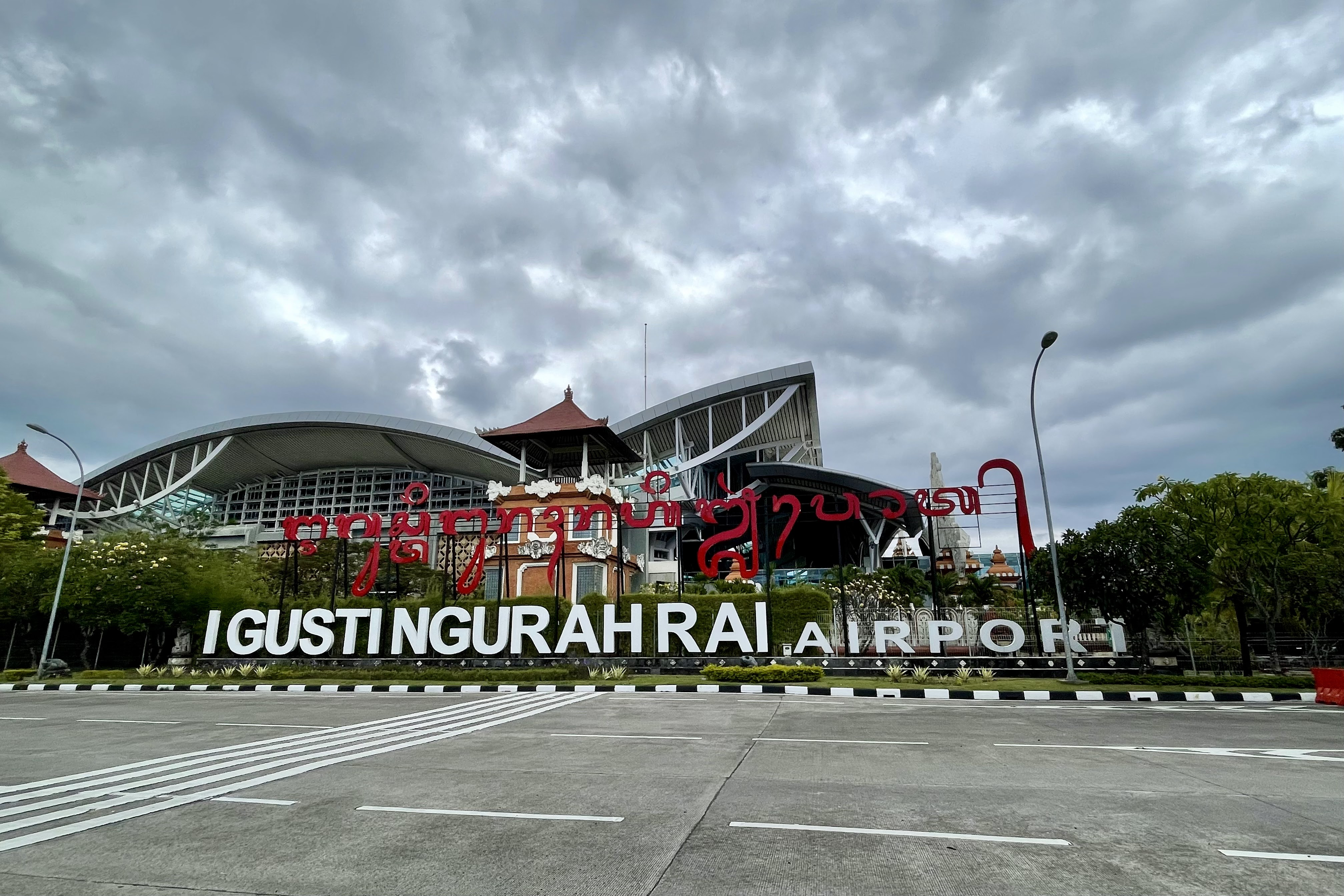
- IATA: DPS; ICAO: WADD; WMO: 97230

Summary
- Airport type: Public / Military
- Owner: Government of Indonesia
- Operator: InJourney Airports
- Serves: Bali
- Location: Tuban, Kuta District, Badung Regency, Bali, Indonesia
- Opened: 1931; 95 years ago
- Hub for: Batik Air; Garuda Indonesia
- Operating base for: Citilink; Indonesia AirAsia; Jetstar; Lion Air; Super Air Jet; TransNusa; Wings Air
- Time zone: WITA (UTC+08:00)
- Elevation AMSL: 4 m (13 ft)
- Coordinates: 08°44′53″S 115°10′03″E
- Website: www.bali-airport.com

Map
- Location in Badung Regency Location in Bali Location in Indonesia DPS/WADD (Southeast Asia) DPS/WADD (Asia)

Runways
Direction	Length		Surface
Direction	m	ft	Surface
09/27	3,000	9,843	Asphalt

Statistics (2024)
- Passengers: 23,931,016 (▲11.55%)
- Cargo (tonnes): 69,704.55 (▲32.31%)
- Aircraft movements: 142,172 (▲4.29%)
- Source: DGCA

I Gusti Ngurah Rai International Airport (IATA: DPS, ICAO: WADD), commonly known simply as Ngurah Rai International Airport, and also known as Denpasar International Airport or Bali Airport, is the main international airport serving the island of Bali, Indonesia. It is the island's only airport handling scheduled commercial flights. The airport is named after I Gusti Ngurah Rai, a Balinese national hero who was killed on 20 November 1946 during the Battle of Margarana (Puputan Margarana) in Tabanan. He and his troops were defeated by Dutch forces with air support during the Indonesian National Revolution, resulting in his death along with 95 of his men.

Located in Tuban, Badung Regency, approximately 13 kilometres (8.1 mi) south of Denpasar, the airport serves the Denpasar metropolitan area as well as the entire island of Bali. It offers domestic connections to major Indonesian cities and international routes to destinations across Australia, New Zealand, Southeast Asia, East Asia, Europe, and the Middle East. I Gusti Ngurah Rai International Airport is the second-busiest airport in Indonesia after Soekarno–Hatta International Airport in Jakarta and serves as a hub for airlines such as Garuda Indonesia and Batik Air. The airport is classified as Category IX, enabling it to accommodate wide-body aircraft, including the Boeing 747-8 and Airbus A380.

In addition to serving as a commercial airport, the facility is shared with I Gusti Ngurah Rai Air Force Base, a Type B airbase of the Indonesian Air Force. The base supports military aviation operations, light to medium maintenance of defense equipment, and contributes to the air defense of the Bali region.

== History ==
=== Colonial era ===
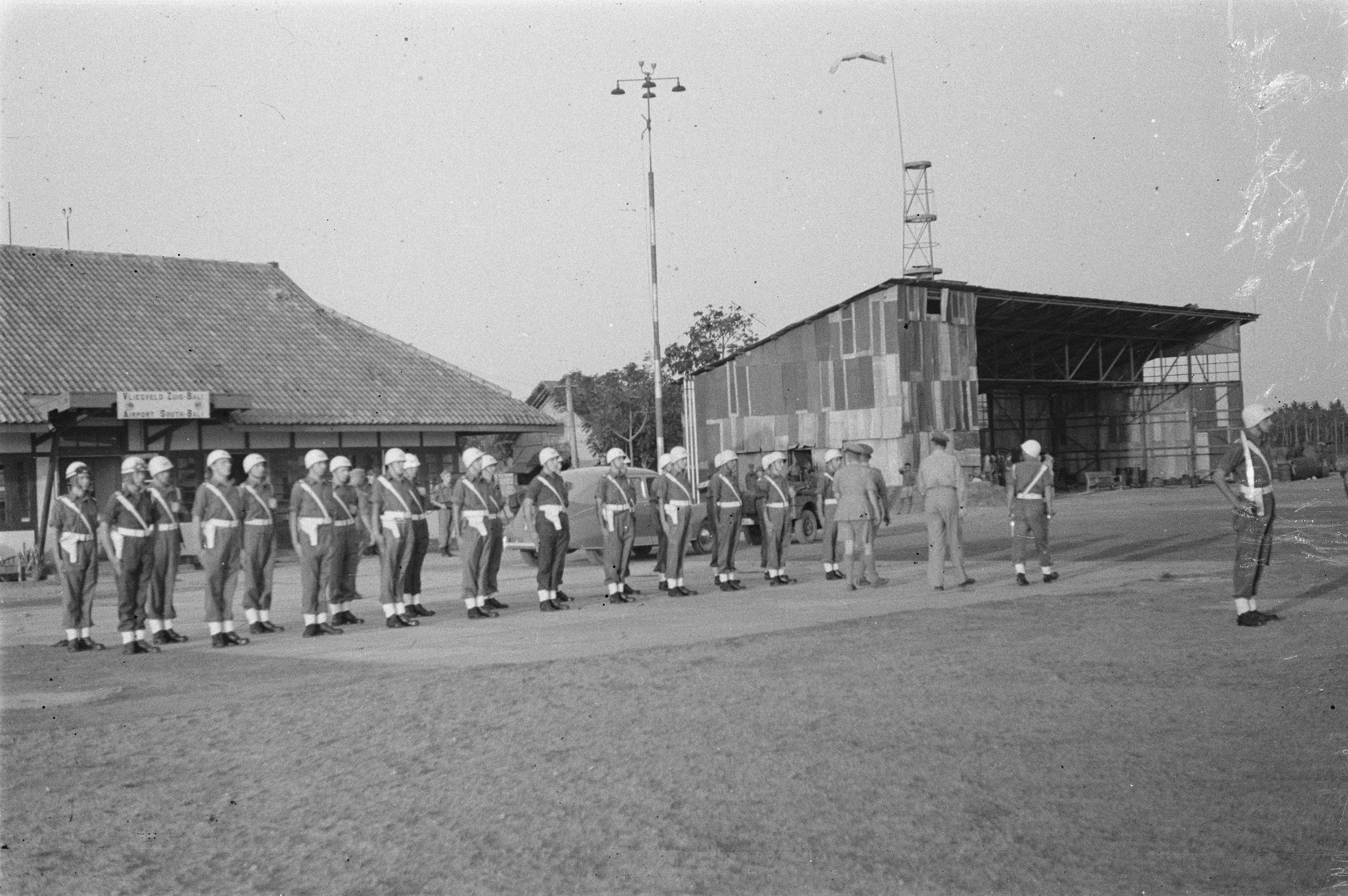
Military police of the Royal Netherlands East Indies Army (KNIL) at Tuban Airfield, 1946

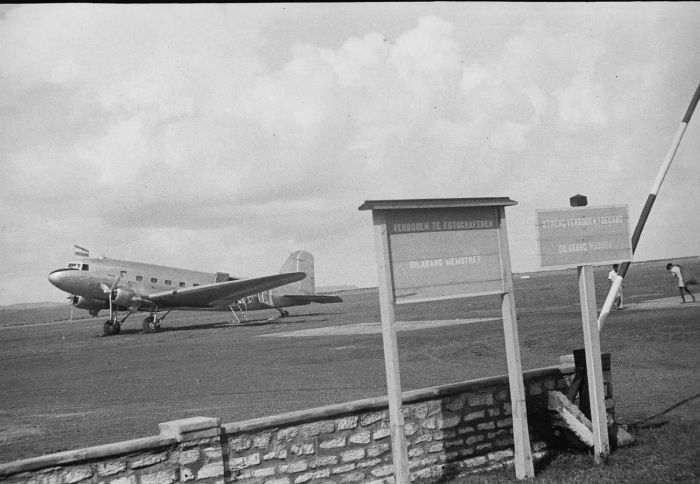
A Douglas DC-3 at Tuban Airfield, 1949

In the early 1930s, the Dutch colonial government constructed an airfield at Tuban, situated at the narrowest point along Bali's southern coast. Initially known as Tuban Airfield, it consisted of a simple 700-metre grass strip built by the Dutch East Indies' Voor Verkeer en Waterstaat (Department of Transport, Public Works and Water Management). At the time, the facility was rudimentary, with only a few huts and a short runway. Alongside the 700-metre grass runway, the airstrip was situated near a cemetery in the village of Tuban. Due to its location within the village, the surrounding community commonly referred to it as Tuban Airfield. In early 1935, an Imperial Airways de Havilland Express attempted to land at Tuban Airfield on the 700-meter runway, in which at that time 250 meters had been paved. The airline intended to use this airstrip as an overnight stop before continuing to Makassar. At the time, its aircraft routinely landed and stayed overnight at Rambang in Lombok before proceeding to Makassar the following day. Imperial Airways requested that the airstrip be repaired, reinforced, and, if possible, equipped with communication facilities linked to Surabaya. When no immediate response was received, the airline followed up by asking whether the Dutch East Indies authorities, including the Dutch East Indies’ national carrier, Koninklijke Nederlandsch-Indische Luchtvaart Maatschappij (KNILM), expected Imperial Airways to finance the necessary improvements. At the time, the Dutch colonial administration and KNILM had initially opposed the development of the airfield, likely due to the considerable costs involved. By that time, the airfield was already serving commercial operations, including regular flights operated by KNILM, which connected Bali with Surabaya. In January 1938, the airfield was finally rebuilt and upgraded to accommodate larger American aircraft such as the Douglas DC-3; previously, it had been limited to handling aircraft no larger than the Fokker F.VII.

In 1942, following the outbreak of the Pacific War during World War II, the airfield was used to stage fighter and bomber operations. The Japanese sought to capture the airfield as a support base for their planned assault on Java. At the time, the facility had been abandoned, with no aircraft of the Royal Netherlands East Indies Army Air Force (ML-KNIL) present. On 16 February 1942, Japanese forces launched an air raid on the airfield, rendering it inoperable. In its aftermath, the poorly motivated garrison of around 600 Dutch-led Balinese militia quickly deserted as Japanese troops advanced on the island, while their Dutch officers fled to Java. The Dutch attempted to destroy the airfield to prevent it from falling into Japanese hands. However, the commander later discovered that, due to a misunderstanding of orders, the demolition had not been carried out as intended. His instruction not to delay the destruction was misinterpreted by the engineers, who instead believed the operation should be postponed. As a result, Japanese forces were able to capture the airfield intact on 19 February. By the following day, Mitsubishi A6M Zero fighters of the Imperial Japanese Naval Air Service had landed at the captured airfield, preparing for air raids against Allied positions on Java. The capture of the airfield effectively cut off reinforcement routes from Australia, as Japanese forces gained air superiority and were able to intercept incoming aircraft over the sea before they could land, further sealing the fate of the Dutch East Indies.

During the Japanese occupation from 1942 to 1945, the airport's runway was improved and repaired, including the use of pierced steel plates to restore damaged sections. Between 1942 and 1947, the runway was extended from 700 to 1,200 meters, and the Japanese constructed extensive additional facilities at the airfield to support their military operations. The airfield was used by the Imperial Japanese Naval Air Service throughout the war and served as a base for the Tainan Air Group during the campaign in Java; however, no significant Japanese fighter squadron was stationed in Denpasar thereafter. Nevertheless, the capture of Tuban Airfield and the island of Bali deprived the Allied forces of a key fighter staging point along the route from Australia to Java. Throughout the war, Allied forces repeatedly targeted the airfield with air raids in an effort to render it inoperable.

After the Japanese surrender in 1945, the airfield briefly came under the control of local Indonesian militias before being handed over to the Netherlands Indies Civil Administration (NICA) in 1946. In 1949, a terminal building and other basic aviation facilities were constructed, along with a simple wooden air traffic control tower. Air-to-ground communications at the time were conducted using Morse code transceivers.

=== Post-independence era ===
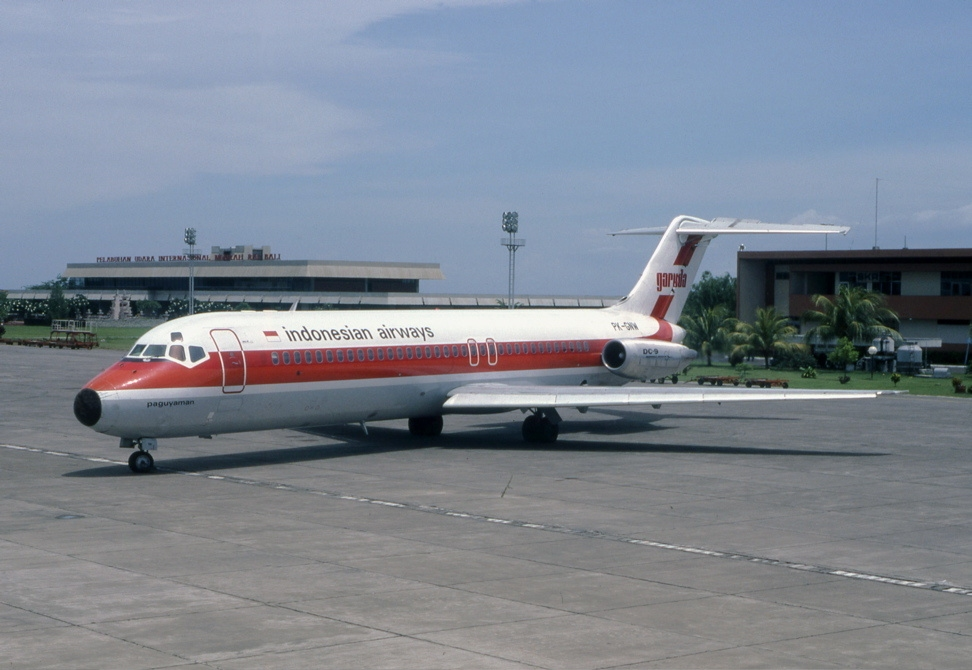
A Garuda Indonesia McDonnell Douglas DC-9 at Ngurah Rai International Airport, 1980

Following the Dutch recognition of Indonesian sovereignty, control of the airfield was transferred to Indonesian authorities in 1950. President Soekarno was recorded landing at Tuban Airfield in 1955 aboard a Douglas DC-3. From 1959, the airfield began receiving international flights, including services operated by Thai Airways International, a company founded in 1960 as a joint venture between Scandinavian Airlines System and Thailand's domestic carrier Thai Airways Company, and Qantas, and was already capable of accommodating Convair 240 aircraft. Possibly due to his frequent visits to Bali, or broader international considerations, President Soekarno accorded high priority to the development of Tuban Airfield. Subsequently, improvement and expansion works were initiated. The project formally began in 1963 with the construction of a new 2,700-metre runway, while the original runway was converted into a parallel taxiway. The project ran from 1963 to 1969, was known as the Tuban Airport Projects. Land reclamation extended the runway and its two overruns by 1,500 meters, using material quarried from limestone at Ungasan and sand sourced from the Antosari–Tabanan river. With the completion of a temporary terminal and the upgraded runway, the government inaugurated international air services at Tuban Airport on 10 August 1966.

To accommodate the steadily increasing number of passengers, the terminal buildings were expanded, with construction of an international terminal undertaken between 1965 and 1969. This development added international facilities to the existing domestic passenger terminal. The upgraded airport was inaugurated on 1 August 1968 by then-President Soeharto alongside the renaming of the airfield to its current name. The name honors I Gusti Ngurah Rai, a prominent Indonesian nationalist leader during the country's struggle for independence. The earlier runway extension had also disrupted natural sand movement along the coastline. By 1975, projected passenger growth had already exceeded the capacity of the existing facilities, prompting the construction of a new international passenger terminal, which was completed in 1978. The former international terminal was subsequently converted into the domestic terminal, while the old domestic terminal was repurposed for cargo and catering operations.

On 1 October 1980, management of Ngurah Rai International Airport was transferred from the Directorate General of Civil Aviation to Perum Angkasa Pura, the predecessor of Angkasa Pura I, later rebranded as InJourney Airports. In the 1990s, further development of Ngurah Rai International Airport was carried out under the Airport Facilities and Aviation Safety Development (FBUKP) programs. Phase I of the project (1990–1992) included the expansion of the terminal building with the addition of aviobridges, extension of the runway to 3,000 meters, relocation of taxiways, enlargement of the apron, renovation and expansion of the passenger terminal, expansion of the vehicle parking area, and development of cargo and operations buildings, as well as improvements to air navigation systems and aircraft fuel supply facilities. Phase II of the FBUKP project (1998–2000) was implemented by the Directorate General of Civil Aviation and included further airport development works, notably the utilization of approximately 12 hectares of mangrove forest for aviation safety facilities.

=== 21st century ===
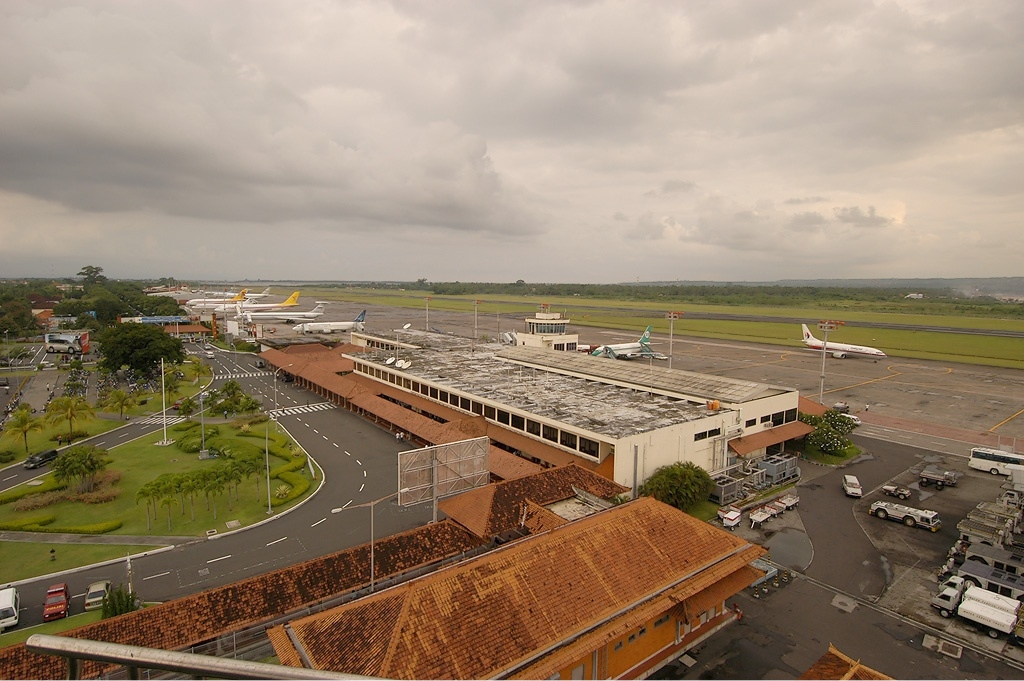
View of Ngurah Rai International Airport, 2004

In 2000, the airport recorded 43,797 domestic and international flights, carrying 4,443,856 passengers. In 2005, the Transportation Security Administration of the United States determined that the airport was not meeting the security standards of the International Civil Aviation Organization. However, this warning was lifted in 2007. By the end of April 2011, the airport's terminals handled 11.1 million passengers a year, exceeding its capacity of 8 million. Angkasa Pura I will relocate 35 guest houses to accommodate the expansion, which is expected to occupy up to 265.5 hectares of land for a new access road to the airport and a new airport building, the construction of a new flyover, enlarge airport terminal and improve luggage handling system.

Plans to expand the international and domestic terminals at Ngurah Rai International Airport were announced in September 2008, with an estimated cost of up to Rp 1 trillion (US$110.10 million) and an initial targeted completion date in 2011. The total terminal area was planned to increase from 83,000 square meters to around 200,000 square meters, comprising 130,000 square metros for the international terminal and 70,000 square meters for the domestic terminal. In December 2008, Angkasa Pura I confirmed that expansion works in Ngurah Rai International Airport would commence in early 2009. The Airport Facilities Development and Flight Safety (FBUKP) Phase III programs for Ngurah Rai International Airport included the development of terminal buildings, a multi-storey car park, and apron facilities. The plan involved constructing a new 120,000-square-metre international terminal on the site of the existing domestic terminal, while the existing international terminal would be converted into the new domestic terminal. Upon completion of these developments, Ngurah Rai International Airport was projected to accommodate up to 25 million passengers per year. The planned airport buildings were described as a blend contemporary and Balinese traditional architectural elements. The international terminal was opened in September 2013, followed by the domestic terminal in September 2014.

In 2016, Airports Council International awarded Ngurah Rai International Airport as the world's third best airport with 15-25 million passengers annually.

== Facilities and developments ==
=== Facilities ===
==== Domestic terminal ====
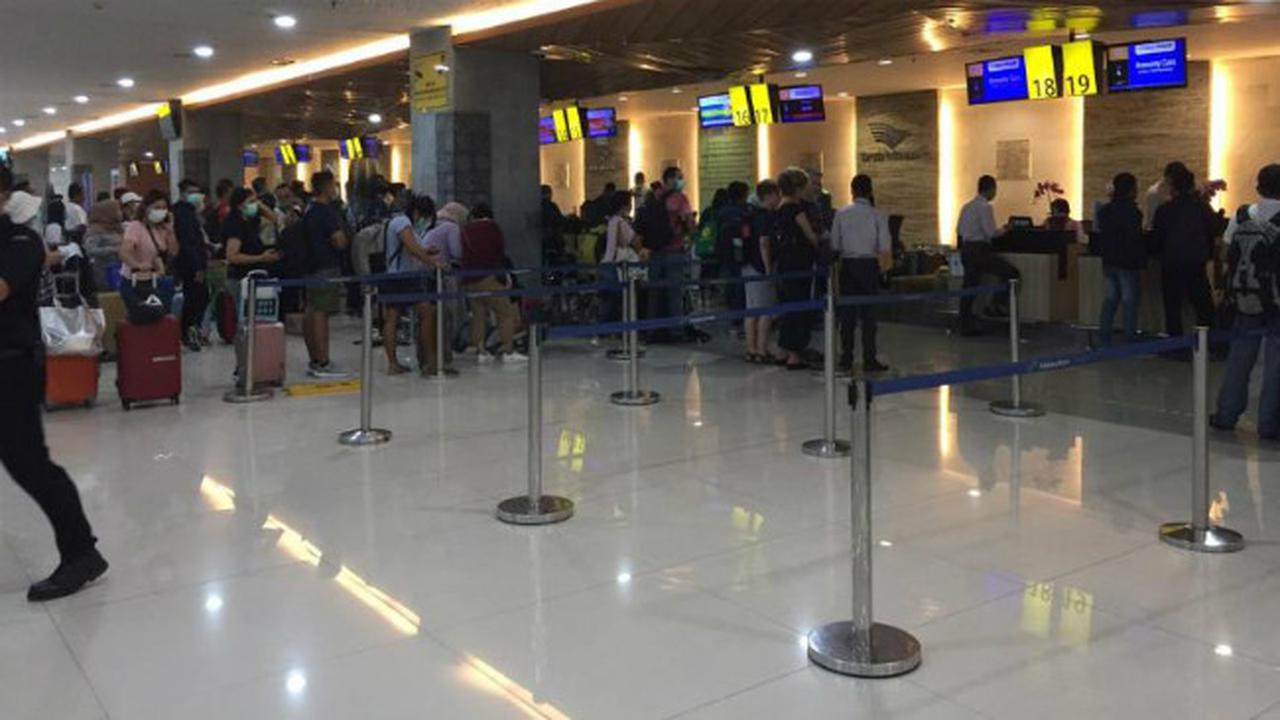
Domestic terminal check-in area

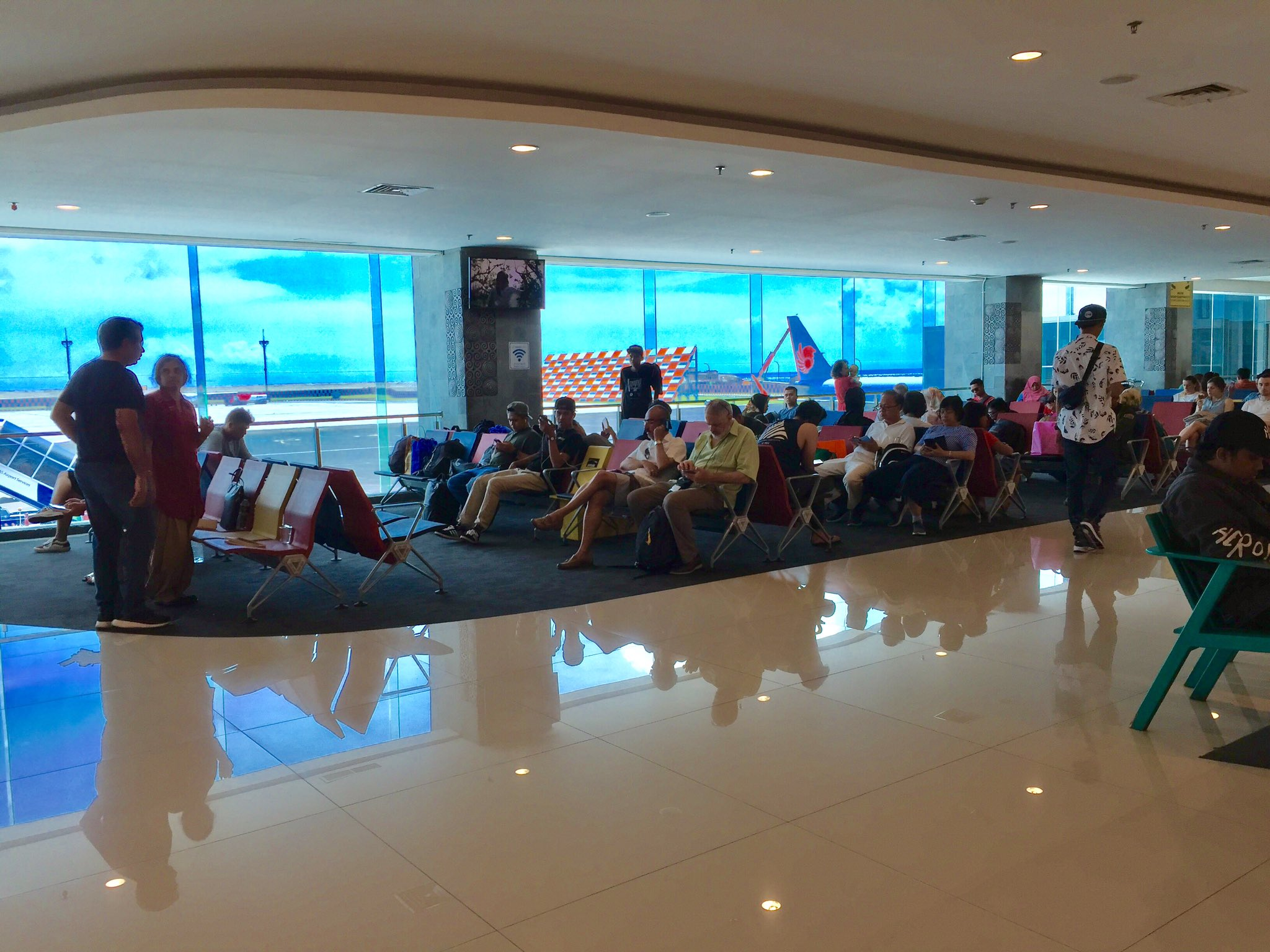
Domestic terminal boarding gate

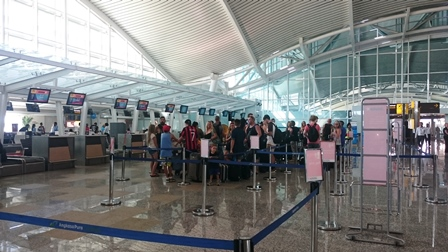
International terminal check-in hall

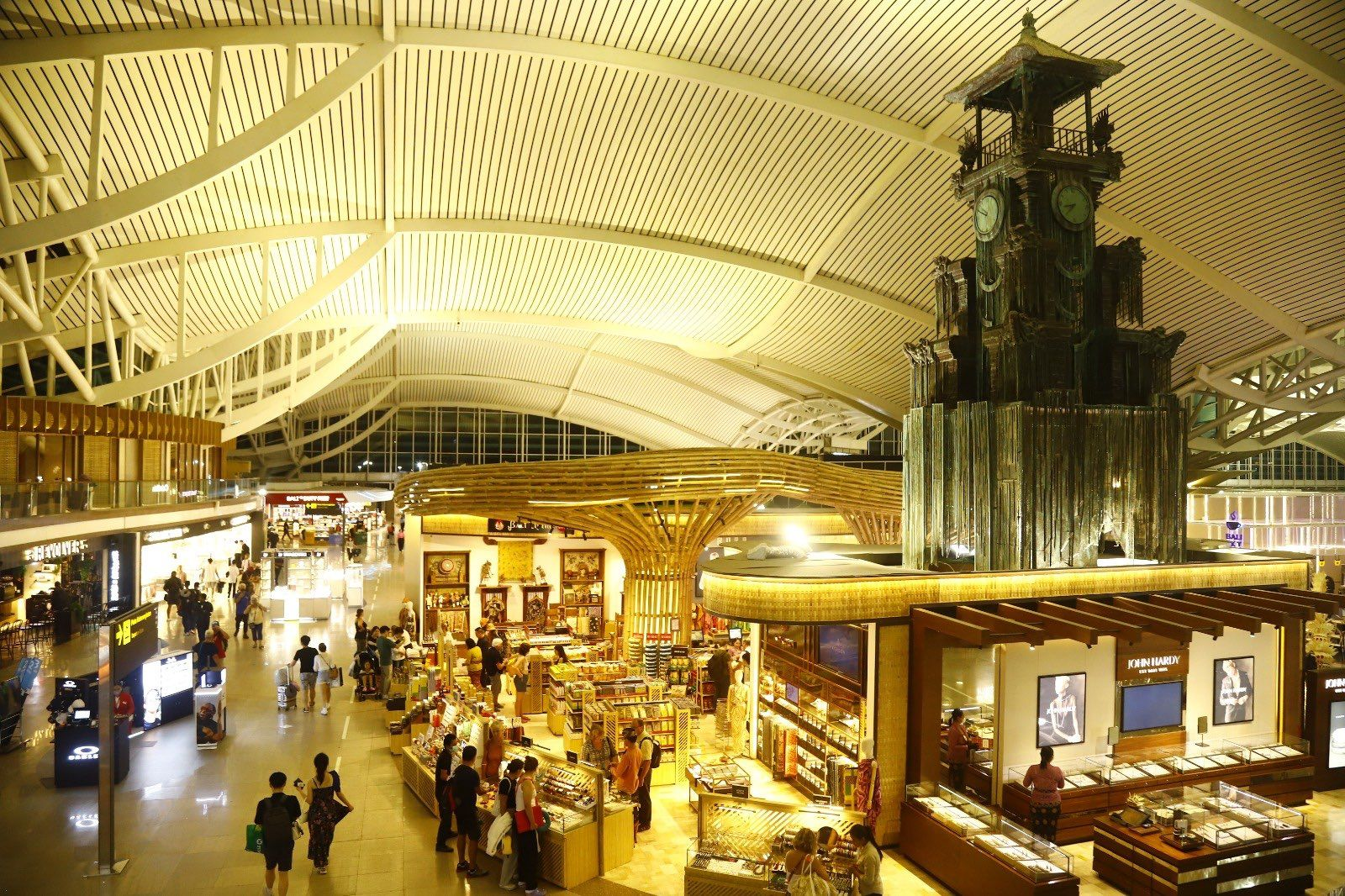
Commercial area of the international terminal

Opened to the public on 17 September 2014, the new domestic terminal is approximately four times larger than its predecessor, covering 65,800 m^{2} compared to the former terminal's 13,300 m^{2}. It occupies the site of the previous international terminal, which underwent extensive renovation following the opening of the new international terminal in 2013. The terminal has a capacity of up to 9.4 million passengers per year and is equipped with 62 check-in counters, four transit and transfer counters, eight boarding gates, and seven arrival gates, supported by eight aerobridges and five baggage conveyor belts. The terminal is equipped with five baggage claim belts, as well as ATM facilities and more spacious restrooms. The total cost of the terminal renovation was approximately Rp 318 billion. In addition, the terminal features a large new commercial area concept. The commercial layout is based on several principles, including simplifying passenger flow, expanding retail space in the central zone, diversifying and integrating different commercial formats, and providing designated last-minute shopping areas. These improvements ensure that all passengers pass through the main commercial area.

==== International terminal ====
Construction of the new international terminal began in May 2011 and was completed in 2013. The new terminal was brought into operation in phases, with international arrivals commencing on 19 September 2013, followed by international departures on 29 September 2013, few days before the pre-event activities of the 2013 APEC summit started. The terminal has an area of 120,000 m^{2} and features 96 check-in counters and nine waiting lounges equipped with 11 aerobridges. It also includes seven baggage claim belts, 20 visa-on-arrival counters, 26 immigration counters, and three customs counters, and is capable of accommodating up to 16 million passengers annually. The terminal is designed with a modern architectural style infused with traditional Balinese elements. It is equipped with advanced baggage screening technology, including electronic inspection systems introduced in Indonesia for the first time, namely the Hold Baggage Screening (HBS) and Baggage Handling System (BHS). The total construction cost of the terminal was approximately Rp 2 trillion. As part of the development, an integrated building, parking structure, school complex, promenade, and aero food catering service facilities were also constructed.

=== Accommodating the Airbus A380 ===
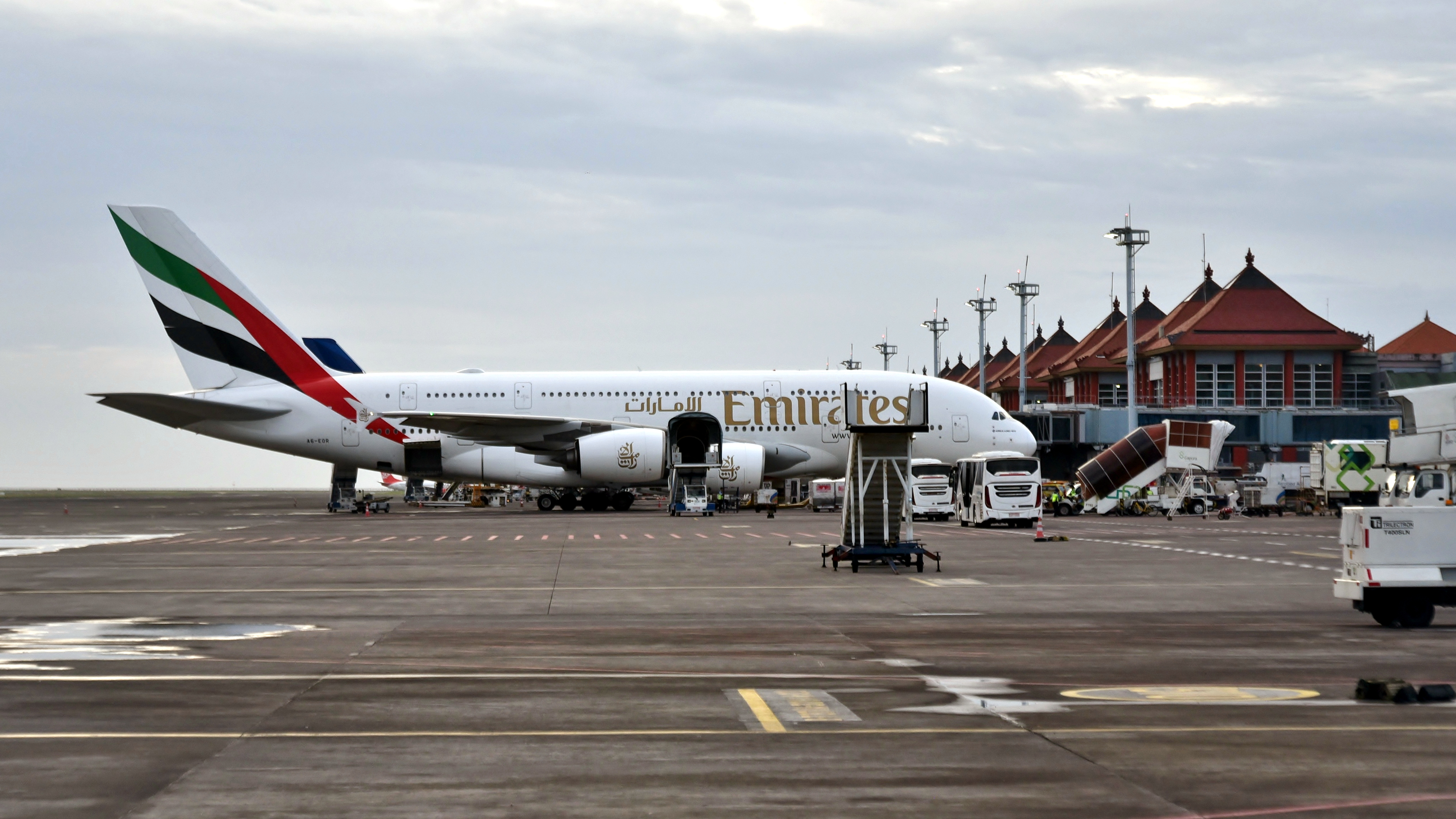
Emirates Airbus A380 at Ngurah Rai International Airport

The international terminal is also equipped with a double-deck aerobridge, installed in 2015, specifically designed to accommodate the Airbus A380. On 1 June 2023, an Emirates Airbus A380 landed at Ngurah Rai International Airport, marking the first scheduled commercial A380 service in Indonesia. The flight replaced one of Emirates' previous twice-daily Boeing 777-300ER services to Bali. The change was made in response to strong demand for international travel to the island.

==== VVIP terminal ====
To support the arrivals and departures of heads of state and representatives of international organizations attending the 2022 G20 Bali Summit, a new VVIP terminal was inaugurated by President Joko Widodo on 9 November 2022. Construction of the facility had commenced on 14 March 2022. In response to the increasing volume of private jet traffic—around 500 movements per month—the airport authority also developed a dedicated apron on the southern side of the airport, complete with a special access gate, capable of accommodating up to 14 general aviation aircraft. The VVIP terminal is designed in a traditional Balinese architectural style known as Wantilan, a pavilion-like structure historically used as a communal meeting hall in Balinese society. The design is further enriched with Balinese decorative elements, including carvings, ornaments, paintings, and local cultural features such as Balinese songket textiles, native plants like Jepun Bali, Pucuk Rajuna, and Jempiring, as well as artistic statues depicting Garuda and Singa Ambara Raja. The scope of the VVIP terminal revitalization ncludes beautification of the existing VVIP terminal (1,063 m^{2}), construction of a new VVIP terminal (1,000 m^{2}), landscaping and development of a new service road (3,250 m^{2}), and relocation of cargo facilities and affected buildings (300 m^{2}).

==== Airport hotel ====
Novotel Bali Ngurah Rai Airport is a four-star hotel located inside the airport complex with direct access to domestic and international terminals. This hotel has 206 rooms and other supporting facilities such as meeting rooms, fitness center, swimming pool, restaurant, and rooftop bar.

=== Developments ===
Since 2023, the airport has undertaken and completed several infrastructure development and beautification projects. These include the expansion of the security checkpoint (SCP) area and the addition of four passenger screening lanes in both the domestic and international terminals. On the landside, traffic flow has been improved through the widening of internal airport roads from two lanes to four lanes, covering both inbound and outbound routes. Further enhancements include the construction of new passenger pick-up shelters, the development of a pedestrian bridge, and the establishment of green spaces at various points within the landside area. The airport is currently preparing the construction of a connecting gate between the international and domestic terminals to facilitate passenger transfers.

Additional planned works include the expansion of corridor areas, beautification of check-in counters, construction of a connecting pier gate at the international terminal, and improvements to toilet facilities in both the domestic and international terminals. The connecting gate is designed to enhance service quality and improve the overall customer experience, particularly for passengers making international–domestic or domestic–international transfers. Currently, transfer passengers are required to exit one terminal and move to another according to their flight routes. With the planned connecting gate directly linking the international and domestic terminals, passenger convenience is expected to improve significantly, while transfer processing time is reduced.

In December 2024, a Maintenance, Repair, and Overhaul (MRO) facility operated by FL Technics Indonesia was inaugurated at the airport. The facility is capable of accommodating up to six narrow-body aircraft and is built on a 17,000 m² site. It primarily serves Boeing and Airbus narrow-body fleets. The MRO hangar offers a comprehensive range of services, including line maintenance, base maintenance, heavy maintenance, logistics support, a bonded logistics center, and other integrated services, as well as training facilities. As part of its commitment to operational reliability, the facility also provides round-the-clock Aircraft on Ground (AOG) support, enabling rapid response to unexpected technical issues and minimizing aircraft downtime.

The airport is planned for further expansion to raise its capacity to 37 million passengers annually, as the current infrastructure can accommodate up to 24 million passengers per year. Key facilities, including the apron and runway, will be expanded through approximately 117 hectares of land reclamation, necessitated by limited available land. The project will be implemented in two phases. In the first phase, 47 hectares of land will be reclaimed, which is expected to increase capacity to around 28 million passengers annually. In the second phase, an additional 70 hectares will be reclaimed, enabling the runway to be extended from 3,000 meters to 3,400 meters. This extension is intended to allow larger aircraft to operate at the airport without operational restrictions.

==== New airport ====
With growing air traffic congestion, I Gusti Ngurah Rai International Airport is approaching its maximum capacity due to its single runway and limited space for further expansion. It is estimated that the airport may still be able to accommodate traffic growth over the next 5 to 10 years. However, beyond that period, continued passenger growth could lead to operational overload if no additional capacity is developed.

In response to these constraints, a proposal has been made to develop a new airport in northern Bali, specifically in the eastern part of Buleleng Regency. The proposed North Bali Airport is expected to strengthen air connectivity on the island and serve as a supporting hub for I Gusti Ngurah Rai International Airport in handling increasing tourist arrivals and national economic activity. However, the project has faced significant opposition. Former President Megawati Soekarnoputri, among others, has expressed concerns that the project may constitute a waste of public funds. Some stakeholders argue that I Gusti Ngurah Rai International Airport still has potential for further development, while others highlight that northern Bali currently lacks adequate supporting infrastructure to sustain a major airport.

In 2022, the government removed eight projects from the National Strategic Projects (PSN) list, including the North Bali Airport. President Prabowo Subianto publicly expressed support for the construction of the North Bali Airport during his 2024 election campaign. Following his election victory, the project was subsequently reinstated into the PSN list in 2025. The plan proposes that the airport will be developed on an artificial island of approximately 900 hectares in the Kubutambahan area of Buleleng Regency. The project also envisions the development of a new metropolitan city integrated with the airport, including five star hotels, a convention center, and a dedicated film industry zone branded as "Baliwood." To support connectivity, the site is planned to be linked by a 60 km toll road connecting Kubutambahan to Mengwi, as well as a railway connection extending to I Gusti Ngurah Rai International Airport.

== Airlines and destinations ==
=== Passenger ===
Airlines	Destinations
Aero Dili	Dili
Aeroflot	Moscow–Sheremetyevo
Air Busan	Busan
Air India	Delhi–Indira Gandhi
Air New Zealand	Auckland
AirAsia	Kuala Lumpur–International
Airfast Indonesia	Charter: Jakarta–Soekarno-Hatta, Timika
Batik Air	Jakarta–Halim Perdanakusuma, Jakarta–Soekarno-Hatta, Kupang, Labuan Bajo, Makassar, Perth, Surabaya, Tambolaka
Batik Air Malaysia	Brisbane, Kuala Lumpur–International, Kuala Lumpur–Subang (begins 2 December 2026), Melbourne, Perth, Sydney–Kingsford Smith
Cathay Pacific	Hong Kong
Cebu Pacific	Manila
China Airlines	Taipei–Taoyuan
China Eastern Airlines	Beijing–Daxing, Shanghai–Pudong
China Southern Airlines	Guangzhou
Citilink	Bandung–Husein Sastranegara, Dili, Jakarta–Halim Perdanakusuma, Jakarta–Soekarno-Hatta, Makassar, Surabaya
Condor	Seasonal charter: Bangkok–Suvarnabhumi, Frankfurt
Emirates	Dubai–International
Etihad Airways	Abu Dhabi
EVA Air	Taipei–Taoyuan
Garuda Indonesia	Bandung–Husein Sastranegara, Jakarta–Soekarno-Hatta, Melbourne, Singapore, Sorong, Surabaya, Sydney–Kingsford Smith, Timika, Tokyo–Narita, Yogyakarta–International
Hong Kong Airlines	Hong Kong
IndiGo	Bengaluru, Delhi–Indira Gandhi, Mumbai–Shivaji (resumes 1 March 2027)
Indonesia AirAsia	Jakarta–Soekarno-Hatta, Labuan Bajo, Perth, Phuket
Jeju Air	Seoul–Incheon
Jetstar	Adelaide, Avalon, Brisbane, Cairns, Darwin, Gold Coast, Melbourne, Newcastle, Perth, Singapore, Sunshine Coast, Sydney–Kingsford Smith, Sydney–Western (begins 15 March 2027)
Juneyao Air	Shanghai–Pudong
KLM	Amsterdam, Singapore
Korean Air	Seoul–Incheon
Lion Air	Balikpapan, Banjarmasin, Jakarta–Soekarno-Hatta, Makassar, Manado, Surabaya; Seasonal: Lombok
LOT Polish Airlines	Seasonal charter: Warsaw–Chopin
Malaysia Airlines	Kuala Lumpur–International
NAM Air	Jakarta–Soekarno-Hatta, Labuan Bajo (begins 27 November 2026), Tambolaka
Pelita Air	Jakarta–Soekarno-Hatta
Philippine Airlines	Manila
Qanot Sharq	Seasonal charter: Tashkent
Qantas	Brisbane (begins 1 August 2027), Melbourne, Sydney–Kingsford Smith
Qatar Airways	Doha
Saudia	Jeddah, Singapore
Scoot	Singapore
Sichuan Airlines	Chengdu–Tianfu
Singapore Airlines	Singapore
Sriwijaya Air	Jakarta–Soekarno-Hatta, Makassar
Starlux Airlines	Taipei–Taoyuan
Super Air Jet	Bandung–Husein Sastranegara, Jakarta–Soekarno-Hatta, Kupang, Medan, Pontianak, Semarang, Solo, Surabaya, Yogyakarta–International
Thai AirAsia	Bangkok–Don Mueang
Thai Airways International	Bangkok–Suvarnabhumi
Thai Lion Air	Bangkok–Don Mueang
TransNusa	Bima, Guangzhou, Jakarta–Soekarno-Hatta, Kuala Lumpur–International (begins 10 December 2026), Lombok, Manado, Melbourne, Perth, Phuket, Singapore, Surabaya, Waingapu, Wakatobi
Turkish Airlines	Istanbul
VietJet Air	Hanoi, Ho Chi Minh City
Vietnam Airlines	Ho Chi Minh City
Virgin Australia	Brisbane, Gold Coast, Melbourne, Sydney–Kingsford Smith; Seasonal: Canberra
Wings Air	Bima, Lombok, Sumbawa Besar
XiamenAir	Xiamen

=== Cargo ===
Airlines	Destinations
Garuda Indonesia Cargo	Hong Kong, Sydney–Kingsford Smith, Tokyo–Narita

== Statistics ==
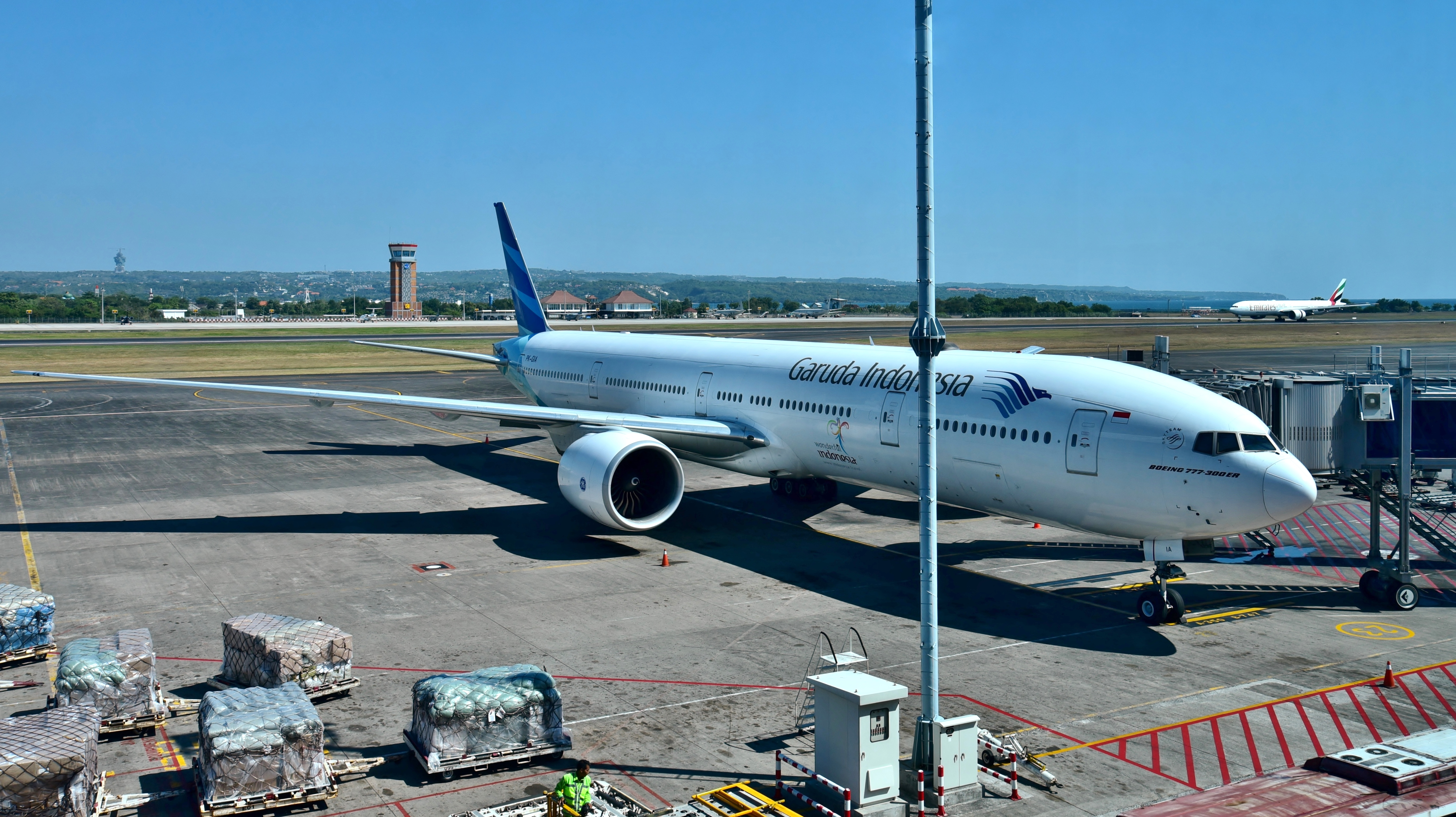
Garuda Indonesia Boeing 777-300ER at Ngurah Rai International Airport

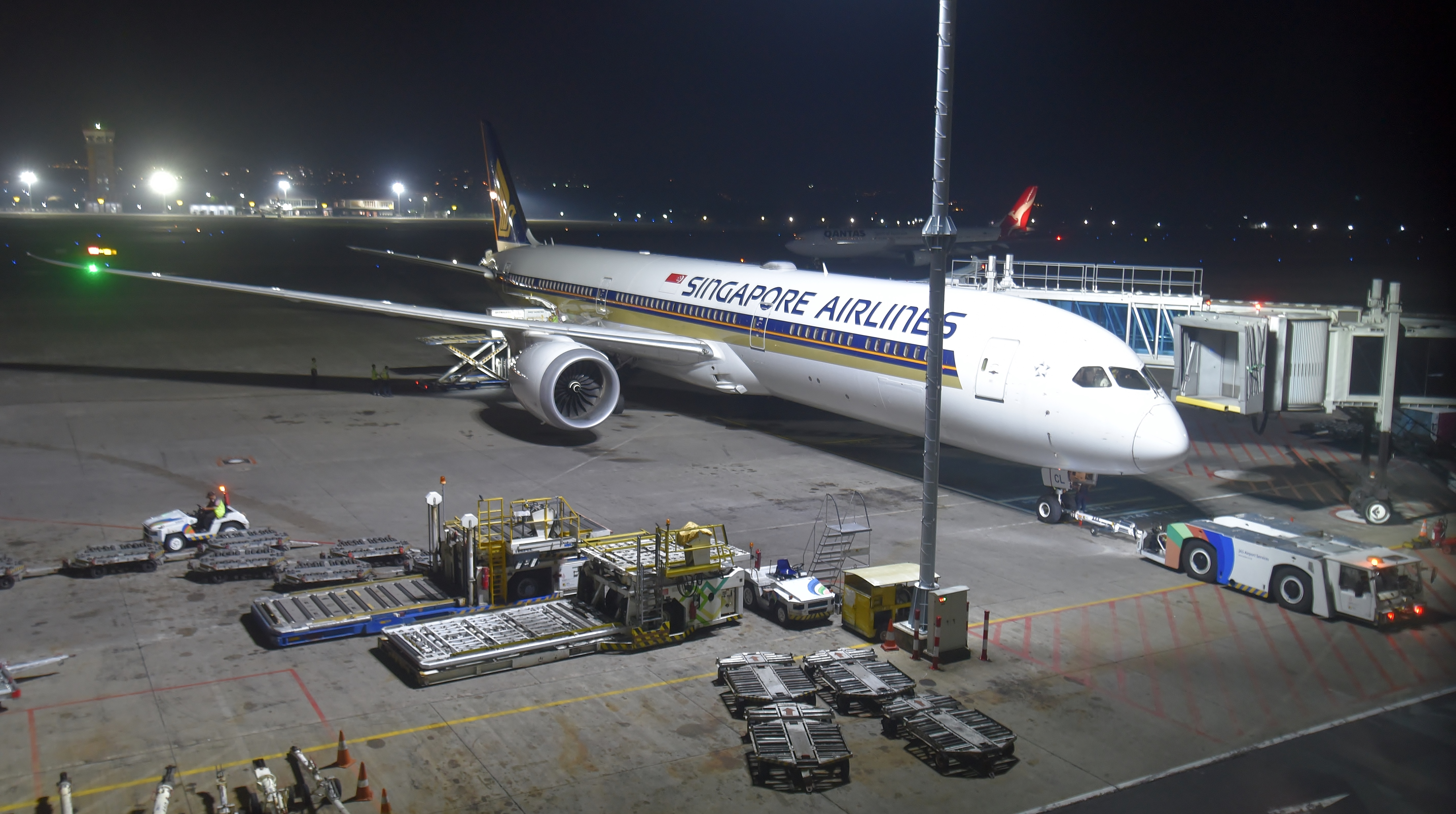
Singapore Airlines Boeing 787-10 at Ngurah Rai International Airport

Annual passenger numbers and aircraft statistics
Year	Passengers handled	Passenger % change	Cargo (tonnes)	Cargo % change	Aircraft movements	Aircraft % change
2002	4,829,077	Steady	57,616.55	Steady	46,049	Steady
2003	4,542,626	▼5.93	53,473.21	▼7.19	47,381	▲2.89
2004	6,024,949	▲32.63	56,234.64	▲5.16	58,819	▲24.14
2005	6,506,207	▲7.99	57,050.30	▲1.45	63,229	▲7.50
2006	6,296,423	▼3.22	44,618.26	▼21.79	59,280	▼6.25
2007	7,602,052	▲20.74	51,297.27	▲14.97	62,693	▲5.76
2008	8,470,566	▲11.42	57,021.89	▲11.16	69,726	▲11.22
2009	9,621,714	▲13.59	64,924.47	▲13.86	76,754	▲10.08
2010	11,120,171	▲15.57	67,713.87	▲4.30	84,958	▲10.69
2011	12,780,563	▲14.93	62,149.90	▼8.22	103,846	▲22.23
2012	12,634,644	▼1.14	43,359.89	▼30.23	87,011	▼16.21
2013	15,631,839	▲23.72	54,099.74	▲24.77	124,557	▲43.15
2014	17,271,415	▲10.49	50,390.96	▼6.86	130,152	▲4.49
2015	17,108,387	▼0.94	30,860.39	▼38.76	125,594	▼3.50
2016	20,007,922	▲16.95	51,560.08	▲67.08	138,276	▲10.10
2017	21,047,746	▲5.20	70,440.37	▲36.62	145,931	▲5.54
2018	23,773,714	▲12.95	73,332.64	▲4.11	161,909	▲10.95
2019	24,168,133	▲1.66	139,172.29	▲89.78	155,148	▼4.18
2020	6,237,878	▼74.19	50,089.34	▼64.01	56,039	▼63.88
2021	3,778,807	▼39.42	31,319.93	▼37.47	36,233	▼35.34
2022	12,523,546	▲231.42	36,301.94	▲15.91	87,587	▲141.73
2023	21,453,169	▲71.30	52,681.61	▲45.12	136,322	▲55.64
2024	23,931,016	▲11.55	69,704.55	▲32.31	142,172	▲4.29
^{Source: DGCA, Angkasa Pura I}

Busiest domestic routes (2024)
Rank	Airport	Passengers	% change 2023/24
1	Jakarta, Jakarta (all airports)	2,587,911	▼5.20
2	Surabaya, East Java	689,218	▲4.23
3	Makassar, South Sulawesi	243,517	▲1.28
4	Labuan Bajo, East Nusa Tenggara	228,882	▲27.42
5	Yogyakarta, Yogyakarta	203,785	▲1.47
6	Lombok, West Nusa Tenggara	127,335	▲13.93
7	Balikpapan, East Kalimantan	108,716	▲21.56
8	Bandung, West Java (all airports)	95,407	▼50.03
9	Solo, Central Java	85,290	▼35.16
10	Banjarmasin, South Kalimantan	76,559	▲535.46

Total passenger movements by countries (2024)
Rank	Country	Passengers movement	% change 2023/24
1	Australia	1,959,582	▲18.05
2	Singapore	1,400,284	▲10.05
3	Malaysia	876,064	▲28.30
4	United Arab Emirates	371,779	▲16.65
5	Qatar	350,364	▲20.71
6	China	339,004	▲105.45
7	Vietnam	264,031	▲6.10
8	South Korea	224,283	▲51.65
9	Hong Kong	206,771	▲51.61
10	Taiwan	204,438	▲11.34

== Ground transportations ==
=== Road ===
Ngurah Rai International Airport is connected by highway via Bali Mandara Toll Road to many well known tourist destinations in Bali such as Nusa Dua, Sanur, Tanjung Benoa, as well as to the city of Denpasar and Port of Benoa.

=== Bus ===
As of January 2026, one bus rapid transit corridor serves Ngurah Rai International Airport.

Network	Corridor	Route	Operating Hours
Trans Metro Dewata	K2	Terminal Ubung – Bandara Ngurah Rai	5:00 AM – 6:40 PM

=== Rail ===
The airport is planned to be connected by a light rail transit (LRT) system in the future. The proposed line would link the airport with Kuta, Legian, and eventually Mengwi, with the initial phase prioritizing the airport–Kuta segment due to high passenger demand. The construction of Bali LRT Phase 1 is planned to be financed through a loan from South Korea, which has also committed to conducting a feasibility study for the project. The system was originally scheduled to commence construction in 2024. Groundbreaking took place in September 2024. However, as of 2026, the project has not yet been realised due to a lack of investors, as stated by the Ministry of Transportation.

== Accidents and incidents ==
Year	Date	Event	Casualties
1974	22 April	Pan Am Flight 812, a Boeing 707, crashed into a mountain while preparing for final approach.	All 107 passengers and crew were killed.
1978	5 October	Douglas C-47A PK-NDI of Merpati Nusantara Airlines caught fire whilst parked and was destroyed.	
2013	13 April	Lion Air Flight 904 with 101 passengers and seven crew members aboard undershot the runway while landing and ditched in the open sea. The airplane was arriving from Bandung, West Java.	All 101 passengers and seven crew survived. 22 were injured.
