= Sultan Muhammad Salahudin Airport =

Airport in Bima, West Nusa Tenggara, Indonesia

Sultan Muhammad Salahuddin Airport Bandar Udara Sultan Muhammad Salahuddin
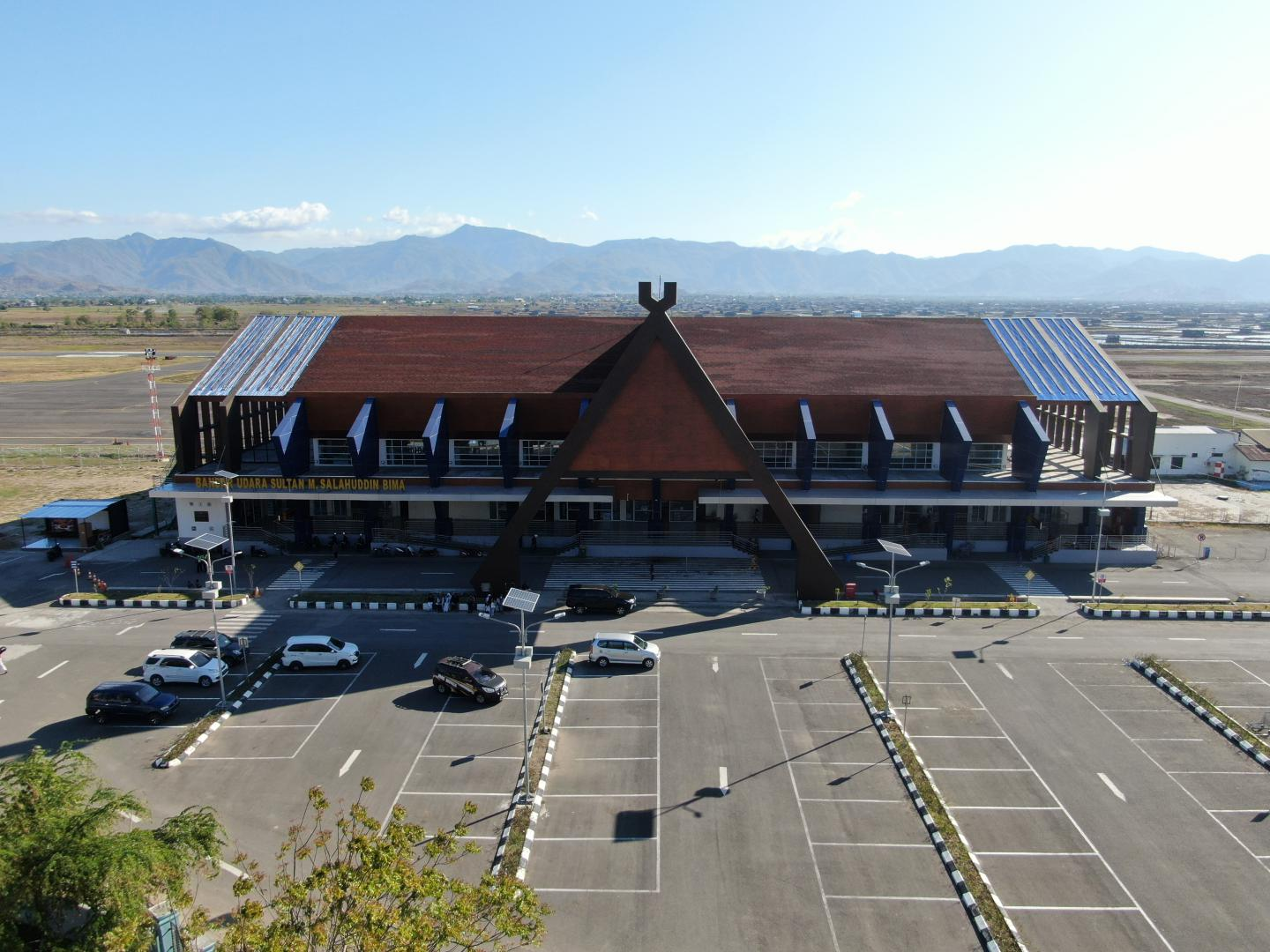
- IATA: BMU; ICAO: WADB

Summary
- Airport type: Public
- Owner: Government of Indonesia
- Operator: Directorate General of Civil Aviation
- Serves: Bima, West Nusa Tenggara, Indonesia
- Location: Sumbawa
- Time zone: WITA (UTC+08:00)
- Elevation AMSL: 3 ft / 1 m
- Coordinates: 08°32′23″S 118°41′14″E

Map
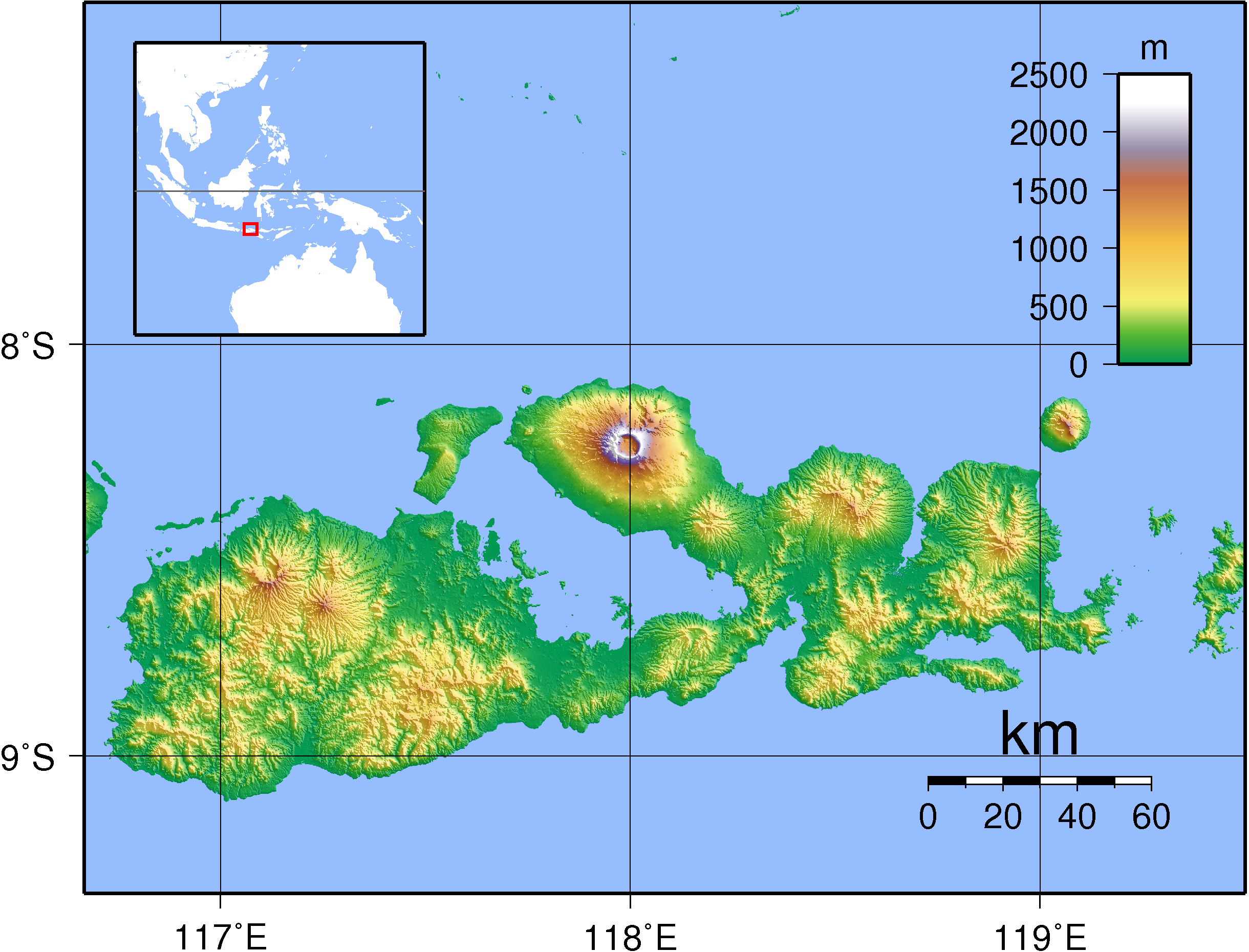
- Location in Sumbawa Location in the Lesser Sunda Islands

Runways
| Direction | Length | | Surface |
| Direction | ft | m | Surface |
|---|---|---|---|
| 13/31 | 7,218 | 2,200 | Asphalt |

Statistics (2024)
- Passengers: 123,028 (▼13.39%)
- Cargo (tonnes): 91.62 (▼4.80%)
- Aircraft movements: 2,426 (▼15.73%)
- Source: DGCA

Sultan Muhammad Salahuddin Airport (IATA: BMU, ICAO: WADB) is a domestic airport located approximately 10 kilometres (6.2 mi) to the south of the city of Bima, the largest town on the island of Sumbawa, West Nusa Tenggara, Indonesia. The airport was previously known as Palibelo Airport (IATA: PBW, ICAO: WRRB), named after the district in which it is located. The name was later discontinued when the airport was renamed in honor of Sultan Muhammad Salahuddin, the last ruler of the Bima Sultanate and a national hero of Indonesia. The airport is the largest and busiest in Sumbawa, and one of only two airports on the island that serve regular scheduled flights, the other being Sultan Muhammad Kaharuddin III Airport in Sumbawa Besar in the western part of Sumbawa. It serves as the main gateway to Bima and the eastern region of the island, with regular flights to Denpasar, Lombok, and Makassar.

== History ==
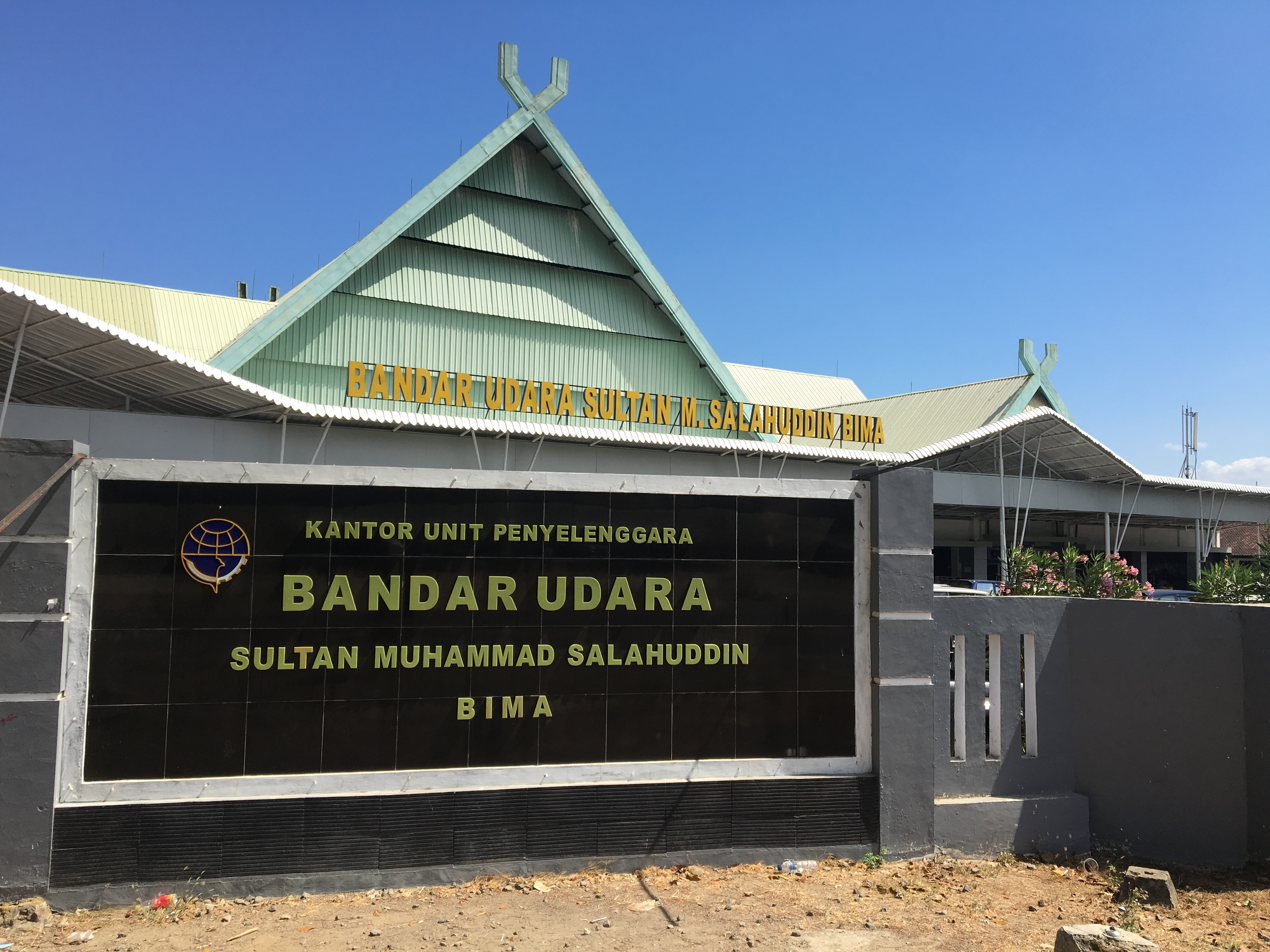
The former terminal, now demolished

The first recorded aircraft to land at what is now Sultan Muhammad Salahuddin Airport was a Vickers Vimy on 9 December 1919, piloted by Captain Ross Macpherson Smith alongside his brother, Lieutenant Keith Macpherson Smith, as part of their historic 1919 England–Australia flight from London to Darwin. The aircraft made a brief stop in Bima to refuel, with fuel supplied by the Bataafse Petroleum Maatschappij (BPM), before continuing to Kupang and ultimately Australia. In 1920, another notable aviator, John Cowe McIntosh, also carried out an emergency landing at Palibelo when his aircraft was forced to refuel in Bima. The selection of Palibelo by the Smith brothers was not coincidental, as the site proved to be strategically important from an aeronautical perspective. In the years that followed, several prominent aviators used the location as a stopover. Among them was Amy Johnson, who in 1930 became the first woman to fly solo from England to Australia and also stopped at Palibelo for refueling. Amy Johnson’s visit coincided with the birth of the fifth daughter of Sultan Muhammad Salahuddin. Inspired by her achievements as a pioneering female aviator, the Sultan named his daughter Amy.

Further development of Bima Airport began after it was used as a landing ground during the 1920 “Great Britain” air race. In 1927, formal measurements of the runway were conducted, and it has since reached a length of 1,647 meters. By the 1930s, a small commercial airport had been established at the site, operated by KLM. Initially, the airport had only a simple runway made of woven bamboo. During the Pacific War in World War II, the airfield was used by the Royal Australian Air Force (RAAF) as a transit and refueling point after it joined Allied operations in the campaign against Japan.

Following the end of the war, the airport was handed over to the newly independent Indonesian government and began serving commercial flights. In the 1960s, Zamrud Aviation Corporation introduced a route connecting Bima and Makassar, which operated for several years before being discontinued. In 1962, Merpati Nusantara Airlines also launched services on the same route, maintaining operations until the 1980s. Decades later, Sabang Merauke Raya Air Charter (SMAC) revived the Bima–Makassar route in 2011 using a CASA C-212 Aviocar, albeit with a stopover in Selayar. Merpati Nusantara Airlines briefly reinstated the route in early 2012 with a Xian MA-60, but the service ended in February 2014 when the airline ceased operations. At present, the Bima–Makassar route is served exclusively by Wings Air.

== Facilities and development ==
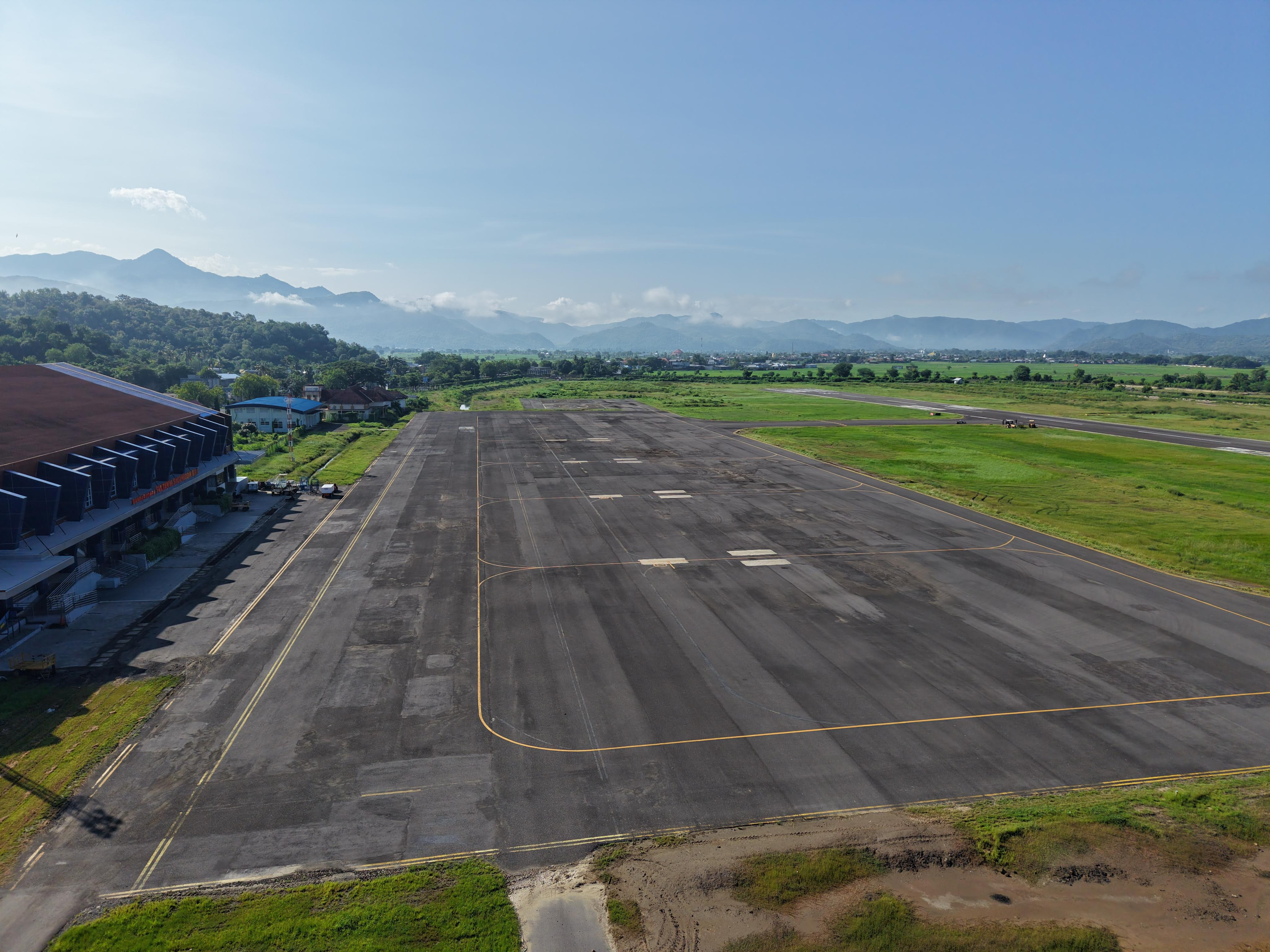
Apron view of the airport

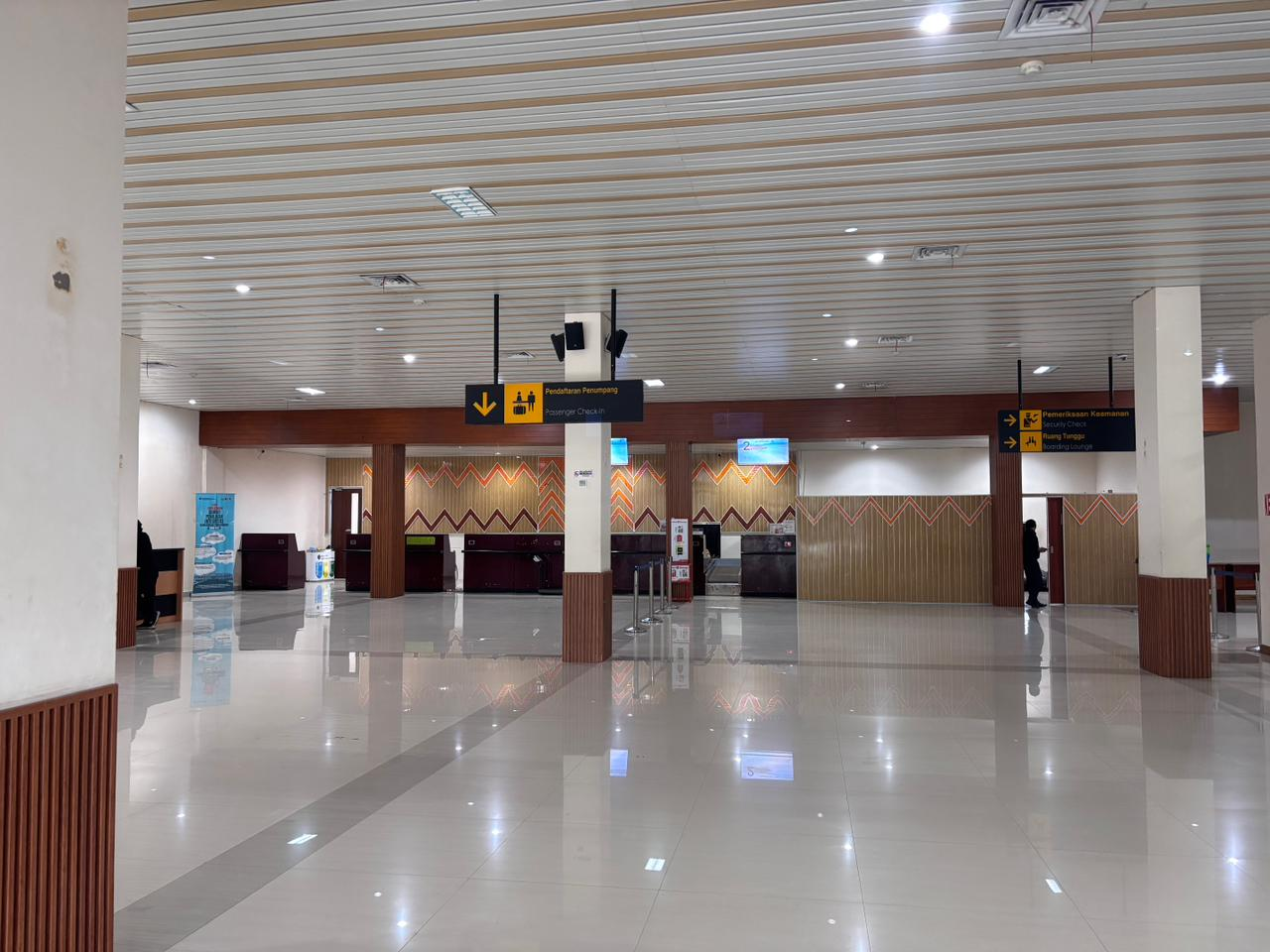
Check-in hall

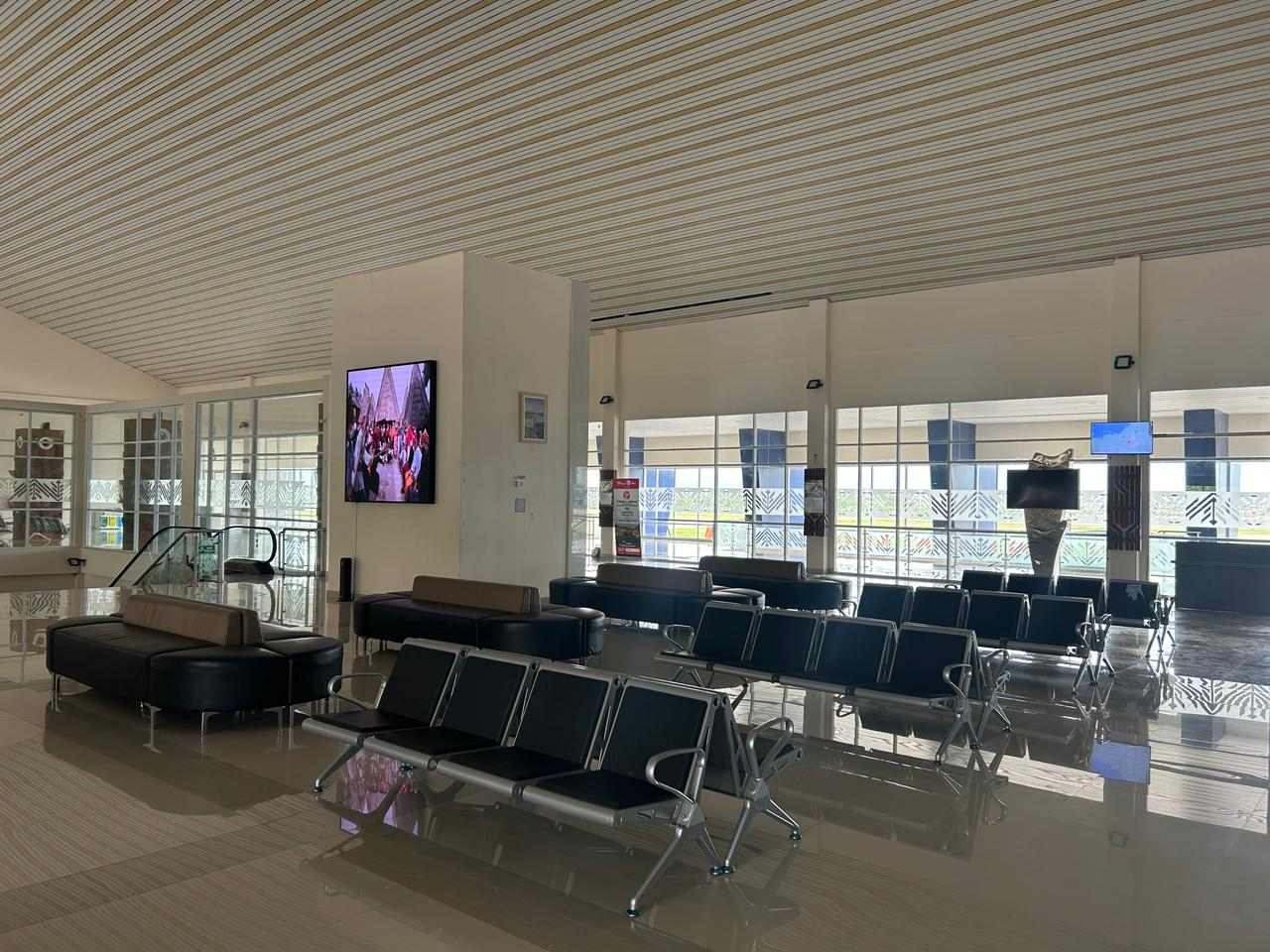
Boarding hall

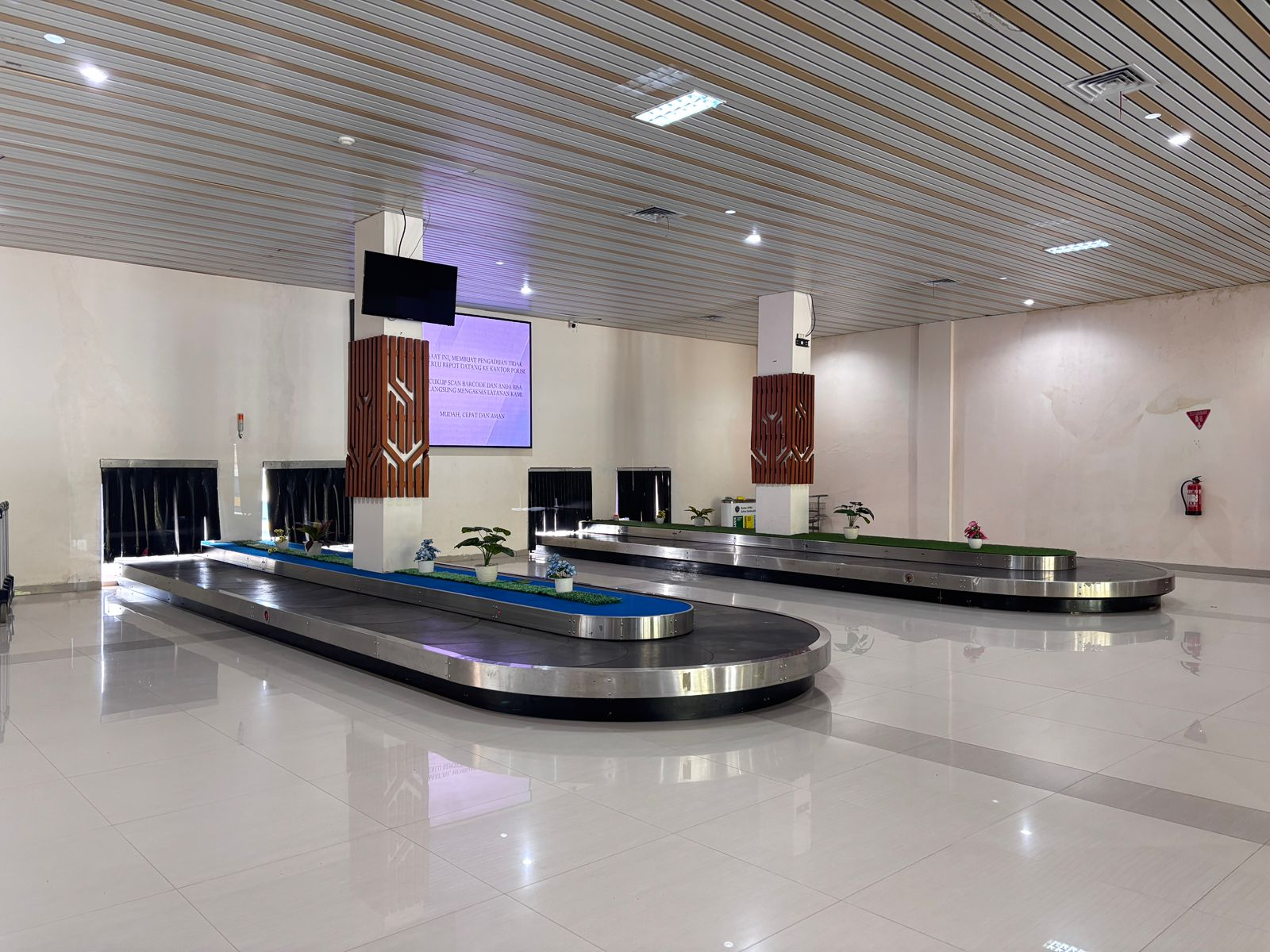
Baggage claim area

A major expansion of the airport was carried out between 2010 and 2020. This included the construction of a larger passenger terminal to replace the old facility, which had been operating beyond its capacity due to rising passenger numbers. The runway was also extended from 1,650 m × 30 m to 2,200 m × 30 m, enabling it to accommodate narrow-body aircraft such as the Boeing 737. There are further plans to extend the runway to 2,500 m; however, this has been delayed due to land acquisition and clearance issues. The new terminal began operations in September 2021, while the old terminal was demolished to make way for a new cargo terminal, as well as the expansion of the apron and parking areas. Covering an area of 5,000 m², the new terminal consists of two floors and is equipped with international-standard facilities, featuring a larger and more spacious check-in hall and boarding gates.

== Airlines and destinations ==
| Airlines | Destinations |
|---|---|
| TransNusa | Denpasar |
| Wings Air | Denpasar, Lombok, Makassar |

== Statistics ==
Annual passenger numbers and aircraft statistics
| Year | Passengers handled | Passenger % change | Cargo (tonnes) | Cargo % change | Aircraft movements | Aircraft % change |
|---|---|---|---|---|---|---|
| 2006 | 39,841 | Steady | 129.15 | Steady | 853 | Steady |
| 2007 | 36,928 | ▼7.31 | 155.21 | ▲20.18 | 710 | ▼16.76 |
| 2008 | 58,975 | ▲59.70 | 188.64 | ▲21.54 | 1,058 | ▲49.01 |
| 2009 | 74,004 | ▲25.48 | 156.82 | ▼16.87 | 1,486 | ▲40.45 |
| 2010 | 71,042 | ▼4.00 | 74.25 | ▼52.65 | 1,516 | ▲2.02 |
| 2011 | 82,334 | ▲15.89 | 63.87 | ▼13.98 | 1,982 | ▲30.74 |
| 2012 | 115,256 | ▲39.99 | 112.70 | ▲76.45 | 2,701 | ▲36.28 |
| 2013 | 152,973 | ▲32.72 | 88.68 | ▼21.31 | 3,198 | ▲18.40 |
| 2014 | 112,105 | ▼26.72 | 64.83 | ▼26.89 | 3,728 | ▲16.57 |
| 2015 | 152,140 | ▲35.71 | 212.80 | ▲228.24 | 2,631 | ▼29.43 |
| 2016 | 245,381 | ▲61.29 | 116.64 | ▼45.19 | 4,301 | ▲63.47 |
| 2017 | 295,732 | ▲20.52 | 124.10 | ▲6.40 | 5,507 | ▲28.04 |
| 2018 | 381,815 | ▲29.11 | 164.74 | ▲32.75 | 6,133 | ▲11.37 |
| 2019 | 308,233 | ▼19.27 | 113.92 | ▼30.85 | 5,230 | ▼14.72 |
| 2020 | 171,908 | ▼44.23 | 79.61 | ▼30.12 | 3,214 | ▼38.55 |
| 2021 | 129,389 | ▼24.73 | 73.96 | ▼7.10 | 2,456 | ▼23.58 |
| 2022 | 143,979 | ▲11.28 | 79.37 | ▲7.31 | 2,442 | ▼0.57 |
| 2023 | 142,048 | ▼1.34 | 96.24 | ▲21.25 | 2,879 | ▲17.90 |
| 2024 | 123,028 | ▼13.39 | 91.62 | ▼4.80 | 2,426 | ▼15.73 |
^{Source: DGCA, BPS}

== Accidents and incidents ==
- On 27 March 2023, Wings Air Flight 1865, bound for Lombok from Bima, aborted its takeoff due to a mechanical issue. The aircraft had already entered the runway and was preparing for departure when the pilot decided to return to the terminal. None of the 65 passengers were injured.
