= Sultan Muhammad Kaharuddin III Airport =

Sultan Muhammad Kaharuddin III Airport Bandar Udara Sultan Muhammad Kaharuddin III
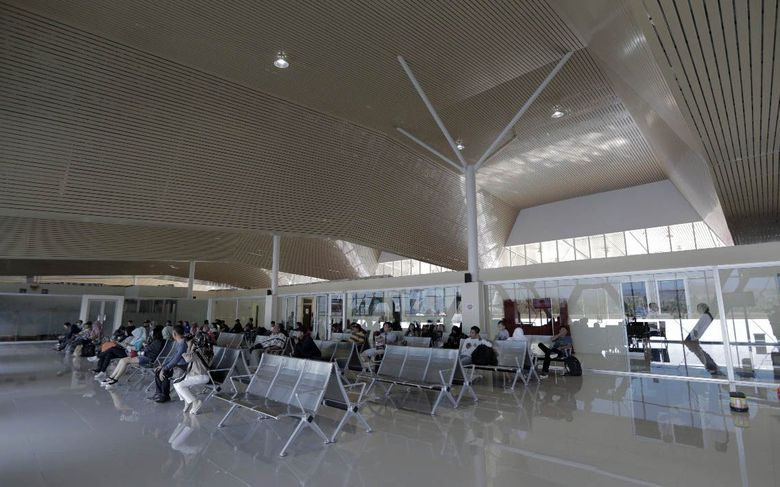
- IATA: SWQ; ICAO: WADS

Summary
- Airport type: Public
- Owner: West Nusa Tenggara provincial government
- Operator: UPT Director General of Transportation
- Serves: Sumbawa Besar
- Location: Sumbawa Besar, West Nusa Tenggara, Indonesia
- Time zone: WITA (UTC+08:00)
- Elevation AMSL: 19 ft / 5.79 m
- Coordinates: 08°29′19″S 117°24′51.01″E

Map
- Location of the airport in Indonesia

Runways
Direction	Length		Surface
Direction	ft	m	Surface
14/32	5,413	1,800	Asphalt

Statistics (2024)
- Passengers: 61986

Sultan Muhammad Kaharuddin III Airport (IATA: SWQ, ICAO: WADS), formerly Brang Bidji Airport, is located in Sumbawa Besar, West Nusa Tenggara, Indonesia. It is one of the only two airports in the island of Sumbawa, the other being Sultan Muhammad Salahudin Airport in Bima. The airport is named after Sultan Muhammad Kaharuddin III (1902-1975), the last sultan of the Sultanate of Sumbawa.

Currently, the airport have daily flights to Lombok and Denpasar. With two daily flights each operated by Wings Air and both flights are operated by the ATR-72 aircraft.

In 2015, 77,365 passengers used the airport, and in 2017 this increased to 112,096. In 2024, following the COVID-19 pandemic, 61,986 passengers used the airport.

== Airport development ==
To improve economic growth and cope with the increasing passenger growth every year, the airport was renovated in 2016, both airside and landside. The work carried out was apron widening and taxiway construction including supervision, construction of inspection roads with asphalt concrete, airport fence rehabilitation, construction of new terminals including supervision and fulfillment of runway strip standards due to runway extension. In addition, the apron was expanded from 70 x 240 m to 80 x 240 m, expansion of parking area, addition of new fences, procurement and installation of runway RTIL, procurement and installation of apron and taxiway light due to apron expansion and manufacture of new taxiways, procurement and installation of flood double light pole.

Currently the new terminal has an area of 2,790 m^{2}, four times wider than the old terminal which is only 840 m^{2} in size. The arrival room also expanded from 96 m^{2} to 480 m^{2}. While the waiting room is also expanded from 120 m^{2} to 960 m^{2}. The new terminal has the typical architectural concept of the Sumbawa traditional house.

The development of the airport was scheduled to be continued in 2019. Plans included the extension of the runway from 1650 mx 30 m to 1800 mx 30 m, including marking, preparation of runway strips and RESA as well as air side channels, canopy work and terminal building interiors, renovation work administration building, PKP-PK access road widening work, land side landscape work, procurement and installation of integrated lightning rods, procurement and installation of solar cell street lights, preparation of BKK, DLKR and DLKP studies and airport development supervision work.

== Airlines and destinations ==
Airlines	Destinations
Wings Air	Denpasar, Lombok

== Statistics ==
Frequency of flights at Sultan Muhammad Kaharuddin III Airport (April 2024)
Rank	Destinations	Frequency (weekly)	Airline(s)
1	Lombok	daily	Wings Air
