= Lombok International Airport =

Airport serving Lombok, West Nusa Tenggara, Indonesia

Lombok International Airport Bandar Udara Internasional Lombok
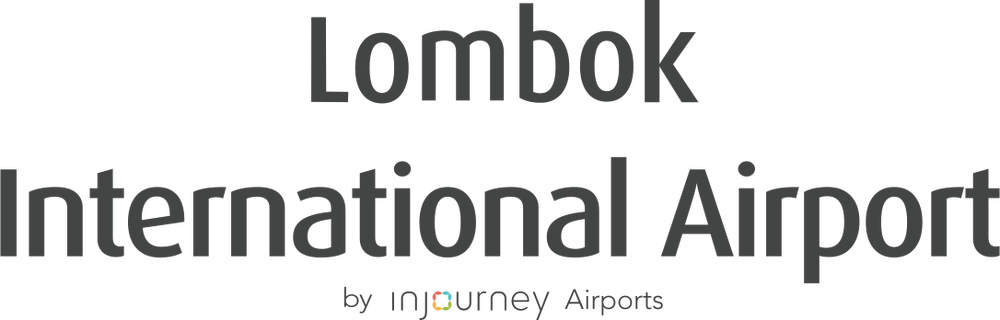

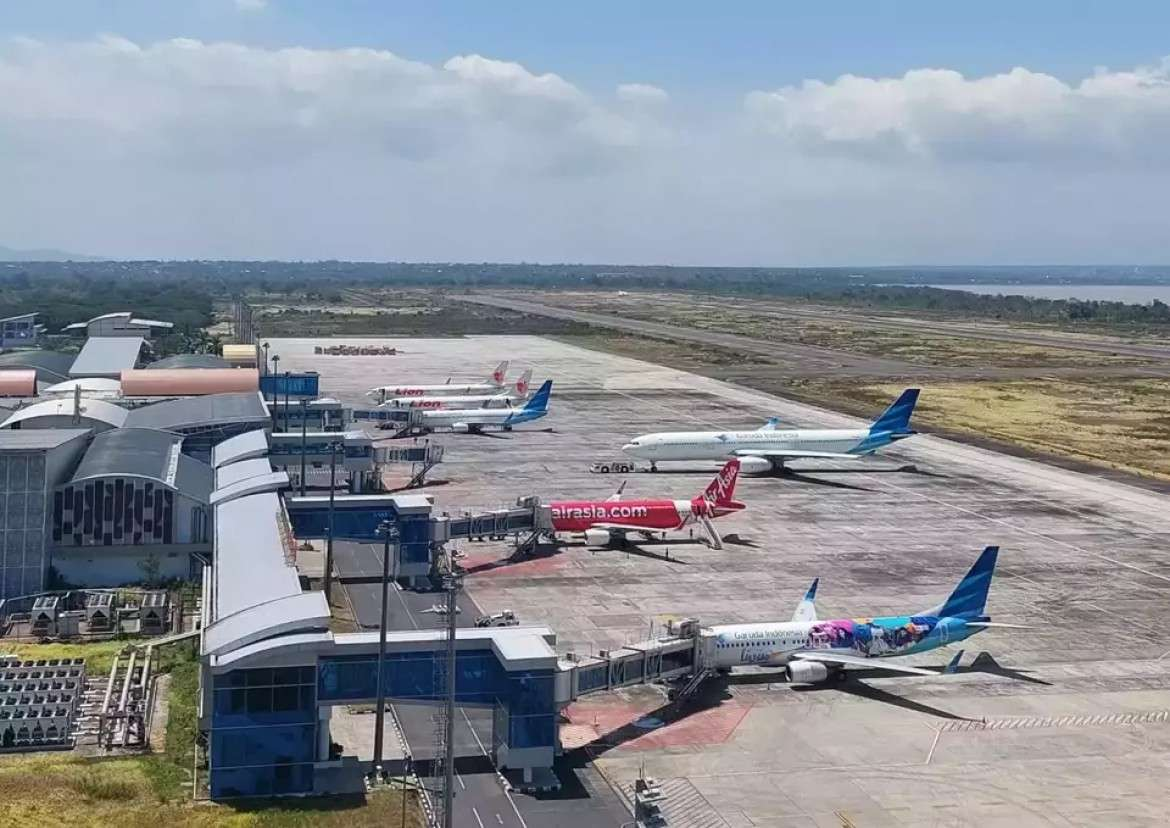
- IATA: LOP AMI (until 2011); ICAO: WADL; WMO: 97240

Summary
- Airport type: Public
- Owner: Government of Indonesia
- Operator: InJourney Airports
- Serves: Lombok
- Location: Central Lombok Regency, West Nusa Tenggara, Indonesia
- Opened: 20 October 2011; 15 years ago
- Time zone: WITA (UTC+08:00)
- Elevation AMSL: 97 m (318 ft)
- Coordinates: 08°45′29″S 116°16′35″E
- Website: www.lombok-airport.co.id

Maps
- Location in West Nusa Tenggara Province, Indonesia

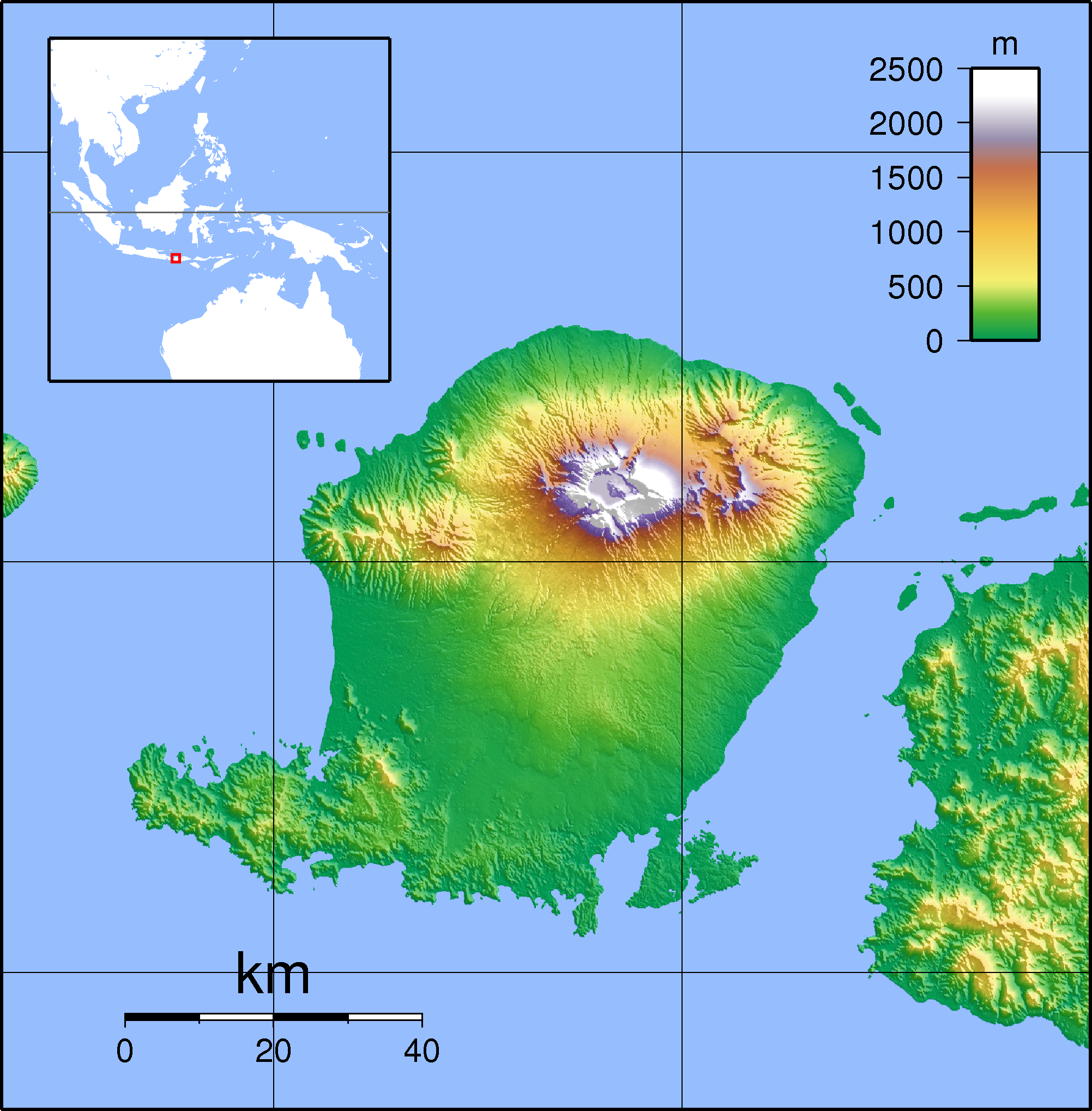
- Location of airport in Lombok LOP/WADL (Indonesia) LOP/WADL (Southeast Asia) LOP/WADL (Asia)

Runways
Direction	Length		Surface
Direction	m	ft	Surface
13/31	3,300	10,826	Asphalt

Statistics (2024)
- Passengers: 2,377,365 (▲1.8%)
- Cargo (tonnes): 13,003 (▼5.8%)
- Aircraft movements: 24,879 (▲7.2%)
- Source: DGCA

Lombok International Airport (IATA: LOP, ICAO: WADL) — also known as Zainuddin Abdul Madjid International Airport, Mataram or Praya— is an international airport serving the island of Lombok, part of West Nusa Tenggara province in Indonesia. The airport is situated in Tanak Awu, Central Lombok Regency, approximately 6 kilometers (3.7 miles) from Praya, the regency capital, and 27 kilometers (16.8 miles) from Mataram, the provincial capital and largest city in West Nusa Tenggara. It is the island's only fully operational airport and serves as one of the primary gateway to Lombok and its surrounding tourist destinations, including the Gili Islands, Mandalika, and Mount Rinjani. The airport is connected to several major cities in Indonesia, such as Jakarta, Denpasar, and Surabaya, and also offers international flights to Malaysia and Singapore. It replaced Selaparang Airport, the island's previous sole operational airport, in Ampenan on the west coast of Lombok near the capital of Mataram.

The airport is also the base of local flight training academy "LIFT" (Lombok Institute of Flight Technology) operating 3 Liberty XL2 training aircraft 6 days per week.

== History ==
=== Background ===
The first airfield in Lombok was Rambang Airfield, located in what is now East Lombok Regency. Built during the Dutch colonial era, it served as a refueling stop for flights en route to Australia. During the 1934 MacRobertson Air Race, Rambang Airfield was one of the designated stops for the competitors. Notably, New Zealand aviator Jean Batten, during her solo flight from the United Kingdom to Australia, also landed at Rambang Airfield as part of her historic journey. In his novel Beyond The Blue Horizon, British-Australian author Alexander Frater also recalled Rambang. He briefly mentioned it as one of the key airfields during the 1930s. Rambang's strategic location along the Singapore–Australia route made it an important stopover point for airlines such as Imperial Airways before reaching the Australian continent. In addition to Imperial Airways, the Dutch airline KLM also used Rambang as an international hub for its long-distance flights. In 1936, KLM launched the Batavia–Sydney route, with Rambang and Kupang serving as alternative transit points. The airbase was occupied by the Japanese during their World War II occupation of the Dutch East Indies and was actively used to support their military operations. After the war ended and amid the political turmoil of the 1950s following the Indonesian National Revolution, the airfield gradually fell into disuse.

The Indonesian government decided to build a new airfield in Ampenan, located in Mataram—the largest city and economic center of Lombok. Construction began in 1956 and was completed in 1959, with the airport officially inaugurated by President Sukarno. Initially named Rembiga Airport, it was renamed Selaparang Airport in 1994. However, by the early 21st century, Selaparang Airport was deemed too small to accommodate the increasing number of passengers and growing air traffic. Its single 2,100-meter runway could not be extended due to land constraints, preventing it from serving wide-body aircraft. Further expansion was also unfeasible due to the airport’s close proximity to densely populated urban areas. As a result, the decision was made to construct a new airport in Lombok.

=== Construction and inauguration ===
It was decided that the new airport would be built in Tanak Awu, Central Lombok Regency, approximately 40 kilometers from the previous Selaparang Airport. At the time of its construction, the airport terminal covered an area of 21,000 square meters and was designed to accommodate up to 3 million passengers annually. The funding was jointly provided by the airport operator Angkasa Pura I, the West Nusa Tenggara provincial government, and the Central Lombok Regency government. To facilitate the development, Angkasa Pura I acquired approximately 500 hectares of land, although the project faced resistance from local residents. Construction spanned six years, beginning in 2005 and completed in 2011.

The new facility was officially inaugurated by the president of Indonesia, Susilo Bambang Yudhoyono, on 20 October 2011. The airport can accommodate widebody high capacity Airbus A330, Boeing 747 and Boeing 777 airliners, in addition to the smaller aircraft such as the Boeing 737 and the Airbus A320 family already serving Lombok. The first aircraft that landed on the airport was a Garuda Indonesia Boeing 737-800NG, marking the commencement of operations on 1 October 2011. The airport was built on a land area of about 551.8 hectares. Lombok International Airport has the second largest area after Soekarno–Hatta International Airport at the time of the opening of the airport.

In the early phase of its operation, the airport encountered several challenges, including the presence of local residents and street vendors within the terminal area. This situation led to perceptions of the facility resembling a marketplace, contributing to concerns about cleanliness, orderliness, and overall visual appeal.

=== Contemporary history ===
In 2018, the airport was renamed Zainuddin Abdul Madjid International Airport in honor of Muhammad Zainuddin Abdul Madjid, an esteemed Islamic scholar from Lombok and the founder of Nahdlatul Wathan, a prominent Islamic organization in the province. However, the renaming was considered controversial and faced opposition from many residents of Central Lombok Regency, who argued that it was politically motivated and reflected the identity of a specific group rather than representing the broader population of Lombok. Despite the official renaming, many people continue to refer to the airport as Lombok International Airport

To accommodate the growing number of Australian tourists visiting Lombok, the first direct route to Australia was launched in 2019, connecting Lombok with Perth. The service was operated by Indonesia AirAsia. At the time, Indonesia AirAsia announced plans to establish the airport as one of its hubs, positioning it as an alternative to the overcrowded I Gusti Ngurah Rai International Airport in Bali. The airline also planned to launch new routes from Lombok to destinations in Eastern Indonesia, including Labuan Bajo. However, the Lombok–Perth route was suspended in 2020 due to the COVID-19 pandemic and has not been resumed since. There have been proposals to resume flight routes to Australia, as well as to establish new international connections to Thailand and China. There are also plans to establish direct flights to Jeddah, Saudi Arabia, to accommodate pilgrims traveling to Mecca for Hajj and Umrah.

A major expansion of the airport was completed in 2022 in preparation for the 2022 MotoGP event held at the Mandalika International Street Circuit. The expansion included the enlargement of the passenger terminal, extension of the runway, and upgrades to various airside and landside facilities.

In January 2026, it is announced that TransNusa will launch an international flight to Darwin, Australia and the route was scheduled to be operate in late February.

== Facilities and development ==
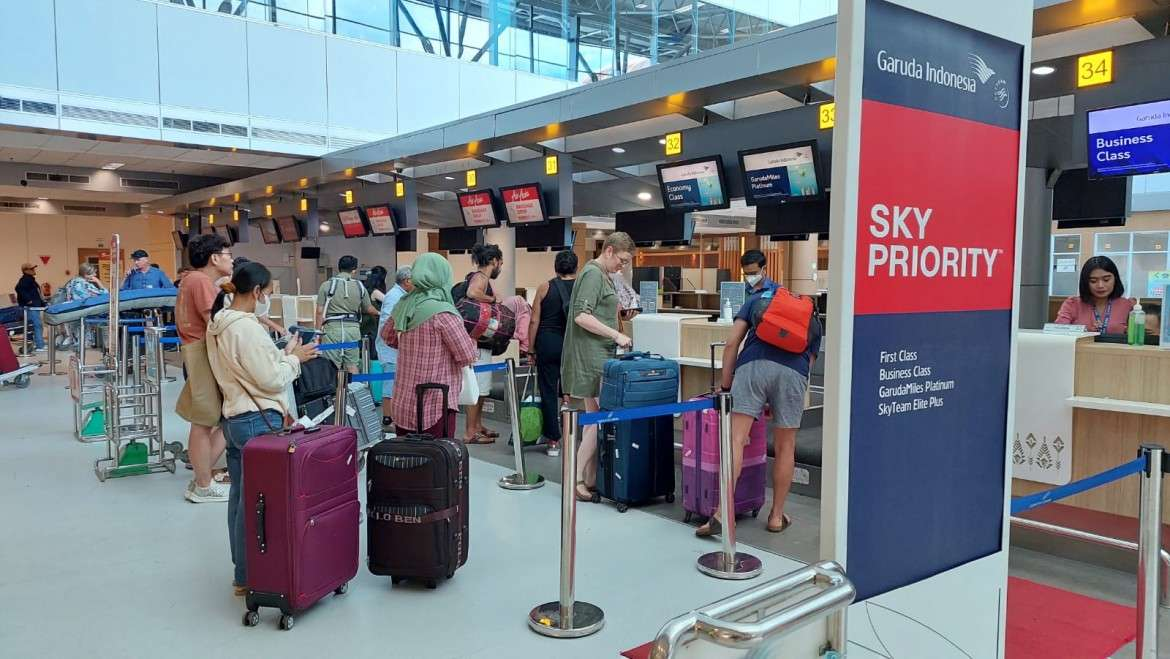
Check-in area

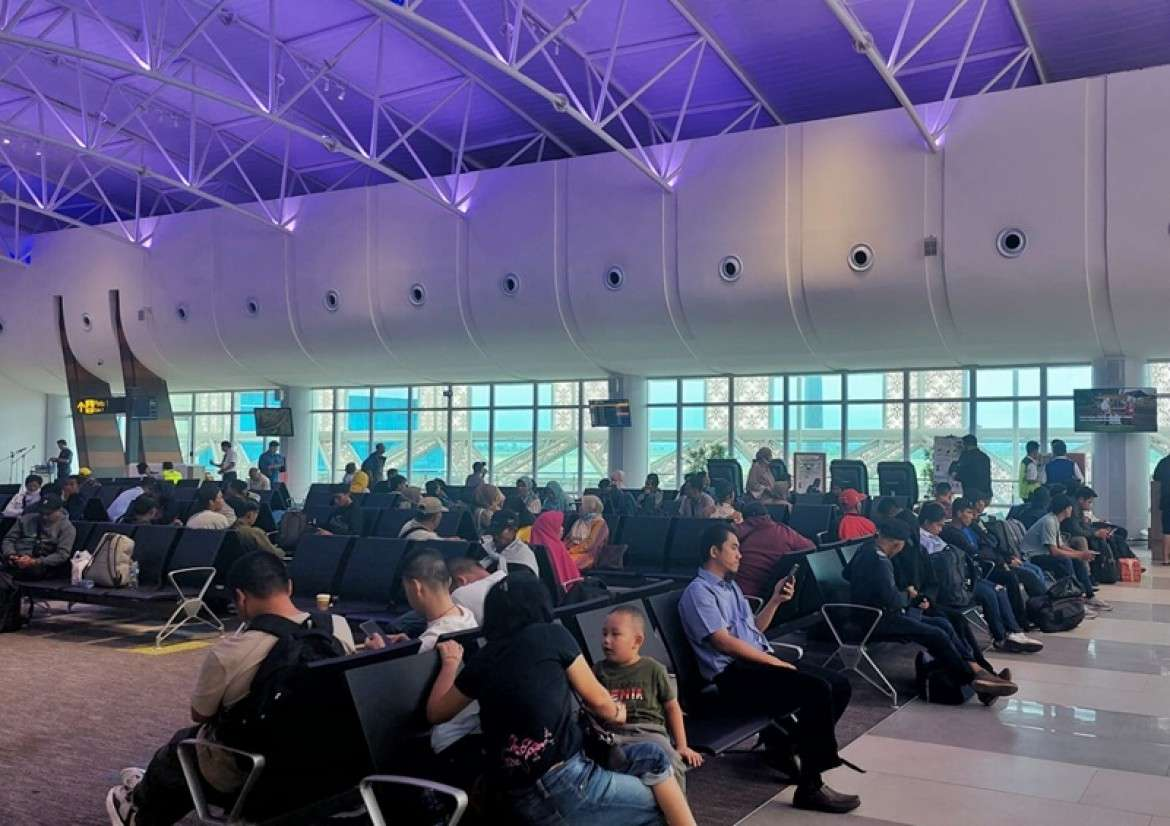
Boarding gate

When it began operations in 2011, Lombok International Airport initially had a runway measuring 2,750 meters by 40 meters, enabling it to accommodate wide-body aircraft such as the Airbus A330 and Boeing 767. At the time, the apron had the capacity to handle up to 10 aircraft. The passenger terminal at Lombok International Airport covers approximately 21,000 square meters. The terminal has a designed capacity of up to three million passengers annually and is supported by a parking area spanning 17,500 square meters.

Following a major expansion between 2021 and 2022 in preparation for the 2022 MotoGP event held in Lombok, the passenger terminal at Lombok International Airport was enlarged to 43,501 square meters, increasing its capacity to 7 million passengers per year from the previous 24,123 square meters and 3.25 million passengers. The terminal currently features 46 check-in counters and 7 boarding gates, five of which are equipped with jet bridges. In addition, the apron was expanded to 136,300 square meters from its original size of just 108,100 square meters. With a total area of 136,300 square meters, the apron can accommodate up to 16 aircraft, consisting of 10 narrow-body aircraft and 6 wide-body aircraft. The runway has been extended from 2,750 meters to 3,300 meters, enabling it to support wide-body aircraft such as the Boeing 777. Additionally, a new parallel taxiway measuring 865 meters by 23 meters was constructed. Further developments included enhancements to cargo facilities, the construction of a waving gallery, and expansion of passenger parking. Cargo facility improvements comprised the construction of a 1,500-meter cargo access road and the expansion of the cargo apron from 3,566 to 6,000 square meters. In total, the investment for the airport expansion and the development of related infrastructure amounted to approximately 752 billion rupiah.

In 2024, the airport’s waiting lounges were expanded to support MotoGP's 2024 Indonesian motorcycle Grand Prix. Following the upgrade, the domestic lounge now has a capacity of 1,600 seats, while the international lounge accommodates 1,200 seats.

The Government of West Nusa Tenggara is planning to transform the area surrounding Lombok International Airport into an aerocity. To support this development, various supporting infrastructure projects have been undertaken, including the construction of asphalt roads and tourist resorts in the southern part of the airport area. In addition, the aerocity will be equipped with a range of facilities, such as a shopping center, a hotel, and other airport-related services. As of 2021, Angkasa Pura I was still seeking potential investors to develop the aerocity, a key pillar of the airport’s future development. This initiative forms part of the company’s long-term strategy to support rising tourist arrivals in Lombok and to transform Lombok International Airport into a world-class hub. Central to this effort is the development of the aerocity concept, which, alongside improvements in facilities and service quality, is expected to drive sustainable growth in non-aeronautical revenue.

== Airlines and destinations ==
=== Passenger ===
Airlines	Destinations
AirAsia	Kuala Lumpur–International
Batik Air	Jakarta–Soekarno-Hatta
Batik Air Malaysia	Kuala Lumpur–International
Citilink	Jakarta–Soekarno-Hatta, Surabaya
Garuda Indonesia	Jakarta–Soekarno-Hatta
Indonesia AirAsia	Kuala Lumpur–International
Lion Air	Jakarta–Soekarno-Hatta, Kuala Lumpur–International, Makassar, Surabaya; Seasonal: Denpasar
Pelita Air	Jakarta–Soekarno-Hatta
Scoot	Singapore
Super Air Jet	Balikpapan, Jakarta–Soekarno-Hatta, Surabaya, Yogyakarta–International
TransNusa	Denpasar, Jakarta–Soekarno-Hatta
Wings Air	Banyuwangi, Bima, Denpasar, Labuan Bajo, Sumbawa Besar, Waingapu

== Statistics ==
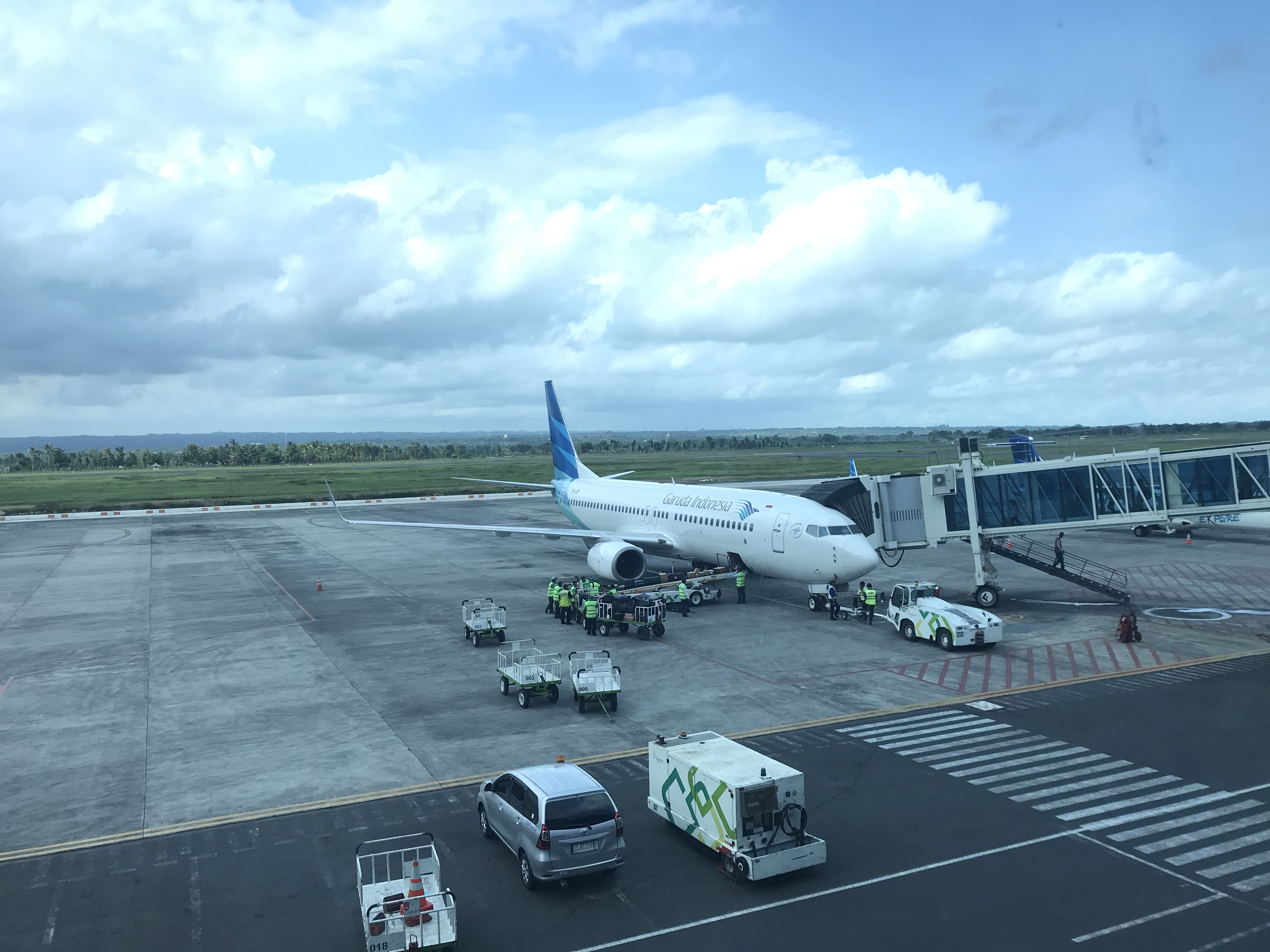
Garuda Indonesia aircraft parked at Lombok International Airport

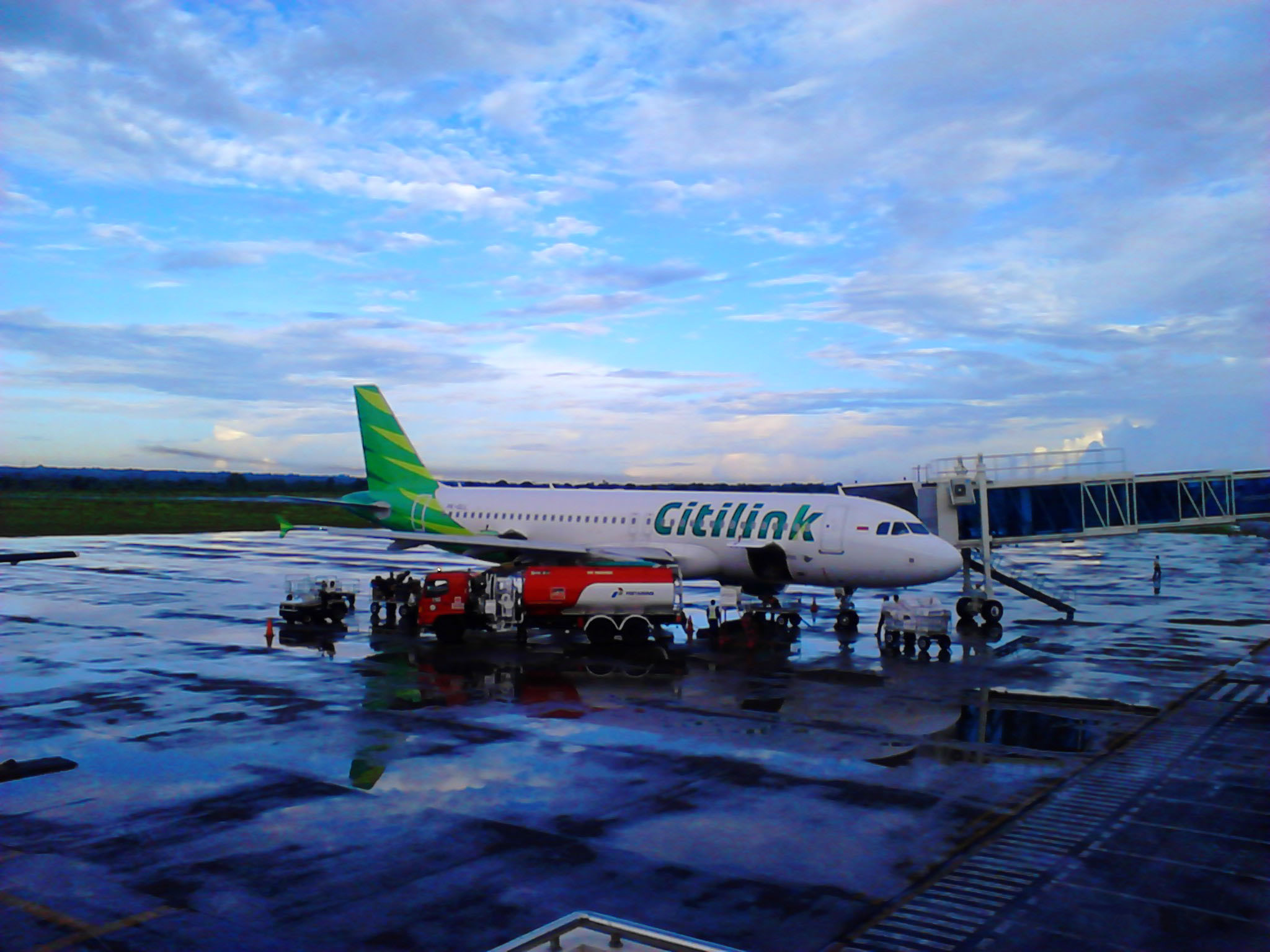
Citilink Airbus A320 parked at Lombok International Airport

Annual passenger numbers and aircraft statistics
Year	Passengers handled	Passenger % change	Cargo (tonnes)	Cargo % change	Aircraft movements	Aircraft % change
2006	905,556	Steady	4,354	Steady	16,207	Steady
2007	933,958	▲3.1	3,841	▼11.8	15,334	▼5.4
2008	1,049,395	▲12.4	5,719	▲48.9	17,194	▲12.1
2009	1,173,913	▲11.9	5,029	▼12.1	17,881	▲4.0
2010	1,406,031	▲19.8	6,626	▲31.8	19,226	▲7.5
2011	1,676,921	▲19.3	6,557	▼1.0	24,091	▲25.3
2012	1,836,152	▲9.5	6,580	▲0.4	27,703	▲15.0
2013	2,167,619	▲18.1	6,886	▲4.7	31,432	▲13.5
2014	2,417,875	▲11.5	7,821	▲13.6	30,655	▼2.5
2015	2,552,400	▲5.6	8,720	▲11.5	25,227	▼17.7
2016	3,421,584	▲34.1	11,997	▲37.6	32,804	▲30.0
2017	3,589,812	▲4.9	13,943	▲16.2	33,882	▲3.3
2018	3,594,324	▲0.1	17,217	▲23.5	36,129	▲6.6
2019	2,900,203	▼19.3	9,389	▼45.5	27,859	▼22.9
2020	1,286,608	▼55.6	3,933	▼58.1	15,626	▼43.9
2021	1,077,004	▼16.3	8,224	▲109.1	12,686	▼18.8
2022	1,979,769	▲83.8	10,754	▲30.8	20,654	▲62.8
2023	2,334,364	▲17.9	13,806	▲28.4	23,218	▲12.4
2004	2,377,365	▲1.8	13,003	▼5.8	24,879	▲7.2
^{Source: DGCA, BPS}

Notes: Data prior to 2011 are derived from records of Selaparang Airport.

== Ground transportation ==
=== Car and bus parking ===
The airport has extensive paved parking areas at the main terminal and smaller facilities for the cargo terminal and administrative areas. Entrance is by a single controlled access point to the nearby highway.

=== Public bus services ===
Perum DAMRI provide a public airport shuttle service to Terminal Mandalika ('city bus terminal') on the eastern outskirts of Mataram and on to the west coast at Senggigi. The public bus service uses a dedicated fleet of modern air-conditioned buses and provides a scheduled service for set fees.

=== Taxi services ===
When the airport services were moved across from the previous facilities at Selaparang the Airport Taksi Koperasi moved operations to BIL. Upon the commencement of services from BIL they ceased to provide a set distance pre-paid docket system and adopted a metered ('argometer') method of charging for distance traveled. The airport taxi service is supplemented by metered taxis provided by the two established operators: Bluebird Taxi and Express Taxi.

== Accidents and incidents ==
- On 29 September 2020, Lion Air Flight 177, operating a Boeing 737-900ER on the Lombok–Surabaya route, experienced an engine issue shortly after takeoff from Lombok International Airport. The aircraft returned to the airport as a precautionary measure. All 114 passengers on board were unharmed.
