= Selaparang Airport =

Former airport of Lombok, West Nusa Tenggara, Indonesia

Selaparang Airport Bandar Udara Selaparang
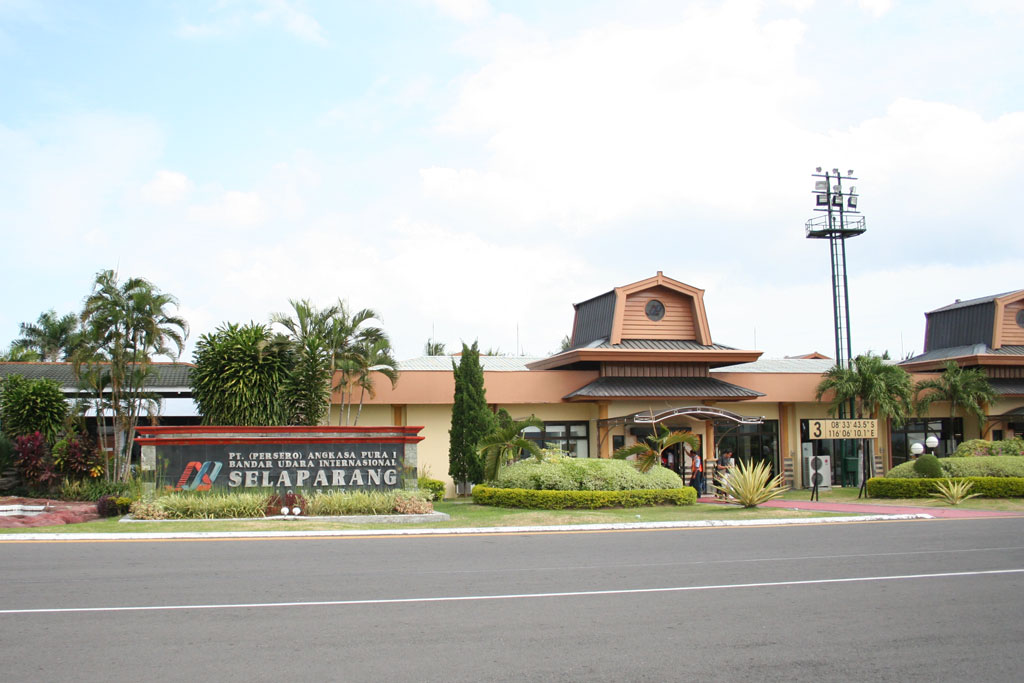
- IATA: none; ICAO: WADA

Summary
- Airport type: Defunct
- Operator: PT Angkasa Pura I
- Serves: Mataram, Lombok
- Location: Ampenan
- Closed: 30 September 2011
- Elevation AMSL: 52 ft / 17.3 m
- Coordinates: 08°33′38″S 116°05′39″E
- Website: www.angkasapura1.co.id

Map
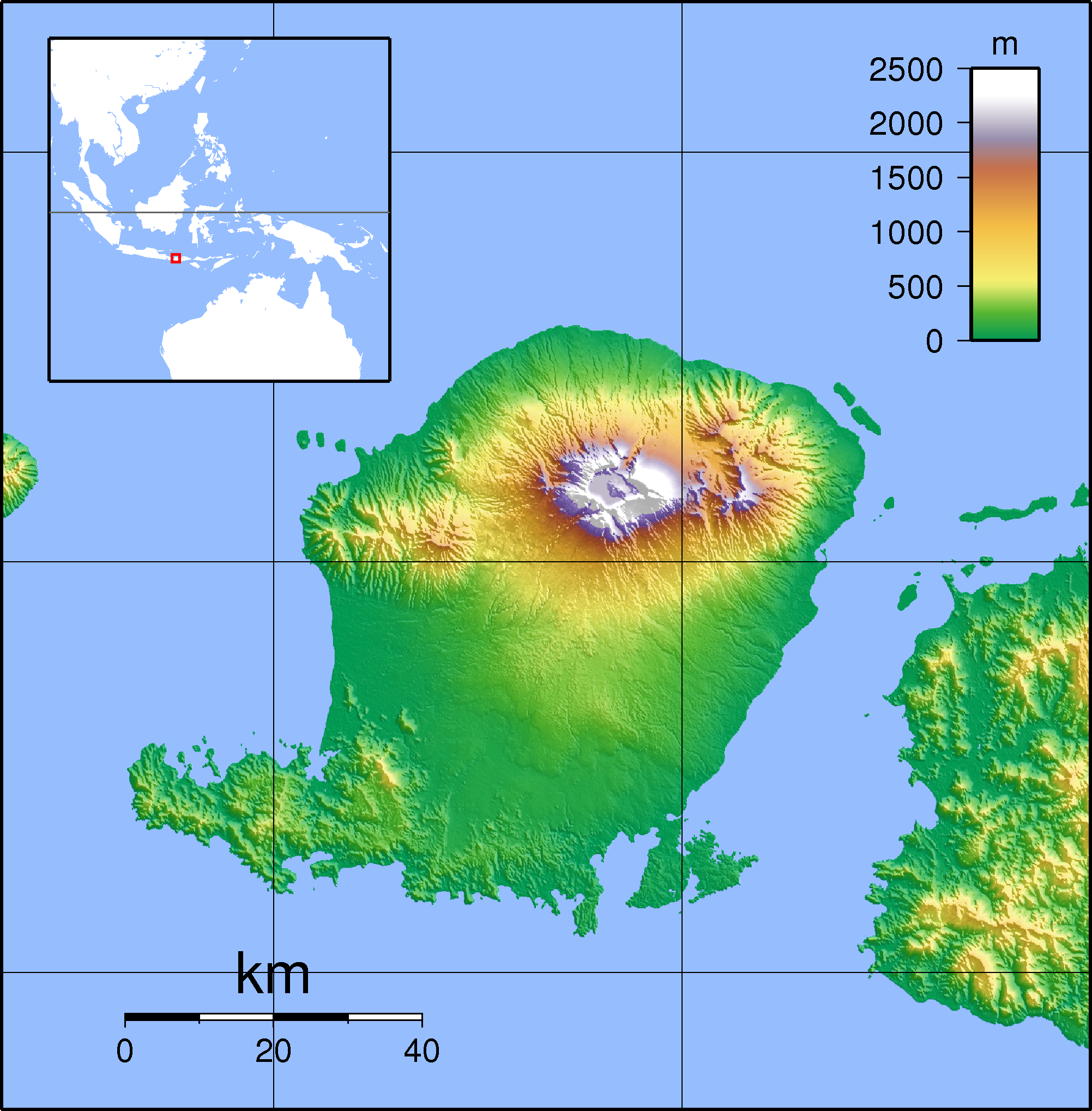
- Location of airport in Lombok

Runways
Direction	Length		Surface
Direction	ft	m	Surface
09/27	6,857	2,100	Asphalt

Statistics
- Dimension: 2100 x 40 m
- PCN: 30 / F / C / X / T
- Apron area: 28 181 m2
- Air navigation: NDB, DVOR, DME
- Airport classification-Class II; Closed to airline operations on 30 September 2011 at 18:00 Boeing 737, Airbus A319, A320, MD90, Fokker F100

Selaparang Airport (ICAO: WADA) was an airport that served the island of Lombok and the city of Mataram, the capital of the province of West Nusa Tenggara, Indonesia until its closure on 30 September 2011. The IATA code AMI came from the nearby port of Ampenan, now a part of Mataram. The airport was operated by PT. Angkasa Pura 1 (PERSERO). The new Lombok International Airport operated under the IATA code AMI until late November 2011, toward the end of the month the IATA code LOP was formally listed for the new airport and was slowly being transitioned by the airlines operating to Lombok. The IATA code AMI is no longer associated with Selaparang Airport and has been reassigned to Ambala Airport in Haryana, India.

Selaparang Airport was closed on 30 September 2011 to facilitate transfer of resources and operations to the new Lombok International Airport (Bandara Internasional Lombok - BIL) (IATA: LOP, ICAO: WADL) in Central Lombok Regency.

== International gateway facilities ==
- Customs & Excise: no longer available
- Immigration: no longer available
- Quarantine; Health, Animals, Plants & Fish: no longer available

=== Departure tax ===
Indonesian airports frequently levy taxes upon departing passengers. Passengers departing Lombok's Selaparang Airport were subject to a departure tax of Rp 75,000 for international departures and Rp 30.000 for domestic departures.

== Facilities ==
=== General services ===
- ATM: no longer available
- Money Changer: no longer available
- Post Office: on main road opposite airport
- Public Telephone

=== Airport taxi services ===
Taxi Mataram (Airport Taksi) operated from the airport until 30 September 2011. They had an exclusive contract to provide taxi services to arriving passengers at Selaparang Airport. Arriving passengers purchased taxi coupons at dedicated airport taxi service counters at both the domestic and the international terminals. The island's other taxi operators were only able to drop off passengers inside the airport and could not pick up passengers within the airport grounds. Prices were set by destination/zone with Lombok comprising 22 price zones. The last zone and pricing adjustment was issued by West Nusa Tenggara government decree in 2009.

=== Vehicle parking ===
- Area : 7334 m2
- Capacity : 316 sedan / motorbikes / buses

Private vehicles including cars, shuttle buses, buses and motorbikes had access the airport's public parking area and terminal drop off zones. Public access to the parking area is by a dedicated roadway entered through the main terminal gate from both eastbound and westbound roadways of the nearby Jalan Adi Sucipto which runs parallel to the airports single runway. The airport operators charged an entrance fee for all vehicles entering the airport including taxis, cars, buses and motorbikes until the official closure of the airport.

=== Security facilities ===
- Baggage X-Ray: no longer available
- Walk through metal detector: no longer available
- Explosive detector: no longer available
- Hand-wand metal detector: no longer available

=== Fuel supplies ===
- Jet A1, without icing inhibitor.

=== Meteorological services ===
- Observation: ADA: unknown refer to Bandara Internasional Lombok WADL
- Forecast: ADA: unknown refer to Bandara Internasional Lombok WADL

=== Power supply ===
- Grid power : PLN : 10 385 KVA
- On-site genset : 9100 KVA: serviceability unknown

=== Airport classification ===
- Class IIA
- Runway dimensions

Length: 2100 m
Width: 40 m

Aircraft types

- Narrow body passenger aircraft

Boeing 737
Airbus A319, A320
Fokker F100

- Apron Area : 28 181 m2
- Parking position stands

Narrow body Alt.1 : 8 aircraft
Narrow body Alt.2 : 7 aircraft
Narrow body Alt.3 : 0 aircraft

=== Taxiway ===
- Area total size : 4830 m2
- Taxiway A:Exit T / W, 105m x 23m, PCN: 24 / f / C / x / T
- Taxiway B:Exit T / W, 105m x 23m, PCN: 30 / f / C / x / T

=== PKP-PK ===
All the mobile facilities were removed to Bandara Internasional Lombok WADL at the time of cessation of operations at Selaparang. The resources listed below were those that previously served the operational airport until 30 September 2011.

- CAT-VI:
- Total fleet : 7 unit. Configuration: Foam Tender 3 unit: no longer available
- Nurse tender : 1 unit: no longer available
- Rescue tender : 2 unit: no longer available
- Command car : 1 unit: no longer available
- Ambulance : 2 units: no longer available
- Rescue Boat : Not Available
- Salvage : Not Available

=== Airfield lighting ===
- Approach Light Runway Light: operational status unknown
- PAPI, REILSt: operational status unknown
- Taxiway Light: operational status unknown
- Flood Light Apront: operational status unknown
- Rotating Beacon, Signal Areast: operational status unknown

=== Flight telecommunications ===
All demountable facilities were removed to Bandara Internasional Lombok at the time of cessation of operations at Selaparang. The resources listed below were those that previously served the operational airport until D\30 September 2011.

- HF / VHF, HF SSB, VSATt: operational status unknown
- ADCt: operational status unknown
- AMSC, RECORDING SYSTEM, facsimile, HT, MOBILE RADIOt: operational status unknown

=== Terminal statistics ===
- International passenger terminal
- Area: 1600 m2
- Capacity 47 000 pax per year
- Domestic passenger terminal
- Area: 3196 m2
- Capacity 285 000 pax per year
- Cargo Terminal
- Area: 420 m2

Specifications provided may be subject to change

== Future uses of the Selaparang airport ==
=== Reactivation ===
In February 2012, PT Angkasa Pura I (PT AP I) has signed a Memorandum of Understanding with Merukh Enterprise for utilizing the airport as aircraft maintenance area. PT AP I has also agreed some area of the airport is used as Lombok Institute Flying Technology (LIFT) which 51 percent stake is kept by domestic investor and the rest is kept by Castel Mark Limited, Hong Kong. The airport definitely closed for regular flights, but opens for charter flights.

=== Proposed development as a Regional Aviation Hub ===
The future use of Selaparang Airport to develop a General Aviation Hub for Indonesia may offer considerable opportunities for Indonesia's tourism triangle of Bali, Lombok and Sumbawa. Currently national law restricts the development of General Aviation in Indonesia due to national laws preventing other than Indonesian registered pilots to operate inside Indonesian airspace without a suitably qualified Indonesian pilot present in the cockpit.
