= Seko, Indonesia =

Seko
- District
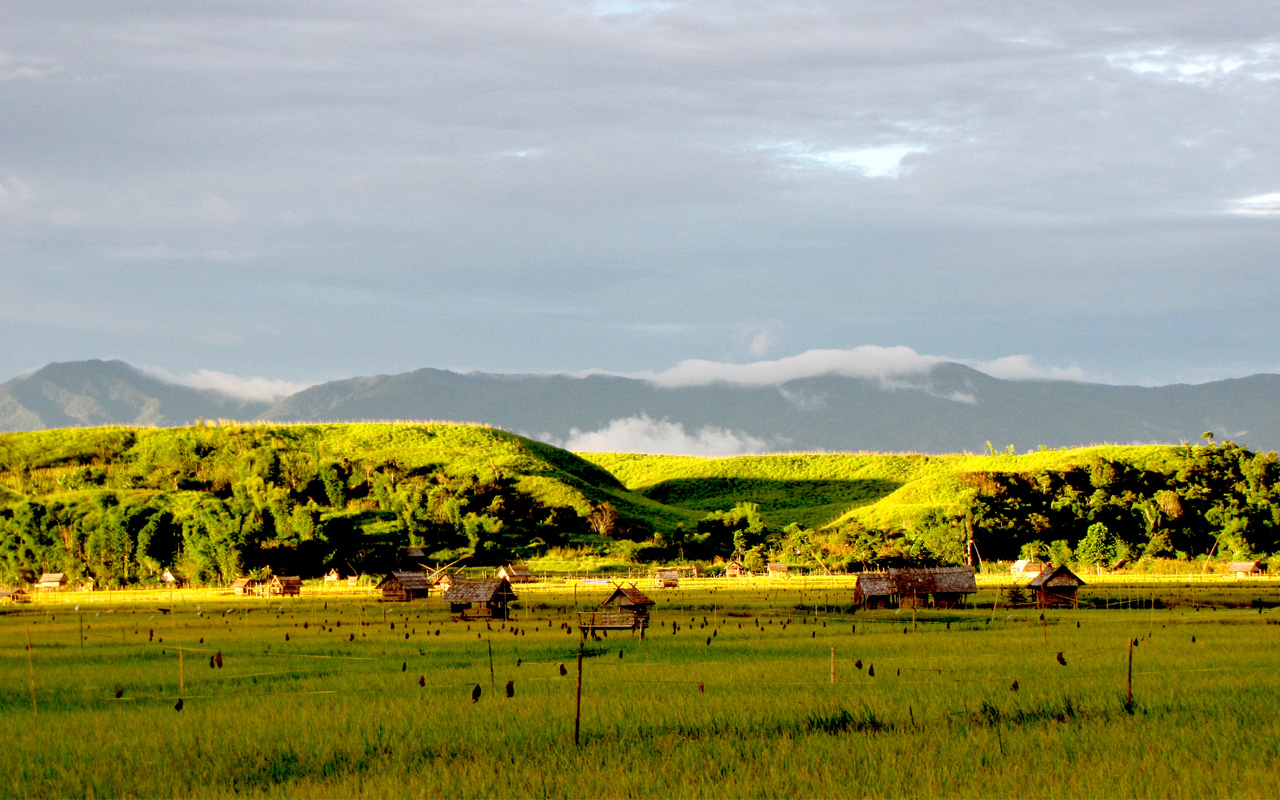
- Rice fields in Seko

- Location of Seko in Sulawesi
- Coordinates: 2°16′S 119°53′E
- Country: Indonesia
- Province: South Sulawesi
- Regency: North Luwu Regency

Area
  - Total: 2,109.2 km^{2} (814.4 sq mi)

Population (2020)
  - Total: 12,997
  - Density: 6.1621/km^{2} (15.960/sq mi)
- Time zone: UTC+8 (Central Indonesia Time)

Seko is a district of North Luwu Regency, South Sulawesi, Indonesia. A mountainous district with a population of 13,000 people, it is a relatively isolated region from the rest of the regency and province.

== Geography ==
Seko is located roughly at the geographical center of Sulawesi, approximately 600 km away from the provincial capital of Makassar and 140 km from the regency seat at Masamba. It is located to the north of the regency, bordering the provinces of West Sulawesi and Central Sulawesi. The district's topography is mountainous with stretches of savanna land. The rivers of Betue, Kasumong, and Oro flow through the district, the rivers merging to form the Karama River. The region has an elevation of about 1,000 meters. With an area of over 2,100 square kilometers, it is the largest district in North Luwu Regency.

== History ==
A number of stone structures, carvings and artefacts have been found in Seko, estimated to indicate human habitation from at least the 15th century. Earthen mounds and burial sites are also found across the district. Seko contained iron ore mines, one of the few in premodern Indonesia to be easily accessible, and gold was also panned in the rivers, resulting in the region's integration with an ancient trade network. At some point, it was conquered by the Luwu Kingdom, whose ruler assigned the region its current name.

== Administration ==
Seko is subdivided into twelve villages, listed below. The district office is located in the village of Padang Balua.

Village	Area	Population
Tirobali	88.82	896
Malimongan	86.66	955
Beroppa	92.97	742
Tanama Kaleang	100.20	1,781
Embonatanah	276.06	1,515
Lodang	286.51	1,138
Padang Raya	316.88	801
Padang Balua	295.26	1,375
Taloto	128.93	1,026
Marante	198.00	1,067
Hono	149.35	903
Hoyane	89.56	799

== Culture ==
Aside from the administrative division, the broader Seko area is traditionally divided into three traditional regions: Seko Padang, Seko Tengah, and Seko Lemo, and local tradition further divided these regions into nine customary areas. The Seko Padang area is drained by the Betue and Kasumong rivers, whilst the Seko Tengah area comprises the lower Betue river after Kasumong's confluence and the Seko Lemo area is drained by the Oro river. The region is home to the Seko languages, a native language group with around 9,000 speakers in the 1980s.

== Transport ==
Seko is connected to Masamba by a partially (as of 2020) paved road, which reached Seko in early 2020. The trip from Masamba to Seko takes around 5 hours. Prior to the road's opening, Seko was largely isolated from land routes, requiring offroad motorbike taxis to reach which were reported as "the most expensive motorcycle taxi in Indonesia".

The Seko Airport serves the district with pioneer flights to Masamba, Palu, Toraja, and Ampana.

== Economy ==
With the recent opening of the road to Masamba, Seko has been electrified, with its economy based around agriculture with products including rice, cocoa, and coffee. Rice farms are mostly wetland paddy fields, covering over 4,200 hectares, with around 450 hectares being planted with coffee and another 750 hectares with cocoa. There are plans for the development of a mine, plantations and a hydroelectric power plant, which has faced significant opposition from locals and environmental groups.
