= Aviastar Flight 7503 =

2015 aviation accident

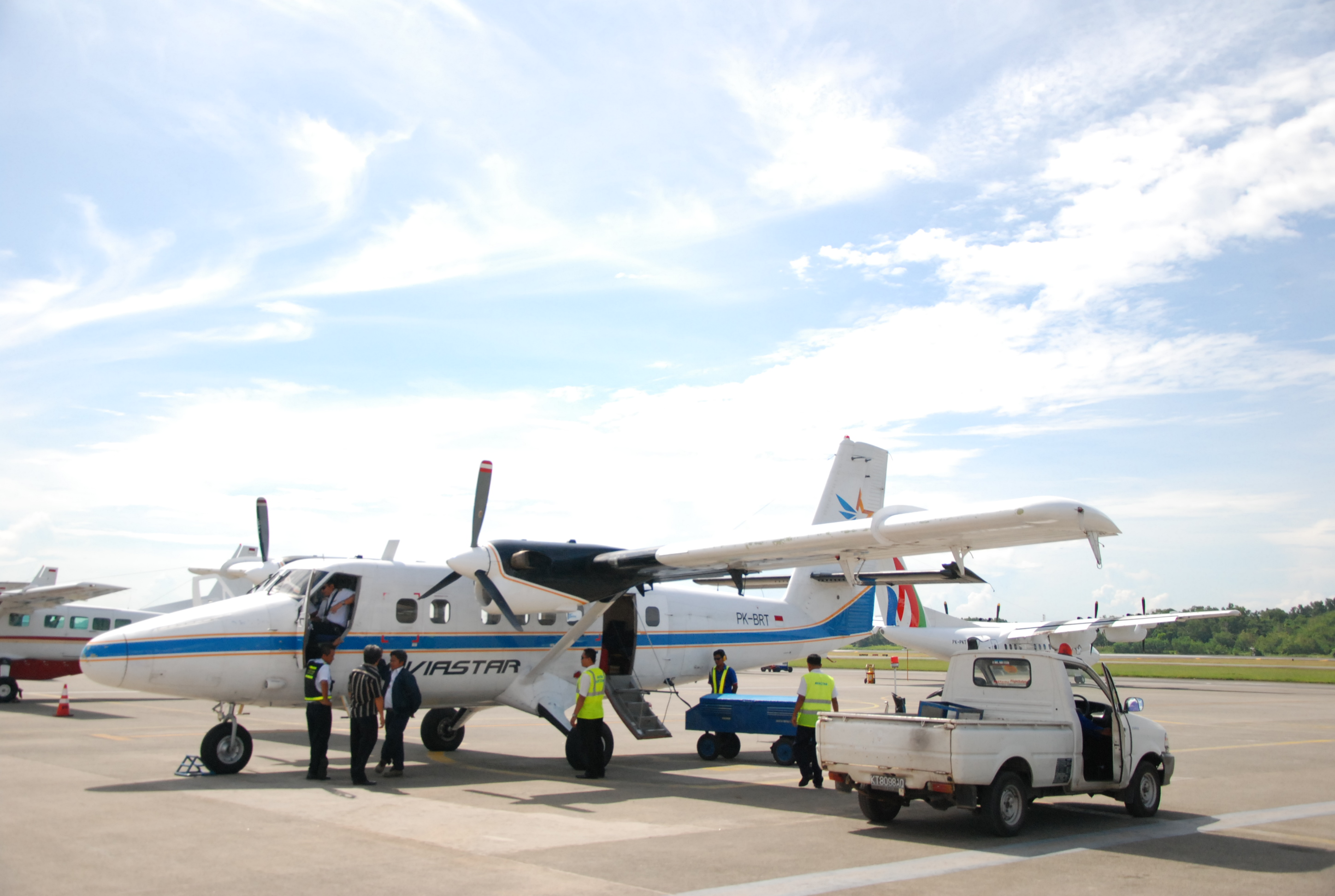
- An Aviastar DHC-6 similar to the aircraft involved in the accident

Accident
- Date: 2 October 2015
- Summary: Controlled flight into terrain due to pilot error
- Site: Mount Latimojong, Luwu Regency, Indonesia; 3°25′53″S 120°4′12″E

Aircraft
- Aircraft type: de Havilland Canada DHC-6 Twin Otter
- Operator: Aviastar
- IATA flight No.: MV7503
- ICAO flight No.: VIT7503
- Call sign: AVIASTAR 7503
- Registration: PK-BRM
- Flight origin: Andi Jemma Airport, Masamba, Indonesia
- Destination: Sultan Hasanuddin International Airport, Makassar, Indonesia
- Occupants: 10
- Passengers: 7
- Crew: 3
- Fatalities: 10
- Survivors: 0

Aviastar Flight 7503 was a regional flight from Masamba to Makassar, Indonesia. On 2 October 2015, the de Havilland Canada DHC-6 Twin Otter aircraft serving the route went missing with 10 on board near Palopo minutes after takeoff. There was no distress call from the plane.

After an extensive search operation, three days later the plane was found crashed and it was confirmed that all 10 on board were dead. It was Aviastar's deadliest crash.

National Transportation Safety Committee released the final report in January 2017 and concluded that the crash was caused by pilot error. They found out that both pilots agreed to deviate the plane from its designated route and decided to "take a shortcut", and thus cutting the travel time of the airplane. However, by doing so, the plane would have had to pass the mountains on the middle of the route. This would not have happened if they stayed at their designated track which was near the shoreline. The report also noted the absence of warning of the ground proximity warning system (EGPWS).

Aviastar was temporarily suspended by the Indonesian government following the crash and all its entire fleet was grounded, but the airline resumed limited operations afterwards. However, as of 2024, the airline has been declared no longer operating since 2022 after its website was closed by that year.

== Flight ==
The aircraft took off from Masamba Airport at 14:25 WITA (06:25 UTC) with 3 crew and 7 passengers on board. It was expected to land in Makassar one hour later at 15:25, but eleven minutes after take-off, the plane lost contact with the control tower. At the time of the loss, the aircraft was on an elevation of 8,000 ft. According to local reports, the weather was cited as excellent, with visibility above 100 km and winds at 5 knots. The route which was chosen in this flight was a "very safe" route with elevation ranging around 10–100 ft, meaning that there are no mountains or large hills in the route. The communication between the flight crews and the air traffic controller at the time was also reported as very good. The fuel on board was sufficient for the flight, and according to Aviastar, the aircraft was determined to be in very good condition. This was backed up by evidence from KNKT (National Transportation Safety Committee).

== Search ==
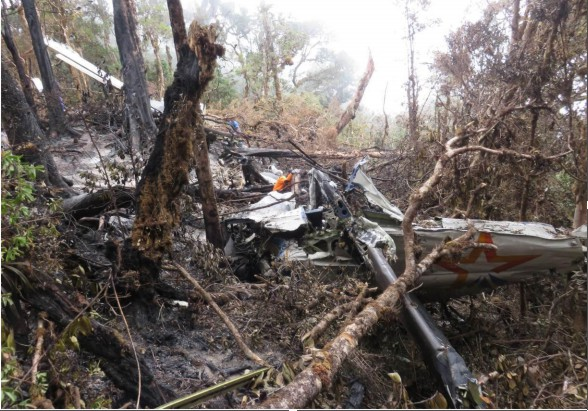
Wreckage

Immediately after the crash, the Indonesian National Search and Rescue Agency (BASARNAS) set up a crisis centre in Makassar. They also sent 100 search and rescue personnel to the area. The first day of the search was by foot. The plane had not yet been located at that time. As nightfall approached, the search was suspended, even though citizens in the regency of Palopo claimed that they saw a "very low" flying plane in the area. These reports were later confirmed to be hoaxes.

On the second day, search and rescue personnel from Masamba and Makassar searched the same area with one helicopter and three aircraft from Aviastar. The search area was widened, from Palopo and the surrounding areas to Luwu shoreline. In a press conference, BASARNAS reported that the position of the missing plane was around 14 nautical square miles. It had officially widened to 24 nautical square miles, which would take around 2.5 hours by land from the nearest city. There were three coordinates which BASARNAS suspected to be the crash site, which is at 14 nautical miles, 24 nautical miles and 34 nautical miles. The aircraft was finally located by the signal from the engineer's cellphone, which was set in Airplane Mode. The search operation was hampered due to poor weather condition in the area. At early dusk, some people reported that the plane was found in the area of Sidrap. The claim was later investigated.

BASARNAS sent around 125 personnel on the second day of the search operations, with National Armed Forces assistance. Head of BASARNAS, Bambang Soelistyo, said in a press conference that his personnel along with the National Armed Forces and some other personnel from Luwu had scoured four main areas, in Luwu regency, Northern Luwu regency and Palopo Regency.

On the third day of the incident search BASARNAS added aircraft. They also added additional personnel from 125 to 299 persons. The Vice Governor of South Sulawesi, Agus Arifin Nu'mang joined the search for the flight from the ground. As the search widened, assistance from various government organizations also arrived, including BPBD, Indonesian Red Cross and the IRC. Relatives of the passengers were also joining the search, hoping for survivors.

=== Eyewitnesses ===
Numerous people claimed that they saw the plane crash, but all of them gave different locations. Some people claimed that the plane crashed into Palopo Mountains, while others claimed that the plane crashed near Sidrap waterfall. A young student claimed that the plane was flying very low, and had smoke on the wing, then impacted the sea at the Luwu shoreline. Some villagers also stated that the plane flew into the Barru and Pare-Pare sea. BASARNAS stated that there are possibilities that the plane flew off course, using a different route, and flew over the shoreline due to the mountains in the west. As a result, the search area was widened as far as the Makassar Strait.

== Recovery ==
On the fourth day, the search area was officially widened into the sea. In the afternoon, at 15:55 WITA, some personnel of BASARNAS and the Indonesian police found debris on Latimojong Mountain. BASARNAS later confirmed that the debris belonged to the missing aircraft. Photos taken by BASARNAS shown that the wreckage of the aircraft was burning even days after the disappearance. At the time of the discovery, there were three burned bodies in the area. No survivors were found.

On 6 October, the black boxes were recovered as well as the bodies. The black boxes were found in a good condition. BASARNAS took the bodies to a military hospital in Makassar. President Joko Widodo observed the recovery. There were 22 DVI personnel which will help the identification of the victims.

National Transportation Safety Committee stated that the wreckage of the plane could not be located for days because the ELT (Emergency Locator Transmitter) antenna detached during its impact with terrain. The aircraft was equipped with an ELT, however Search and Rescue Agency could not locate the wreckage for days. Observation on the crash site revealed that the aircraft hit several tree tops and resulted in a clean cut on the trees. These typical of clean cut were caused by a high speed impact with the cuts on the trees noted to be level indicating that the aircraft was in straight and level flight.

== Passengers and crew ==
All on board the aircraft were Indonesians. There were seven adults, one child and two infants. Among the passengers were the head of Seko Airport in Northern Luwu and five Andi Djemma Airport staff. One family was also on board. The pilot and the co-pilot as released by Aviastar, were:

- Captain Iri Afriadi, with 2,911 hours and 58 minutes of flying experience.
- First Officer Yudhistira Febby with 4,035 hours and 36 minutes of flying experience.

== Investigation ==
As investigators arrived at the crash site, they suspected that the plane bounced twice before it exploded and burned. According to reports, the plane hit a tree on the other side of the mountain, as there were broken tree branches found in the area. The plane caught fire and slammed into the top of the mountain, killing all on board. Investigators also created the chronology of the discovery of the wreckage and explained how the plane crashed with drone footage.

A preliminary investigation report was published 21 January 2016. At 06:37 UTC, the pilots agreed to fly direct to Barru as one had this experience. A few seconds later, the second-in-command suggested to delay the direct flight for a while. There was partial cloud formation. At 06:51 UTC, the pilot-in-command said that he wanted to climb then the CVR recorded the sounds of impact and stopped recording. The aircraft impacted trees and crashed at 7,734 ft.

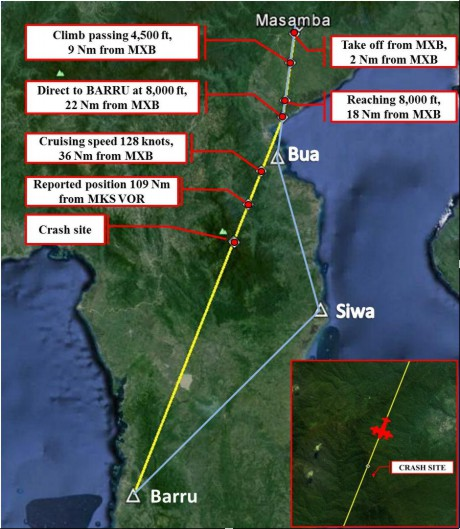
The actual route and the designated route of Aviastar Flight 7503

Investigators retrieved the designated flight route and compared it with the route that the crew of Flight 7503 took. It was revealed that the pilot had deviated from its original route. The predicted route was from point Bua to Siwa and then to Barru, however, after the crew reached point Bua, they decided to fly direct to Barru. The route that the crew took is mountainous with several mountains ahead (terrain heights of between 9,600 and 11,000 feet) while the designated route was near the shoreline with no significant height. The weather data on the crash site also revealed that there were clouds on the "shortcut" route, which would limit their visibility. With mountainous terrain and limited visibility, this would endanger the flight.

Investigators then focused on why the pilots decided to fly the plane direct to point Barru instead to point Siwa. Investigators considered the Situational Awareness and the process of the decision making to fly direct to Barru. It was revealed that one of the crew had done the same thing before, and during the previous flight no incident occurred. This might have caused one of the crew to trust the one that had done it before in the past to cut the route and make a direct flight to Barru. During its flight to point Barru, neither the pilot nor the co-pilot discussed the environmental condition ahead. The absence of discussion in regard to the conditions ahead meant that the pilots had not properly considered the operational implications of flying the direct route, leading to a loss of situational awareness.

The final report was finally published by the NTSC on 4 January 2017, with their findings as follow:

- The aircraft had a valid Certificate of Airworthiness prior to the accident and was operated within the weight and balance envelope.
- Both pilots had valid licenses and medical certificates.
- The accident flight from Masamba (WAFM) to Makassar (WAAA) was the 6th sector for the aircraft and the crew that day. The Captain acted as Pilot Flying and the First Officer acted as Pilot Monitoring.
- The satellite image published by BMKG at 07:00 UTC showed that there were cloud formations at the accident area. The local villagers stated that the weather on the accident area was cloudy at the time of the accident.
- The aircraft departed Masamba at 06:25 UTC (14:25 LT), conducted under VFR with cruising altitude of 8,000 feet and estimated time of arrival at Makassar of 07.39.
- After reaching cruising altitude, at about 22 Nm from Masamba, the flight deviated from the visual route and flew direct to BARRU on a heading of 200° toward the area with high terrain and cloud formation based on the BMKG satellite image
- The pilots decision-making process did not show any evidence that they were concerned about the environment conditions ahead which had more risks and required correct flight judgment.
- The CVR did not record EGPWS aural caution and warning prior to the impact. The investigation could not determine the reason for the absence of the EGPWS.
- The CVR data and cut on the trees indicated that the aircraft was on a straight and level flight and there was no indication of avoidance action by climbing or turning.
- The SAR Agency did not receive any crash signal from the aircraft ELT most likely due to the ELT antenna detaching during the impact.
- Regarding the operation of the EGPWS for the flight crew, a special briefing was performed however there was no special training.
- The operational test of the TAWS system was not included in the pilot checklist.
- The investigation could not determine the installation and the last revision of the TAWS terrain database.
- The investigation could not find the functional test result document after the installation of the TAWS.
- Some of the DHC-6 pilots had not been briefed for the operation of the TAWS and EGPWS.

Contributing factor(s):

- Deviation from the company visual route without properly considering the elevated risks of cruising altitude lower than the highest terrain and instrument meteorological condition in addition with the absence of the EGPWS warning resulted in the omission of avoidance actions.

== See also ==
- Controlled flight into terrain
- Merpati Nusantara Airlines Flight 9760, crashed while on approach to Oksibil Airport in 2009.
- Mount Salak Sukhoi Superjet 100 crash, crashed while on a demonstration flight in Indonesia in 2012. The crew had turned off the terrain warning system and were unaware that they were operating in close proximity to mountains and impacted Mount Salak.
- Trigana Air Service Flight 267, crashed while on approach to Oksibil airport earlier in the same year.
