= Seko Airport =

Seko Airport Bandara Seko
- IATA: none; ICAO: WAFN

Summary
- Airport type: Public
- Operator: Government
- Serves: Seko
- Location: North Luwu Regency, South Sulawesi, Indonesia
- Time zone: WITA (UTC+08:00)
- Elevation AMSL: 1,147 m (3,763 ft)
- Coordinates: 2°16′17″S 119°53′42″E

Map
- Location of the airport in Sulawesi

Runways
Direction	Length		Surface
Direction	ft	m	Surface
09/27	3,300	1,000	Asphalt

Statistics (2019)
- Passengers: 9,012
- Aircraft movement: 1,437

The Seko Airport is an airport in Seko, North Luwu Regency, South Sulawesi, Indonesia.

== General ==
The runway is usable by CASA C-212 aircraft. It serves around 1,300 to 1,500 aircraft annually.

== History ==
There was already a grass airstrip at Seko in 1984, being used by missionaries. It was paved in 1997, and pioneer air service began from Andi Jemma Airport at Masamba in 1999. Service with the 20-seat C-212 aircraft began in 2006, with flights to Poso and Palu. Current plans are to extend the airport runway to 1,900 meters to enable ATR 72 aircraft to use the airport.

== Airlines and destinations ==
Airlines	Destinations
Susi Air	Ampana, Masamba, Palu, Toraja

It is also served by a pioneer cargo route to Masamba.
