= Toraja Airport =

Airport in Indonesia

Toraja Airport Bandar Udara Toraja
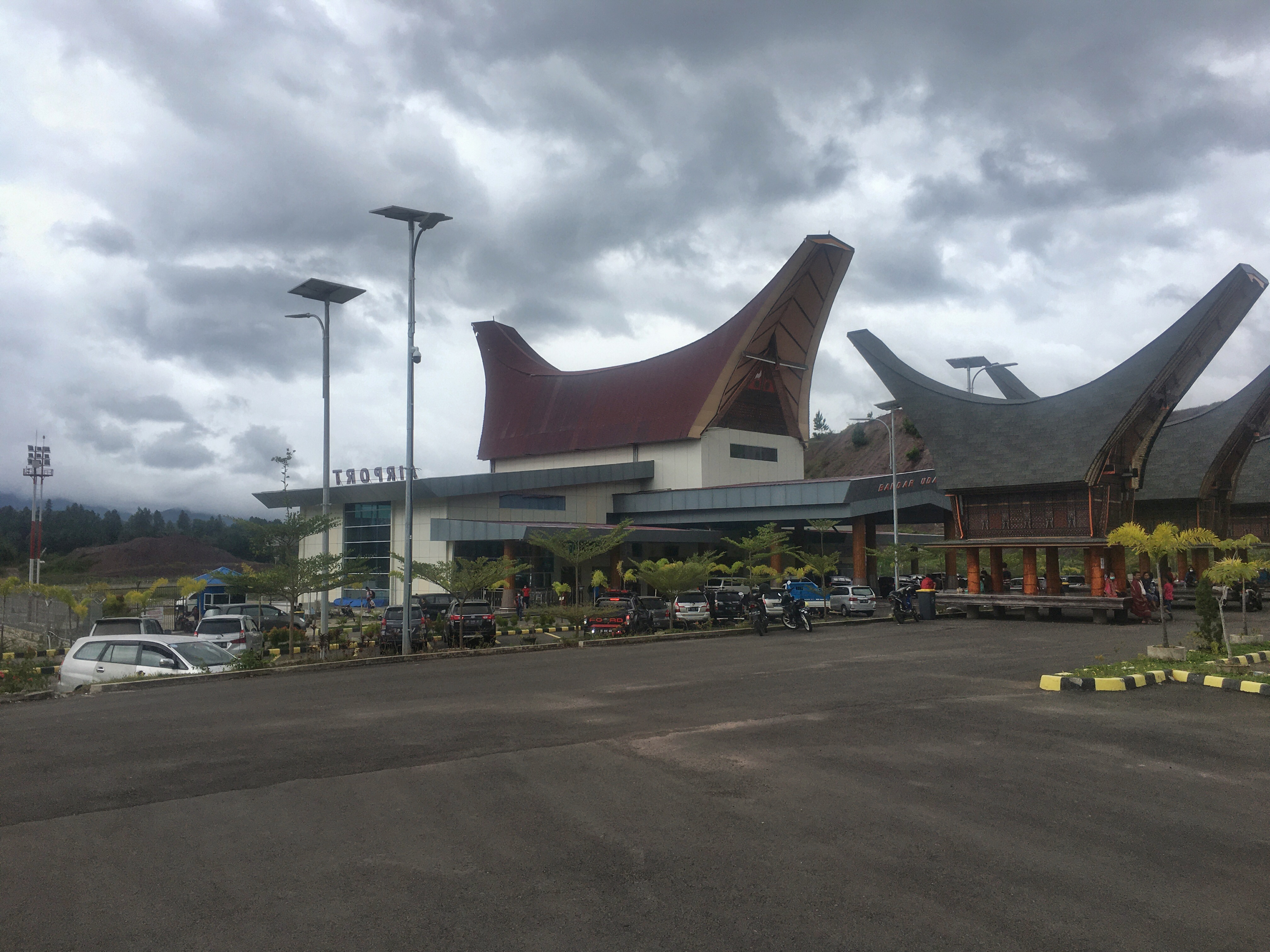
- IATA: TRT; ICAO: WAFB

Summary
- Airport type: Public
- Owner: Government of Indonesia
- Operator: Directorate General of Civil Aviation
- Serves: Tana Toraja
- Location: Mengkendek District, Tana Toraja Regency, South Sulawesi, Sulawesi, Indonesia
- Time zone: WITA (UTC+08:00)
- Elevation AMSL: 879 m (2,884 ft)
- Coordinates: 3.185833°S 119.91775°E

Map
- Location of the airport in Sulawesi

Runways
| Direction | Length | | Surface |
| Direction | m | ft | Surface |
|---|---|---|---|
| 04/22 | 2,000 | 6,562 | Asphalt |

Statistics (2024)
- Passengers: 20,627 (▼1.6%)
- Cargo (tonnes): 6.66
- Aircraft movements: 670 (▼3.3%)
- Source: DGCA

Toraja Airport (IATA: TRT, ICAO: WAFB), formerly known as Buntu Kunik Airport, is a domestic regional airport serving Tana Toraja Regency in South Sulawesi, Indonesia. The airport was constructed to replace Pongtiku Airport, which was unable to expand due to limited available land to accommodate increasing passenger demand. Located in Mengkendek District, approximately 11 km (6.8 mi) from Makale, the administrative capital of Tana Toraja Regency, the airport serves as an important gateway to Tana Toraja and the surrounding areas, which are major tourist destinations in South Sulawesi. As of 2026, scheduled services at the airport are limited. Wings Air operates flights to Makassar, the provincial capital of South Sulawesi, while Susi Air operates a pioneer route to Seko in North Luwu Regency. The airport previously also had direct service to Balikpapan operated by Citilink, but the route has since been discontinued.

== History ==
=== Background and construction ===
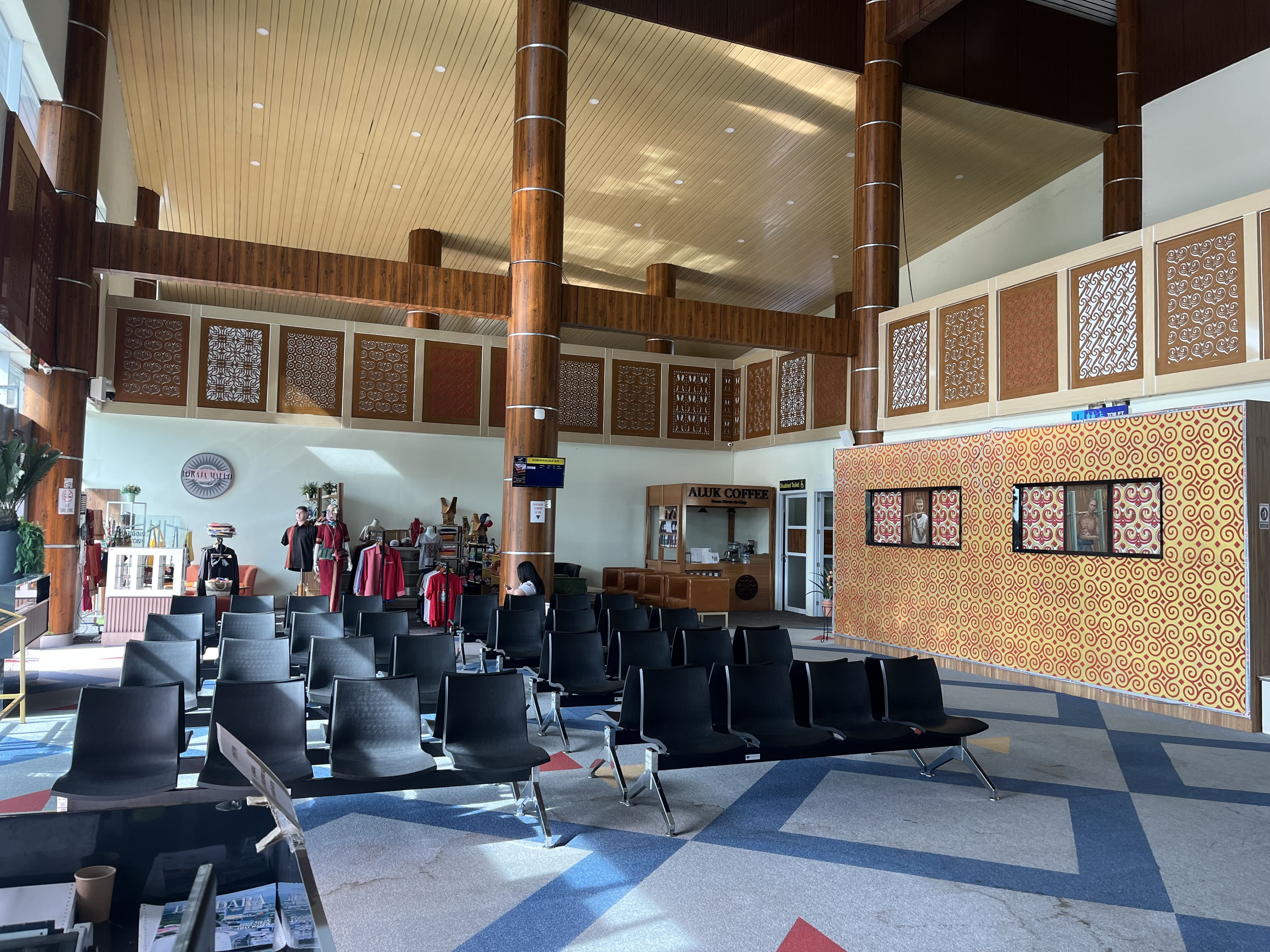
Departure gate

The proposal to build a new airport in Toraja originated due to the spatial and geographic limitations of Pongtiku Airport in Rantetayo. Surrounded by mountainous terrain, Pongtiku Airport possessed a restricted runway that prevented expansion to meet national standards, while frequent adverse weather and poor visibility regularly disrupted flight operations. Consequently, local and central governments conducted joint surveys to identify a safer, more strategic location for regional air transport.

Following a series of feasibility studies and field surveys, Buntu Kunik was selected as the site for the new airport, covering an area of approximately 141 hectares. Located on a relatively flat land contour for a high-altitude region, the area provided favorable visibility for aviation operations. The site was named after Buntu Kunik, a local hill (buntu) adjacent to the location. Construction began around 2011 and was designated a National Strategic Project (Proyek Strategis Nasional) managed by the Ministry of Transportation. The construction project was affected by several issues, resulting in a two-year suspension of work between 2016 and 2018. Construction resumed after the project was put out to tender again, with Bosowa Corp winning the contract to continue the development.

Development proceeded in phases to accommodate the region's challenging topography and access infrastructure. The initial phase included a 1,700-meter runway designed for extension to 2,000 meters to support regional turboprop aircraft such as the ATR 72-600. Auxiliary infrastructure—including a passenger terminal, apron, control tower, and access roads—was constructed concurrently. A total of approximately Rp800 billion was invested in the construction of the airport. The construction was a major engineering undertaking, involving the excavation of approximately 6 million m³ of earth to cut through three hills in order to create the airport's runway. The airport's first landing trial was conducted on 12 August 2020, using a Hawker 900XP calibration aircraft operated by the Ministry of Transportation.

The airport started soft operations on 4 September 2020, and was officially inaugurated by then-President Joko Widodo on 18 March 2021. During the opening ceremony, the administration highlighted the project as a key initiative to promote more equitable infrastructure development in remote areas and improve air connectivity across northern South Sulawesi. The airport is expected to strengthen connectivity between Tana Toraja and other regions, particularly Makassar, the provincial capital, reducing travel time from approximately nine hours by road to around 50 minutes by air. Since its opening, the airport has served as an important transport link, supporting the development of tourism, economic integration, and regional mobility in the Toraja area.

=== Contemporary history ===
Following the commencement of airport operations, local communities began advocating for a change to the airport's name. Proposals for a renaming had been put forward as early as 2019, when then-Governor of South Sulawesi Nurdin Abdullah suggested renaming the airport Toraja International Airport, arguing that the name would be easier to remember. At the time, the airport was known as Buntu Kunik Airport. However, the name had not yet been officially established, as it had been assigned by the local government and had not been formally proposed to the central government. Following a meeting of traditional Torajan leaders in 2020, representatives from all 19 districts of Tana Toraja agreed to name the new airport Toraja Airport. The proposed name was subsequently submitted to and approved by the South Sulawesi Provincial Government and the Ministry of Transportation, resulting in the airport's present name.

When the airport commenced operations, only two airlines, Citilink and Wings Air, served the airport, with both operating flights to Makassar. On 25 August 2023, Citilink introduced a new route to Balikpapan in East Kalimantan. The service continued until December 2025, when it was discontinued due to low passenger occupancy and the termination of subsidies from the Tana Toraja Regency government. In July 2025, Wings Air launched a new route to Manado in North Sulawesi. However, the service operated for only approximately two weeks due to very low passenger occupancy. The South Sulawesi Provincial Government has also proposed establishing direct flights to Jakarta and Denpasar, without requiring passengers to transit through Makassar. It has also considered upgrading the airport's status to an international airport to accommodate international flights in the future.

== Facilities and development ==
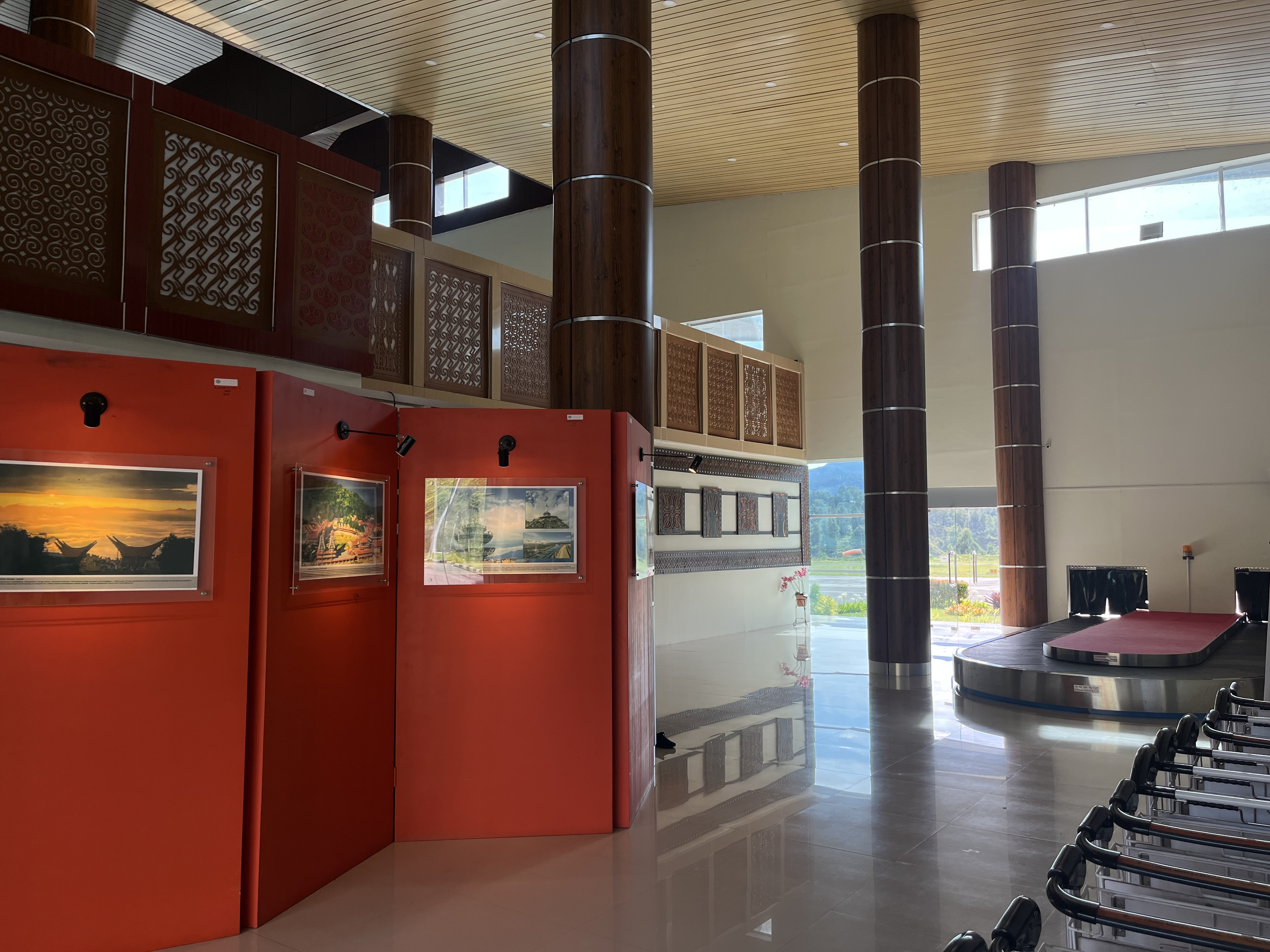
Baggage claim area

Toraja Airport has a passenger terminal covering an area of 1,152 m² and a designed annual capacity of 45,000 passengers, with its departure area can accommodate up to 154 passengers. The airport terminal incorporates elements of traditional Torajan architecture, drawing inspiration from the traditional Torajan house, the tongkonan, and its accompanying rice barns, known as alang. The passenger terminal is equipped with a range of facilities, including check-in counters, boarding gates, baggage carousels in the arrivals area, ATMs, coffee shops, a children's playground, a canteen, prayer rooms, charging stations, souvenir shops, a parking area, and toilets, including accessible facilities for passengers with disabilities. In addition to the passenger terminal, the airport has a 400 m² office building and a 250 m² PKP-PK (Aircraft Rescue and Fire Fighting) building. The airport is also equipped with a 4,000 m² inspection road and a 7,306 m² perimeter fence.

On the airside, the airport has a single runway measuring 2,000 m × 30 m, which was extended from its original length of 1,700 m when the airport commenced operations. The runway is capable of accommodating narrow-body aircraft such as the Boeing 737 and Airbus A320, although the airport currently only serves aircraft up to the size of the ATR 72. Land has been reserved to allow for a possible future runway extension to 2,500 m. The runway is also equipped with a Runway End Safety Area (RESA) measuring 90 × 60 m, as well as runway turn pads at both ends. In addition to the runway, the airport has an aircraft apron measuring 94.50 × 117.50 m and a taxiway measuring 115 × 15 m.

== Airlines and destinations ==
| Airlines | Destinations |
|---|---|
| Susi Air | Seko |
| Wings Air | Makassar |

== Statistics ==
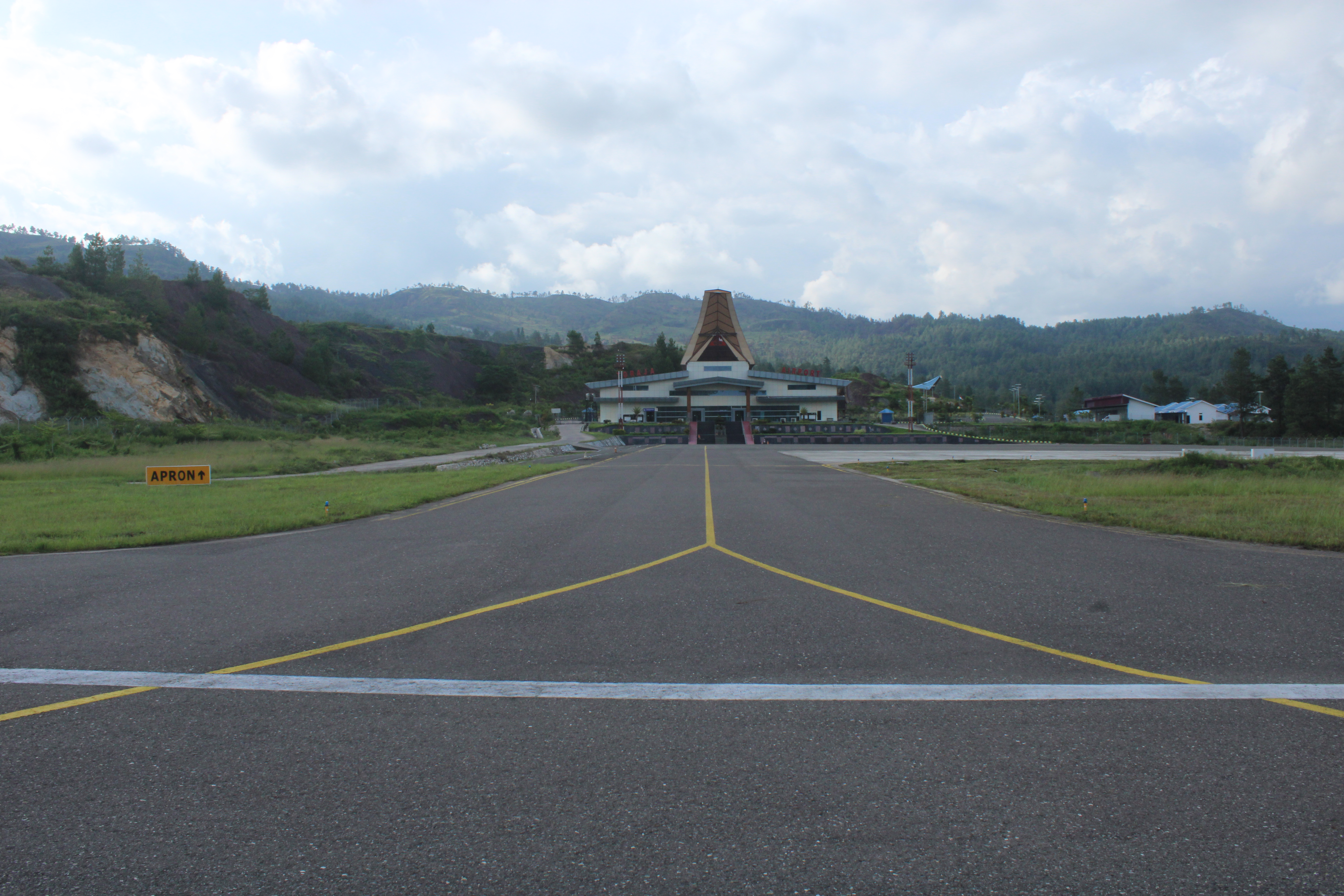
Apron view of Toraja Airport

Annual passenger numbers and aircraft statistics
| Year | Passengers handled | Passenger % change | Cargo (tonnes) | Cargo % change | Aircraft movements | Aircraft % change |
|---|---|---|---|---|---|---|
| 2006 | N/A | Steady | N/A | Steady | N/A | Steady |
| 2007 | 1,089 | Steady | N/A | Steady | 150 | Steady |
| 2008 | N/A | Steady | N/A | Steady | N/A | Steady |
| 2009 | 1,352 | Steady | N/A | Steady | 226 | Steady |
| 2010 | 2,957 | ▲118.7 | N/A | Steady | 176 | ▼22.1 |
| 2011 | 1,248 | ▼57.8 | N/A | Steady | 259 | ▲47.2 |
| 2012 | 2,277 | ▲82.5 | N/A | Steady | 224 | ▼13.5 |
| 2013 | 1,031 | ▼54.7 | N/A | Steady | 182 | ▼18.8 |
| 2014 | 1,099 | ▲6.6 | 2.35 | Steady | 262 | ▲44.0 |
| 2015 | 1,037 | ▼5.6 | N/A | Steady | 330 | ▲26.0 |
| 2016 | 1,973 | ▲90.3 | N/A | Steady | 283 | ▼14.2 |
| 2017 | 8,670 | ▲339.4 | 0.47 | Steady | 540 | ▲90.8 |
| 2018 | 1,811 | ▼79.1 | 0.88 | ▲87.2 | 242 | ▼55.2 |
| 2019 | 837 | ▼53.8 | 0.51 | ▼42.0 | 184 | ▼24.0 |
| 2020 | 8,293 | ▲890.8 | 0.04 | ▼92.2 | 378 | ▲105.4 |
| 2021 | 16,452 | ▲98.4 | N/A | Steady | 582 | ▲54.0 |
| 2022 | 20,626 | ▲25.4 | N/A | Steady | 598 | ▲2.7 |
| 2023 | 20,965 | ▲1.6 | N/A | Steady | 693 | ▲15.9 |
| 2024 | 20,627 | ▼1.6 | 6.66 | Steady | 670 | ▼3.3 |
^{Source: DGCA, BPS}

Notes: Data prior to 2020 are derived from records of Pongtiku Airport.
