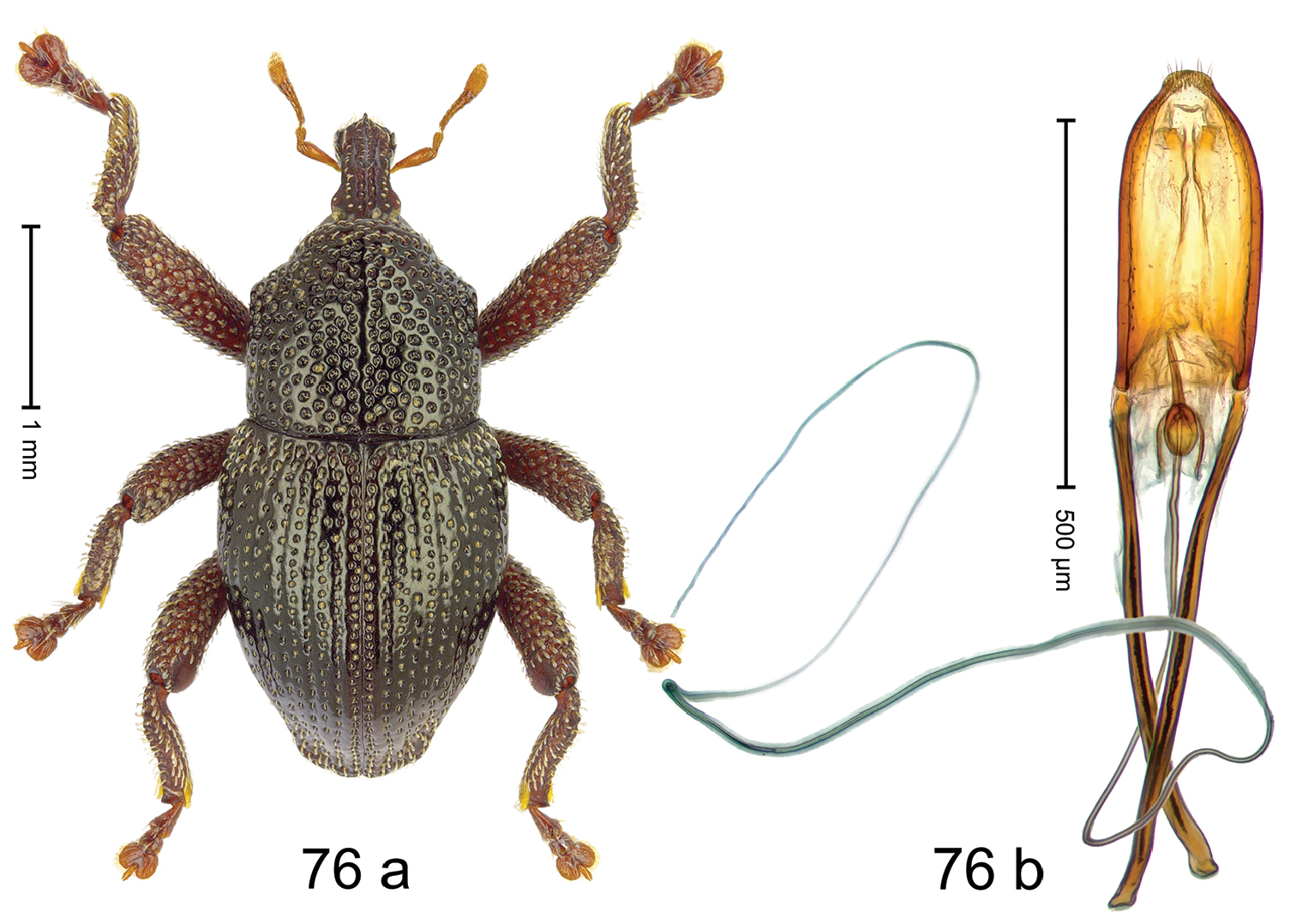

Scientific classification
- Kingdom: Animalia
- Phylum: Arthropoda
- Clade: Pancrustacea
- Class: Insecta
- Order: Coleoptera
- Suborder: Polyphaga
- Infraorder: Cucujiformia
- Family: Curculionidae
- Genus: Trigonopterus
- Species: T. reticulatus

Binomial name
- Trigonopterus reticulatus Riedel, 2019

= Trigonopterus reticulatus =

Species of beetle

Trigonopterus reticulatus is a species of flightless weevil in the subfamily Cryptorhynchinae. The species was described in May 2019 and is named after its pitted, reticulate integument. The beetle is 1.95–3.25 mm long. It has ferruginous antennae and legs, while the rest of the body is black. Endemic to Central Sulawesi, where it has been recorded from near Ampana. Found in leaf litter of lowland forests at elevations of 130–170 m.

== Taxonomy ==
Trigonopterus nitidulus was described by the entomologist Alexander Riedel in 2019 on the basis of an adult male specimen collected from near Ampana in Central Sulawesi, Indonesia. The specific epithet is derived from the Latin adjective reticulatus, meaning 'reticulated', and refers to the beetle's punctate-reticulate integument.

== Description ==
The beetle is 1.95–3.25 mm long. It has ferruginous antennae and legs, while the rest of the body is black. Its body is elongated, with a noticeable narrowing between the pronotum and elytra when viewed from above, and it appears flat from the side. The rostrum has a central ridge and two submedian ridges, with the grooves between them lined with rows of upright, elongated scales. The epistome is short and features a central denticle, with two additional denticles on the right and one on the left side of the rostral tip.

The pronotum is nearly square-shaped on top, forming an angled front edge that narrows slightly before a weak constriction near the tip. Its surface is densely and coarsely punctured, with each puncture bearing a fine, flat seta. The spaces between punctures are reticulate and mostly smooth. A weakly raised, unpunctured line runs down the center. The elytra are densely and irregularly punctured, with striae 1 and 2 faintly marked. The tip is nearly straight and both the base and tip have a few scattered scales.

The forelegs are relatively long. The femora have a small acute tooth, and the anteroventral ridges of the middle and hind femora are crenate. Their front surfaces are coarsely punctured and reticulate, with each puncture bearing a long, club-shaped scale. The hind femur also has a weakly toothed upper rear edge and a stridulatory patch near the tip. The upper edge of the tibiae is notched. The first two abdominal segments are slightly sunken and coarsely punctured, with each puncture bearing an upright, elongated scale. The fifth segment is flat, coarsely punctured, and covered with upright scales.

In males, the penis has nearly parallel sides that taper to a somewhat angular tip, with a few scattered hairs near the end. The top surface has setae pointing toward the midline. The apodemes are twice the length of the penis body. The transfer apparatus is spiniform and about half the length of the penis. The ductus ejaculatorius has a faintly defined bulb at its base.

== Distribution ==
Endemic to Central Sulawesi, where it has been recorded from near Ampana. Found in leaf litter of lowland forests at elevations of 130–170 m.
