= Pongtiku Airport =

Former airport in South Sulawesi, Indonesia

Pongtiku Airport Bandara Pongtiku
- IATA: ~~TTR~~; ICAO: ~~WAFT~~

Summary
- Airport type: Public, defunct
- Operator: Government
- Serves: Makale
- Location: Tana Toraja Regency, South Sulawesi, Sulawesi Island, Indonesia
- Closed: 4 September 2020
- Time zone: WITA (UTC+08:00)
- Elevation AMSL: 879 m (2,884 ft)
- Coordinates: 03°02′33.23″S 119°49′15.38″E

Map
- Location of the airport in Sulawesi

Runways
| Direction | Length | | Surface |
| Direction | m | ft | Surface |
|---|---|---|---|
| 12/30 | 1,300 | 4,265 | Asphalt |

Pongtiku Airport ~~(IATA: TTR, ICAO: WAFT)~~ is a defunct airport in Rantetayo, Tana Toraja Regency, Province South Sulawesi, Indonesia. It had a 1,300 meter runway and was served by ATR 42 and Fokker 50 aircraft. The airport was closed on 4 September 2020 with the opening of the Buntu Kunik Airport.

== Former airlines and destinations ==
| Airlines | Destinations |
|---|---|
| Gatari Air Service | Makassar |
| Susi Air | Masamba, Seko |
| Aviastar | Makassar |
| Wings Air | Makassar |
