= Kingdom of Luwu =

Kingdom

Coordinates: 3°S 120.2°E

Kingdom of Luwu (House of Royal Buginese Luwu) ᨕᨉᨈᨘᨓ ᨑᨗ ᨒᨘᨓᨘ Addatuang ri Luwu (Buginese) Buginese royal house
- ca. 1300–1954
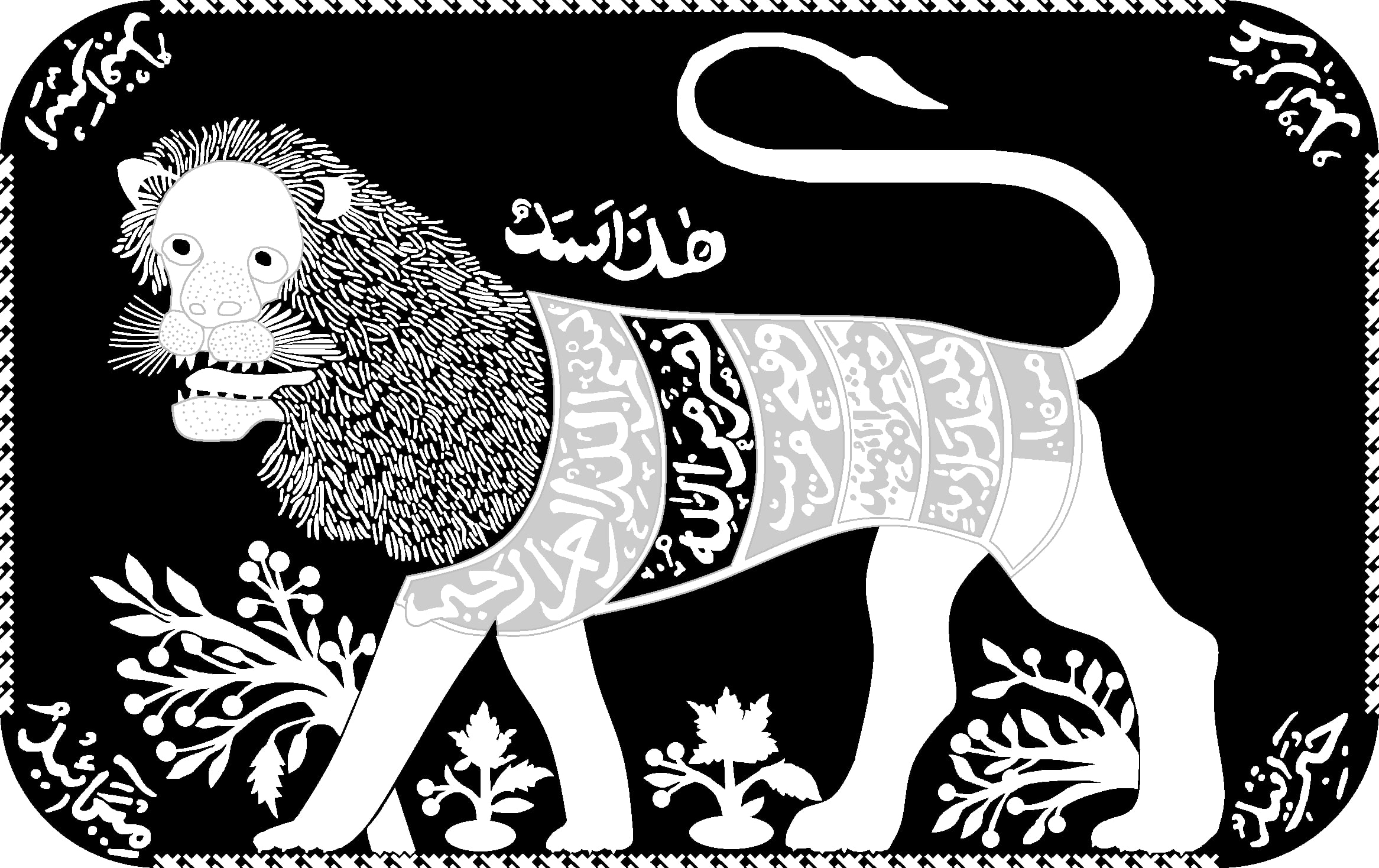
- Macangnge flag of Luwu used by the Attoriolong
- Status: Part of Indonesia
- Capital: Malangke before c.1620 Palopo after c.1620
- Common languages: Buginese
- Religion: Hinduism, Buddhism, and Animism prior to c.1605 Sunni Islam after 1605
- Government: Monarchy
- Datu Mappanjunge' ri Luwu
- History
  - Established: ca. 1300
  - Dissolution of Sultanate: 1954
- Currency: No official currency
- Today part of: Indonesia (as Luwu Regency, North Luwu Regency, East Luwu Regency, Palopo City)

The Kingdom of Luwu (also Luwuq or Wareq) was a multi-cultural, Bugis-led polity located in the northern part of the modern-day South Sulawesi province of Indonesia, on the island of Sulawesi. Previously thought to have flourished between the 10th and 14th century, recent archaeological research has challenged this idea. While the kingdom was abolished in 1954, the office of Datu Luwu continues to this day as symbol of South Sulawesi cultural identity.

== History ==
=== Origin of Luwu ===
In 1889, Dutch administrator of Makassar, Braam Morris placed Luwu's peak territorial extent between the 10th and 14th centuries, but offered no clear evidence. The La Galigo, an epic poem composed in a literary form of the Bugis language, is the likely source of the dating. Morris' theory combined two older concepts which were already common in the region, which are (1) the so-called 'primordial age' as described within La Galigo, and (2) the widespread belief of other Bugis polities in South Sulawesi, who viewed the rulers of Luwu as the most senior lineages of all Bugis rulers. However, historians and archaeologists expressed doubts regarding Luwu's antiquity, noting that historical records and chronologies of Luwu were 'disappointingly shallow'

The Bugis world described in the La Galigo depicts a vaguely defined world of coastal and riverine kingdoms whose economies are based on trade. Two early centers of this world were Luwu and the kingdom of Cina (pronounced Cheena) in what is now Wajo. The incompatibility of the La Galigo's trade-based political economy with the agricultural economies of other South Sulawesi kingdoms led scholars to posit an intervening period of chaos to separate the two societies chronologically. Archaeological and textual research carried out since the 1980s has undermined this chronology. Extensive surveys and excavations in Luwu have revealed that the Bugis-speaking kingdom is a century or so younger than the oldest polities of the southwest peninsula. The earliest textual reference to Luwu is in the Majapahit court poem Desawarnana (c.1365), which lists Luwu, Bantaeng in southern part of the island, and Uda (possibly Cina) as the three major powers on the peninsula. However, there is no convincing archaeological evidence of Bugis settlement in Luwu region before c.1300.

The new understanding is that Bugis speaking settlers from the western Cénrana valley began to settle along the coastal margins of Luwu around the year 1300 CE. The Gulf of Bone is not a merely Bugis-speaking area only: it is a thinly populated region of great ethnic diversity in which Bugis speakers are a minority among the speakers of Pamona, Padoe, Wotu and Lemolang languages who lived on the coastal lowlands and foothills, while the highland valleys are home to groups speaking other Central and South Sulawesi languages. The Bugis are found almost solely along the coast, to which they have evidently migrated in order to trade with Luwu's indigenous peoples. It is clear both from archaeological and textual sources that Luwu was a Bugis-led coalition of various ethnic groups, united by trade relationships and by the ability of the Datu' (ruler) of Luwu to enforce peace among neighboring hill tribes. The main centres of Bugis settlement were (and still are) Bua, Ponrang, Malangke, and Cerekang near Malili. The migration of Bugis from the central lakes area to Luwu was evidently led by members of Cina's ruling family, a loose coalition of high-ranking families claiming a common ancestry that ruled settlements across the Cenrana and Walennae valleys. This can be surmised from the fact that Luwu and Cina share the same founding myth of a tomanurung or heavenly-descended being called Simpurusia, and that both versions of this myth state that Simpurusia descended at Lompo, in Sengkang. Cina was absorbed in the 16th century by its former tributaries of Soppeng and Wajo, after which its ruling family effectively vanished. However, the ancient line of Cina's rulers are believed to continue in Luwu until the abolition of the kingdoms in 1954. It is likely that the widespread belief that Luwu is older than other South Sulawesi kingdoms stems partly from this illustrious lineage and accounts for the precedence today of the Datu of Luwu over all the former polities of South Sulawesi.

Luwu's political economy was based on the smelting of iron ore brought down from Lake Matano to Malangke on the central coastal plain. The iron was worked into weapons and agricultural tools and exported to the rice-growing southern lowlands. This brought the kingdom great wealth, and by the mid-14th century Luwu had become the feared overlord of large parts of the southwest and southeast peninsula. The earliest identifiable ruler is Bataraguru (mid-15th century) whose name appears in a peace treaty with Bone. However, the first ruler for which we have any detailed information was Dewaraja (ruled c. 1493‒ c. 1526). Stories current today in South Sulawesi tell of his aggressive attacks on the neighboring kingdoms of Wajo and Sidenreng. Luwu's power was eclipsed in the 16th century by the rising power of the southern agrarian kingdoms, and its military defeats are set out in the Chronicle of Bone.

=== Islamic Luwu ===
On 4 or 5 February 1605, Luwu's ruler, La Patiwareq, Daeng Pareqbung, became the first major South Sulawesi ruler to embrace Islam, taking as his title Sultan Muhammad Wali Mu’z’hir (or Muzahir) al-din. La Patiwareq is buried at Malangke and is referred to in the chronicles as Matinroe ri Wareq, ‘He who sleeps at Wareq’, the former palace-centre of Luwuq. His religious teacher, Dato Sulaiman, is buried nearby. Around 1620, Malangke was abandoned following a civil war, and a new capital was established to the west at Palopo.

=== Colonial Luwu ===
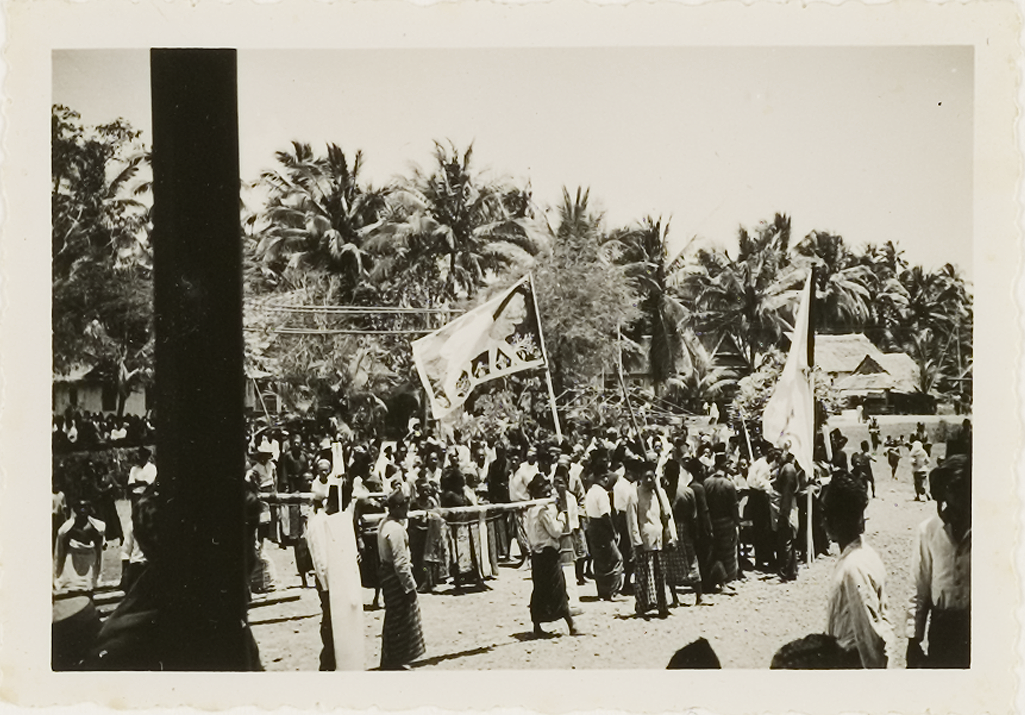
Funeral of the Datu We Kambo Daeng Risompa. The Macangnge Flag visible.

By the 19th century, Luwu had become a backwater. James Brooke, later Rajah of Sarawak, wrote in the 1830s that ‘Luwu is the oldest Bugis state, and the most decayed. [...] Palopo is a miserable town, consisting of about 300 houses, scattered and dilapidated. [...] It is difficult to believe that Luwu could ever have been a powerful state, except in a very low state of native civilisation.’

=== Present-day Luwu ===
In the 1960s Luwu was a focus of an Islamic rebellion led by Kahar Muzakkar. Today the former kingdom is home to the world's largest nickel mine and is experiencing an economic boom fueled by inward migration, yet it still retains much of its original frontier atmosphere.

== Economy ==
Unlike other Bugis polities in South Sulawesi which based its economy on rice production and trade, Luwu was known to be a center of metalwork, especially iron, whose ore were both imported and extracted locally. Luwu's prestige, which was based on iron mining activities and ironware exports, led to the island on which Luwu existed to be known as Sulawesi, or 'iron island'.

In addition, Luwu seemed to base its economy on arboriculture (or forest produce) exports. Dammar gum, rattan, ebony, gaharu, and mangrove timbers were thought as resources extracted upland, then exported via Luwu's port on the Gulf of Bone.

== Rulers of Luwu ==
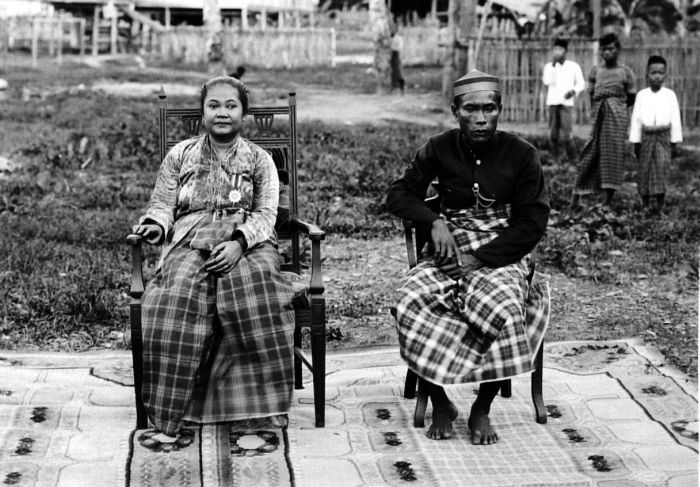
The Queen of Luwu, Wé Kambo Daëng Risompa, and her second husband, La Batjo To Vapilé Opoe Patoenroe, first member of the Andat of Luwu.

Rulers of Luwu used the title Datu Mappanjungé ri Luwu which means "Datu who has an umbrella in Luwu" or "Datu who shaded Luwu", shortened to Datu Luwu, Pajung Luwu, or Pajungé.

=== eList of the King and the Queen Regents of the Kingdom of Luwu ===
Source: King List of Luwu

- Myth: Simpurusia, Manurung ri Lompo
- Myth: Anakaji, son of Simpurusia
- Myth: Wé Matengngnaémpong, daughter of Anakaji
- Legendary: Tampabalusu, Tomanurung of Tompotikka
- Legendary: Tanrabalusu, son of Tampabalusu
- Semi-legendary: To Appanangi
- Semi-legendary: Batara Guru (not Bataraguru of the La Galigo)
- 15th century: To Sangkawana (?= La Pasampoi, Maddanreng ri Talottenreng in Wajo: source: Lontara Sukkuna Wajo)
- 15th century: La Busatana (source Lontara Sukkuna Wajo)
- Late 15th century - c.1528: Déwaraja, To Sangerreng, Datu Kellali
- 16th century: Datu ri Saolebbi ("Ruler in the Splendid Palace")
- 16th century: Sangkaria, Datu Soreang (source: Chronicle of Bone)
- Late 16th century: Maningo ri Bajo
- c.1595‒c.1615: Andi Pattiwareq Daeng Paraqbung or Pati Arase, titled Petta Matinroé ri Malangké (Petta Luwu) “as the first king to accept the teachings of Islamic law under Datuk Sulaiman”
- c.1615‒1637: Patipasaung, Sultan Abdullah
- 1637‒1663: La Basso or La Pakéubangan or Sultan Ahmad Nazaruddin, titled Petta Matinroé ri Gowa (Lokkoé)
- 1663‒1704: Settiaraja, titled Petta Matinroé ri Tompoq Tikkaq
- 1704‒1704? Raja Opu La Maddusila Petta Mattinroe ri Polka'., ruled when Settiaraja went to help Gowa against the VOC.
- 1704‒1715: La Onro Topalaguna, titled Petta Matinroé ri Langkanaé
- 1706‒1715: Batari Tungké, titled Sultanah Fatimah Petta Matinroé ri Pattiro – the 2nd female ruler of Luwu
- 1715‒1748: Batari Toja, titled Sultanah Zaenab Matinroé ri Tippulué – the 3rd female ruler of Luwu; she was also the ruler of Bone and Soppeng
- 1748‒1760 & 1765‒1778: Wé Tenriléléang, titled Petta Matinroé ri Soréang – the 4th female ruler of Luwu; she ascended the throne twice; she was also the ruler of Tanette
- 1760‒1765: Tosibengngareng, titled La Kaséng Patta Matinroé ri Kaluku Bodoé
- 1778‒1810: La Tenripeppang or Daéng Paliq, titled Petta Matinroé ri Sabbangparu
- 1810‒1825: We Tenri Awaru Sultanah Hawa, titled Petta Matinroé ri Tengngana Luwu – the 5th female ruler of Luwu; she was also the ruler of Soppeng
- 1825‒1854: La Oddang Péro, titled Petta Matinroé Kombong Beru
- 1854‒1880: Patipatau or Sultan Abdul Karim Toapanyompa, titled Petta Matinroé ri Limpomajang
- 1880‒1883: Wé Addi Luwu, titled Petta Matinroé Temmalullu
- 1883‒1901: Iskandar Opu Daéng Paliq, titled Petta Matinroé ri Matekko
- 1901‒1935: Andi Kambo, also known as Siti Husaimah Andi Kambo Opu Daéng Risompa Sultanah Zaenab, titled Petta Matinroé ri Bintanna – the 6th female ruler of Luwu; the Dutch first came to the Kingdom of Luwu during the reign of Andi Kambo.
- 1935‒1945 & 1950‒1965: Andi Djemma, titled Petta Matinroe' ri Amaradekanna is a Pajung National Hero of the Republic of Indonesia from South Sulawesi
- 1945‒1950: Andi Jelling, was Pajung, ruling when Andi Jemma was detained and exiled by the Dutch.
- 1965‒1987: Andi Bau Alamsyah, titled Petta MatinroE ri Tellu Boccona
- 1987‒1994: Andi Bau Tenripadang, titled Opu Datu
- 1994‒2012: Wé Andi Addi Luwu, titled Opu Daengna Patiware
- 2012‒Present: Andi Maradang Mackulau Opu To Bau

== See also ==
- History of Indonesia
- Sultan of Selangor Malaysia
