= 2009 Aviastar British Aerospace 146 crash =

Aviation accident in Indonesia

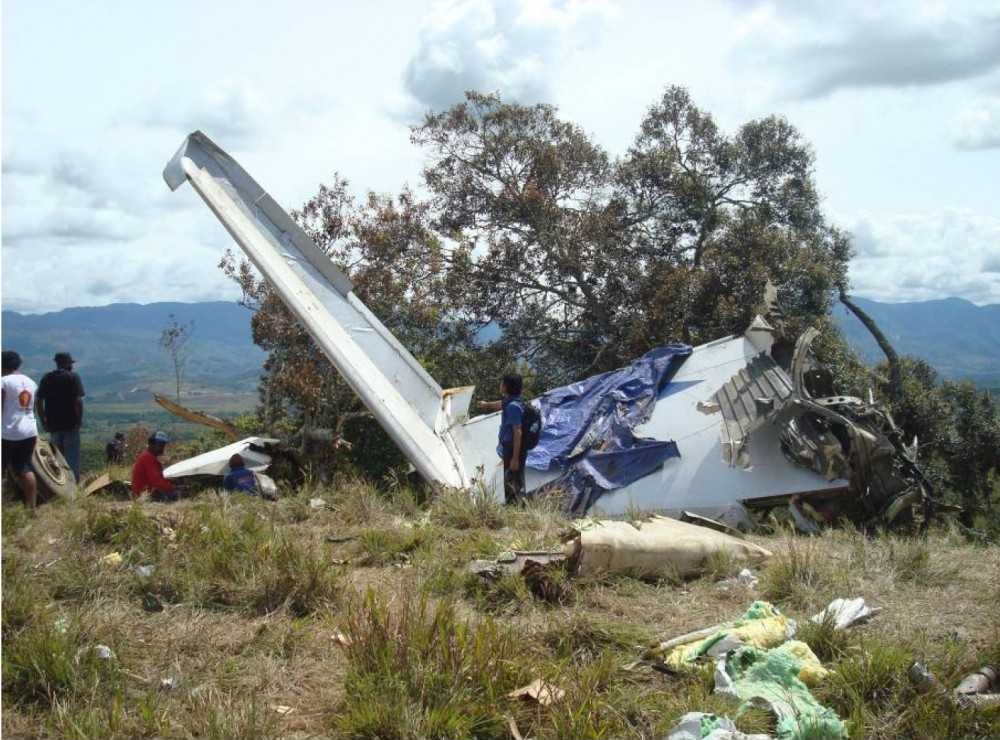
- Wreckage of the aircraft

Accident
- Date: 9 April 2009
- Summary: Controlled Flight into terrain; CRM failure and pilot error
- Site: Pikei Hill, Tengah Mountain, Wamena, Indonesia; 04°02′18″S 138°56′47″E

Aircraft
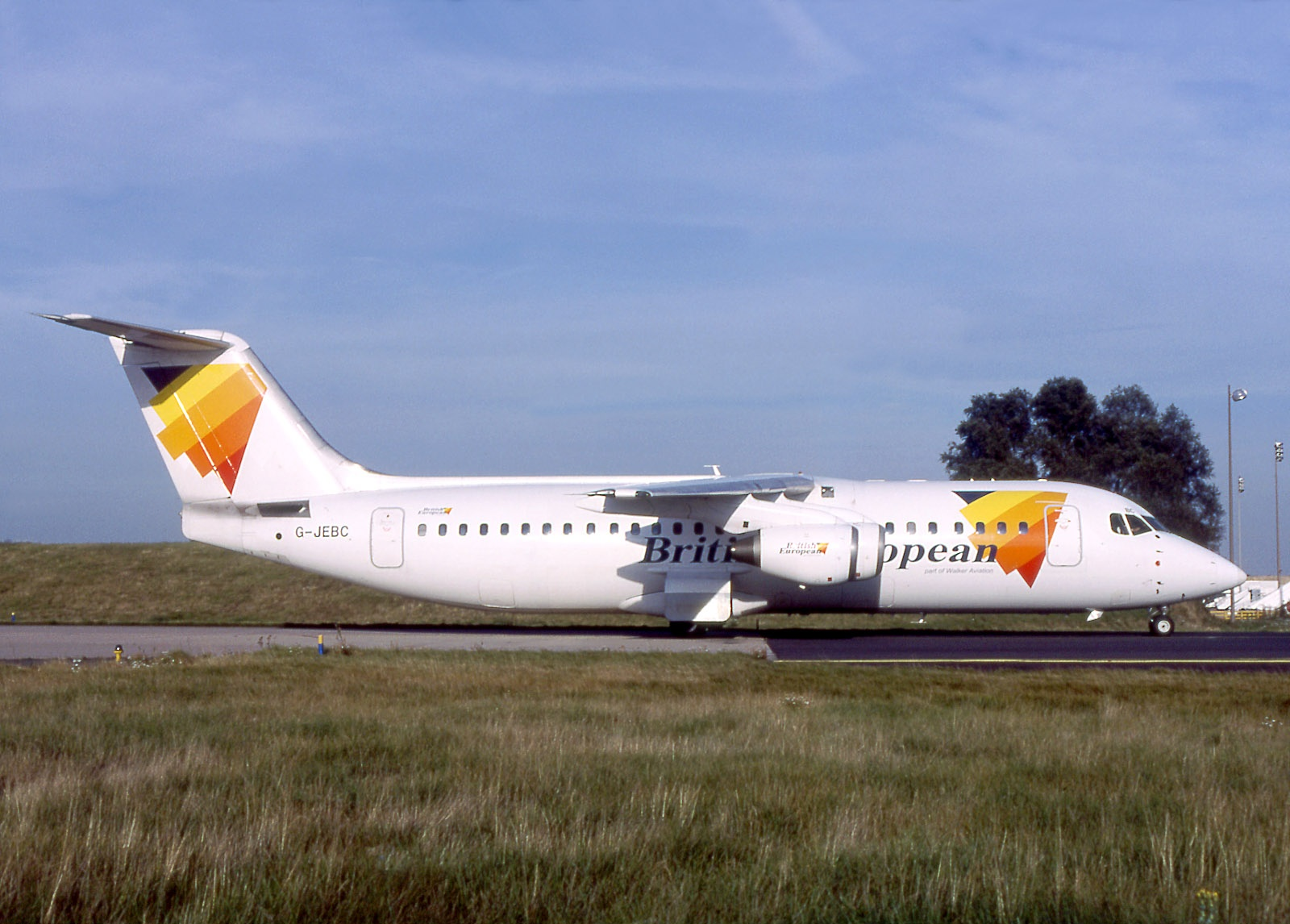
- The aircraft involved in the accident while still in service with British European in 2000
- Aircraft type: British Aerospace 146-300
- Operator: Aviastar
- Registration: PK-BRD
- Flight origin: Sentani Airport, Jayapura, Indonesia
- Destination: Wamena Airport, Wamena, Indonesia
- Occupants: 6
- Passengers: 0
- Crew: 6
- Fatalities: 6
- Survivors: 0

The 2009 Aviastar British Aerospace 146 crash occurred on April 9, 2009, when a British Aerospace 146 (BAe 146) crashed into Pikei Hill during a ferry flight from Sentani Airport to Wamena Airport, both in Indonesia's Papua province. All 6 crew members were killed. The aircraft was carrying voting paper to Wamena as well as several other goods, as a parliamentary election was held in the month. The wreckage was found in Pikei Hill, Tengah Mountain, Tangma, Yahukimo District.

The accident was the first fatal crash for Aviastar and was the second airliner crash in Indonesia within a week, after an Indonesian Air Force Fokker 27 crashed into a hangar at Bandung on 6 April, killing all 24 people on board.

A final report by the National Transportation Safety Committee (NTSC) concluded that the crash was due to Controlled Flight Into Terrain (CFIT) resulting from pilot error. The Captain ignored the ground proximity warning after the First Officer had warned him many times as he became anxious about how the Captain was handling the aircraft.

== Accident ==
The BAe 146-300, registered PK-BRD, was being operated by Aviastar on a ferry flight from Sentani Airport, Jayapura to Wamena Airport, Wamena. The crew consisted of two pilots, Captain Sigit Triwahyono, was the pilot in charge, along with first officer Lukman Yusuf. Also on board were two flight attendants, a flight engineer, and a load master.

The flight was being operated under Instrument Flight Rules (IFR) from Sentani, and a visual descent, approach, and landing at Wamena, because there was no published instrument approach procedure at Wamena. There was low cloud on the final approach track to Runway 15 at Wamena. The aircraft was observed conducting a low altitude go-around over the runway: it then climbed to a low height along the extended centre-line to the south east, before making a right turn onto the downwind leg of the circuit. As it began its second approach into Wamena Airport, it hit Pikei Hill in Tengah Mountain at 07:43 local time (10:43 UTC). All on board were killed instantly.

== Aircraft ==
The aircraft involved in the accident, manufactured in 1990 and registered as PK-BRD with serial number E3189, was a BAe 146 Series 300. Originally built as a passenger aircraft, Aviastar modified the aircraft into a combined passenger and cargo configuration in September 2008. At the time of the accident, the aircraft had accumulated over 22,000 flying hours.

The aircraft was in the 42-passenger and cargo configuration. However, the weight chart used for the accident flight was for the aircraft in a 110-passenger configuration. That was therefore the incorrect chart.

== Passengers and crew ==
Because the aircraft was conducting a ferry flight there were no passengers; on board were six crew members who all were Indonesian. The Captain was 56-year-old Sigit Triwahyono, who had a total flying experience of more than 8,300 hours, of which 1000 were on the BAe146. The First Officer was 49-year-old Lukman Yusuf, with a total flying experience of over 12,400 hours, 200 on the BAe146.

== Investigation ==
The investigation was conducted by the National Transportation Safety Committee. At the time of the accident, the weather in Wamena was calm, with slight haze and broken clouds surrounding the area. Visibility was 8 km. The weather was not a factor in the crash. Investigators retrieved both the Flight Data Recorder and Cockpit Voice Recorder. Both had good quality data. Based on the analysis of the flight recorders, investigators then reconstructed the chronological order as follows:

At its first attempt to land, the runway in Wamena was obscured by low clouds. Knowing that they couldn't fly the aircraft to the established flight path for an approach, the crew abandoned the approach and started a go around to the right at a low height, approx 46 m (150 ft). While on the right circuit down-wind leg, the enhanced ground proximity warning system (EGPWS) warning sounded, eight of them were "Don't sink", two "Too low terrain", two "Bank Angle" and one "Terrain Terrain" voice aural alerts. The flight crew did not respond to any of those alerts. First Officer Lukman became really concerned with Captain Sigit's handling of the aircraft. He later said "be careful, Sir" to Captain Sigit.

The aircraft then increased its bank angle to the right. First Officer Lukman became really anxious, saying "Sir Sir Sir open Sir left left". Shortly afterwards Captain Sigit banked the aircraft to the left. The "Don't sink" alert sounded for the second time. The bank angle to the left became extreme, exceeding 40°. The aircraft also entered a 10-degree nose down pitch attitude. First Officer Lukman then warned Captain Sigit "don't sink". In repeating the words "don't sink", First Officer Lukman was alerting Captain Sigit to comply with the EGPWS voice aural alert "Don't sink, don't sink". Captain Sigit immediately responded "ya, ya".

Three seconds later, Lukman urgently commanded "left turn". The EGPWS voice alert then sounded, "Too low, terrain", "bank angle, bank angle" "terrain – terrain" warning. At the same time, First Officer called to Captain Sigit "sir! sir! sir!". The aircraft then impacted the ground.

NTSC noted that there was not good crew resource management throughout the flight. Neither pilot was trained sufficiently in handling the aircraft when the EGPWS warning alert sounded. The Company Operations Manual (COM) specified that the crew briefing should be updated if changing circumstances so required. Captain Sigit did update the briefing when the first approach was discontinued and the go-around was conducted. Captain Sigit's disregard of the EGPWS alerts that sounded as the aircraft was being maneuvered was in non-conformance with the instructions for crew response to EGPWS alerts and cautions, as published in the COM. That, together with their lack of flight crew training in EGPWS, meant that they had not been properly prepared to respond in a timely and appropriate manner to the alerts and warnings provided by the EGPWS. Had Captain Sigit executed the appropriate responses to those EGPWS alerts it is unlikely that the crash would have occurred.

Neither flight crew member conformed to the instructions about flight crew responsibilities during a visual approach, as published in the COM. This resulted in their being unable to assure the safety of flight at low level while manoeuvring the aircraft in proximity with terrain in conditions of reduced visibility. Had they more carefully planned the second approach, and closely cooperated with each other, they may have achieved a safe approach and landing. Their disregard of the published procedures bypassed the safety criteria and inbuilt risk treatments in the design of those procedures.

== See also ==
- Mount Salak Sukhoi Superjet 100 crash
- Santa Barbara Airlines Flight 518
- 2008 Conviasa Boeing 737 crash
