= 2008 Conviasa Boeing 737 crash =

Aviation accident in Ecuador

Conviasa ferry flight
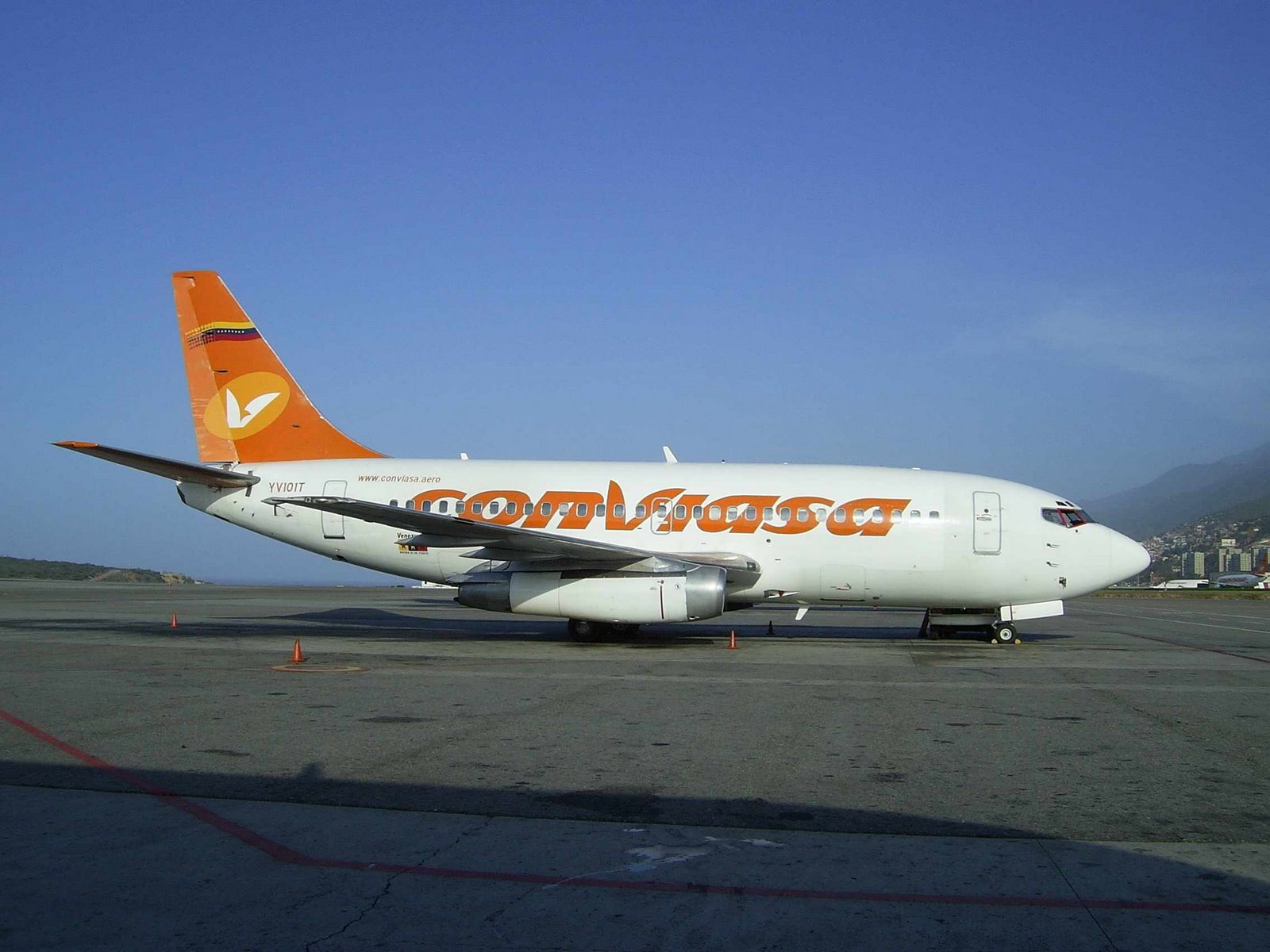
- YV101T, the sister ship to the aircraft involved

Accident
- Date: 30 August 2008
- Summary: Controlled flight into terrain due to pilot error
- Site: Illiniza Volcano, Ecuador; 0°39′34″S 78°42′49″W

Aircraft
- Aircraft type: Boeing 737-291 Advanced
- Operator: Conviasa
- Registration: YV102T
- Flight origin: Simón Bolívar International Airport, Maiquetía, Venezuela
- Destination: Cotopaxi International Airport, Latacunga, Ecuador
- Occupants: 3
- Passengers: 0
- Crew: 3
- Fatalities: 3
- Survivors: 0

A Conviasa Boeing 737-200 (registered as YV102T) ferry flight from Maiquetia, Venezuela to Latacunga, Ecuador crashed into Illiniza Volcano. The aircraft had been stored at Caracas and was being ferried to a new owner. There were three crew on board with no passengers. There were no survivors.

== Aircraft ==
The aircraft involved was powered by two Pratt & Whitney JT8D-17A engines and was originally delivered on July 6, 1978 to Frontier Airlines. It was later sold to United Airlines and then to Atlantic Airlines de Honduras before acquired by Conviasa in 2007.

== Investigation and final report ==
The accident was investigated by the Dirección General de Aviación Civil (DGAC) of Ecuador. The investigation spanned 622 days following the incident and the final report was released on May 14, 2010. The findings of the report were as follows (translated from Spanish):

"The Accident Investigation Board judges that the probable cause of this accident was non-observance by the flight crew of the technical procedures, configuration, speed and bank angle of the aircraft required to complete the initial turn of Instrument Approach Procedure Number 4 published in the Ecuador Aeronautical Information Publication (AIP) for Latacunga airport, a failure that placed the aircraft outside of the protected area (published pattern), bringing it into high elevation mountainous terrain."

The report also listed the crew's ignorance of the area surrounding the approach path and lack of airline documentation and procedures governing the conduct of flights to non-scheduled and special airports.

== See also ==
- 2009 Aviastar British Aerospace 146 crash
