= Malangke =

- District
- Flag
- Interactive map of Malangke

Population
  - Total: 28,958
- Ministry of Home Affairs Code: 73.22.01

Malangke is a town in the North Luwu Regency, South Sulawesi, Indonesia. Strategically located on the coastal plain of the Gulf of Bone, of Sulawesi it was the palace centre of the ancient Kingdom of Luwu before the capital was relocated to Palopo in the early seventeenth century.
