= Tanjung Api Airport =

Airport in Indonesia

Tanjung Api Airport Bandar Udara Tanjung Api
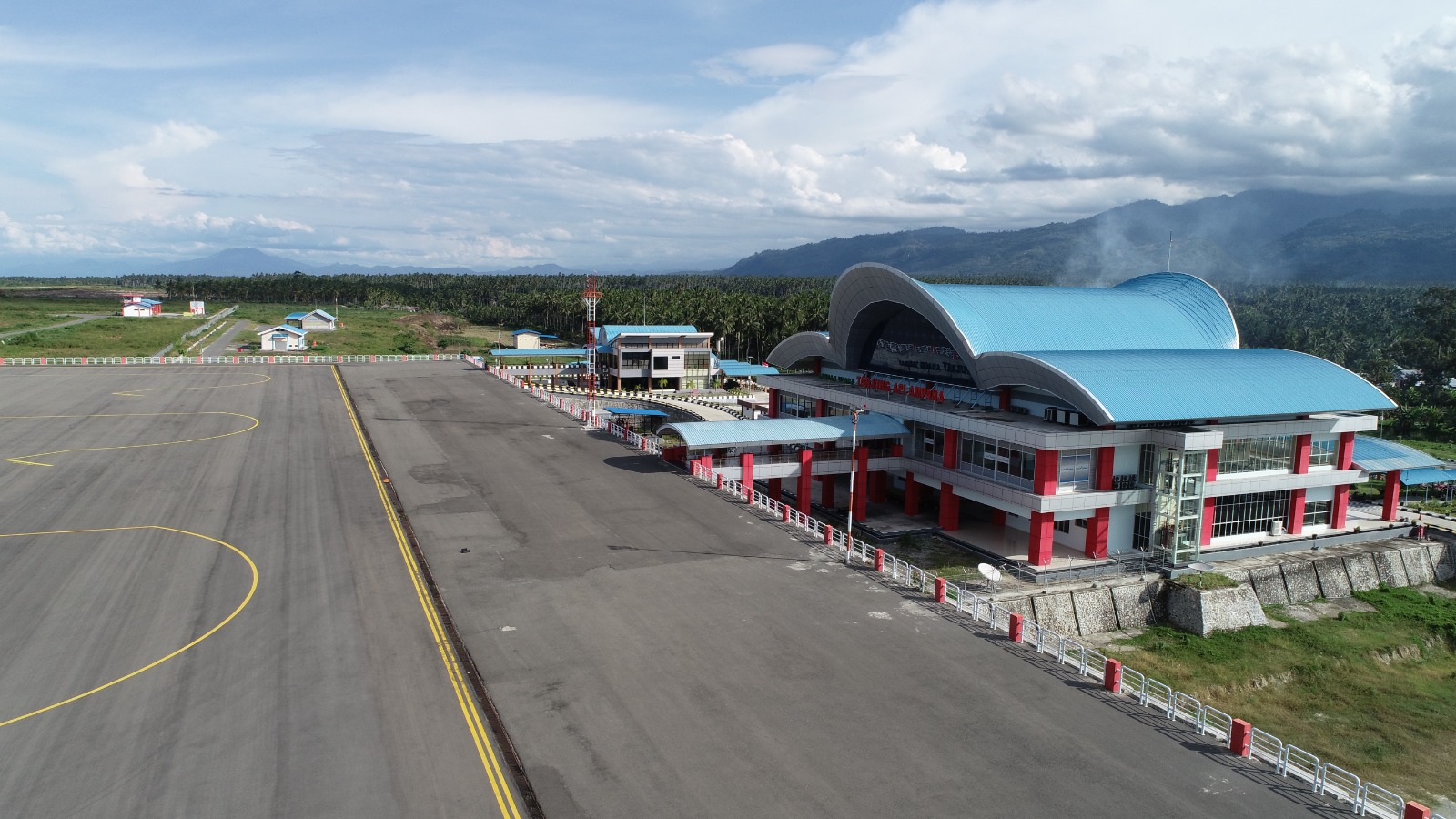
- IATA: OJU; ICAO: WAFU

Summary
- Airport type: Public
- Owner: Government of Indonesia
- Operator: Directorate General of Civil Aviation
- Serves: Ampana
- Location: Ampana Tete District, Tojo Una-Una Regency, Central Sulawesi, Sulawesi Island, Indonesia
- Time zone: WITA (UTC+08:00)
- Elevation AMSL: 15 m (49 ft)
- Coordinates: 0°51′51.9″S 121°37′23.1″E

Map
- Location of the airport in Sulawesi

Runways
Direction	Length		Surface
Direction	m	ft	Surface
12/30	2,110	6,923	Asphalt

Statistics (2024)
- Passengers: 2,112 (▼1.1%)
- Cargo (tonnes): N/A
- Aircraft movements: 216 (▼2.3%)
- Source: DGCA

Tanjung Api Airport (IATA: OJU, ICAO: WAFU) is a domestic regional airport serving Ampana, the administrative capital of Tojo Una-Una Regency, in the province of Central Sulawesi, on the island of Sulawesi, Indonesia. The airport is located in Ampana Tete District, approximately 5 km (3.1 mi) from the center of Ampana. It serves as an important gateway to Ampana and the wider Tojo Una-Una Regency, as well as the Togean Islands, a popular tourist destination in Central Sulawesi. The airport currently serves only pioneer flight routes, with a single scheduled route to Palu, the provincial capital of Central Sulawesi. The route is operated by Susi Air. In the past, Ampana was served by several other airlines and had more extensive air connectivity. Wings Air previously operated flights to Ampana, including a route to Palu, while Citilink previously operated a route connecting Ampana with Makassar in South Sulawesi. Both services have since been discontinued.

== History ==
=== Background and construction ===
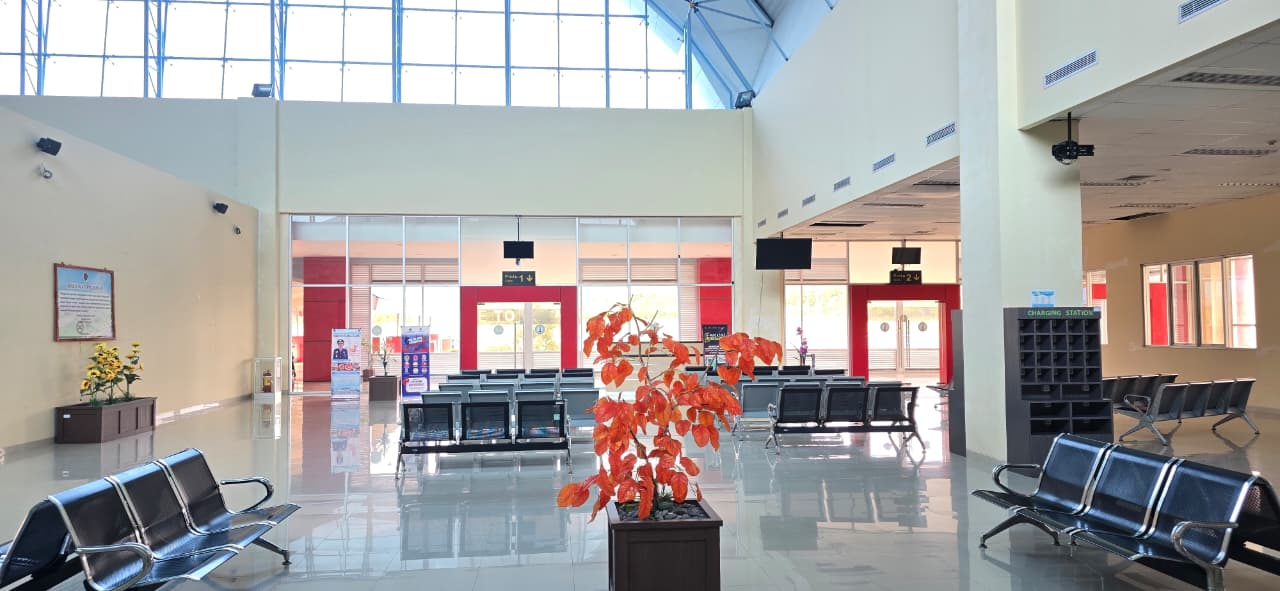
Boarding gate

The construction of Tanjung Api Airport was proposed during the administration of Damsik Ladjalani, who served as Regent of Tojo Una-Una Regency from 2005 to 2015. Ladjalani proposed the establishment of an airport in the regency to improve accessibility and facilitate travel to and from the area. At the time, access to Tojo Una-Una Regency was relatively difficult, particularly from the provincial capital, Palu. The overland journey between Palu and Ampana could take approximately ten hours, underscoring the need for a faster and more convenient mode of transportation.

Funding for the development of the airport was allocated beginning in 2006, with a total budget of approximately Rp84 billion provided through the Tojo Una-Una Regency Regional Budget over the 2006–2014 period. In 2007, then-Minister of Transportation Jusman Syafii Djamal issued a Minister of Transportation Regulation approving a change in the proposed location of Tanjung Api Airport. The original site was planned in Labuan Village, within Ampana City District, but the proposal was subsequently abandoned due to difficulties in acquiring the required land. Following further assessment and site evaluation, a new location was selected in Pusungi Village, Ampana Tete District, where the airport was ultimately developed.

Groundbreaking for the construction of the airport took place on 24 April 2010, in a ceremony witnessed by Damsik Ladjalani. Initial construction focused on the development of the runway and other essential airside infrastructure, while construction of the passenger terminal did not begin until 2014. On 19 December 2014, then-Minister of Transportation Ignasius Jonan inaugurated 20 ports and 10 airports across Indonesia as part of efforts to improve inter-island connectivity and expand access to air and sea transportation. Tanjung Api Airport was among the airports inaugurated under the program. Jonan said that the ten airports would serve pioneer flights with the capacity to be landed by ATR 72 and Cessna 208 Caravan aircraft. He added that the entire source of funding came from the government and regional budget.

Despite its inauguration, the airport was still not ready to commence commercial operations by the end of 2014. The airport only commenced commercial operations on 20 May 2015, when a Cessna aircraft made the first landing at the airport.

=== Contemporary history ===
Despite the commencement of operations, construction had not yet been fully completed, with the passenger terminal and several other facilities still under construction at the time. Nevertheless, airlines soon began establishing scheduled services to Ampana. Aviastar was among the first carriers to do so, introducing four weekly flights connecting Ampana with Palu and Gorontalo. Following several delays, construction of the passenger terminal was finally completed in October 2016. The newly completed terminal was subsequently inaugurated by then-President Joko Widodo on 19 October 2016.

When the airport commenced commercial operations in 2015, several potential routes were proposed to improve air connectivity between Ampana and other cities in Sulawesi, including Palu, Makassar, Gorontalo, and Luwuk. At the time, Garuda Indonesia was also reportedly interested in establishing a direct route from Ampana to Denpasar, Bali, which would have provided the airport with its first connection outside Sulawesi.

On 13 October 2016, Wings Air inaugurated its Ampana–Palu route, operating the service with ATR 72-600 aircraft. The route was subsequently discontinued on 3 October 2019 due to significant financial losses. After a six-year hiatus, Wings Air resumed the service on 22 March 2025. However, the route was discontinued again only a few months later, in May 2025, reportedly due to low passenger demand.

On 25 November 2020, Citilink inaugurated a new route connecting Ampana with Makassar, operated with ATR 72-600 aircraft. The route was also short-lived and was discontinued in 2021 amid the COVID-19 pandemic. The pandemic severely affected air travel demand, leaving the airport with virtually no scheduled commercial services, although it remained open and operational. Despite this, Susi Air launched a pioneer route connecting Ampana and Palu on 2 January 2023, restoring scheduled air connectivity between the two cities. As of 2026, Susi Air continues to operate the route twice weekly and remains the sole airline providing scheduled commercial services at the airport.

== Facilities and development ==
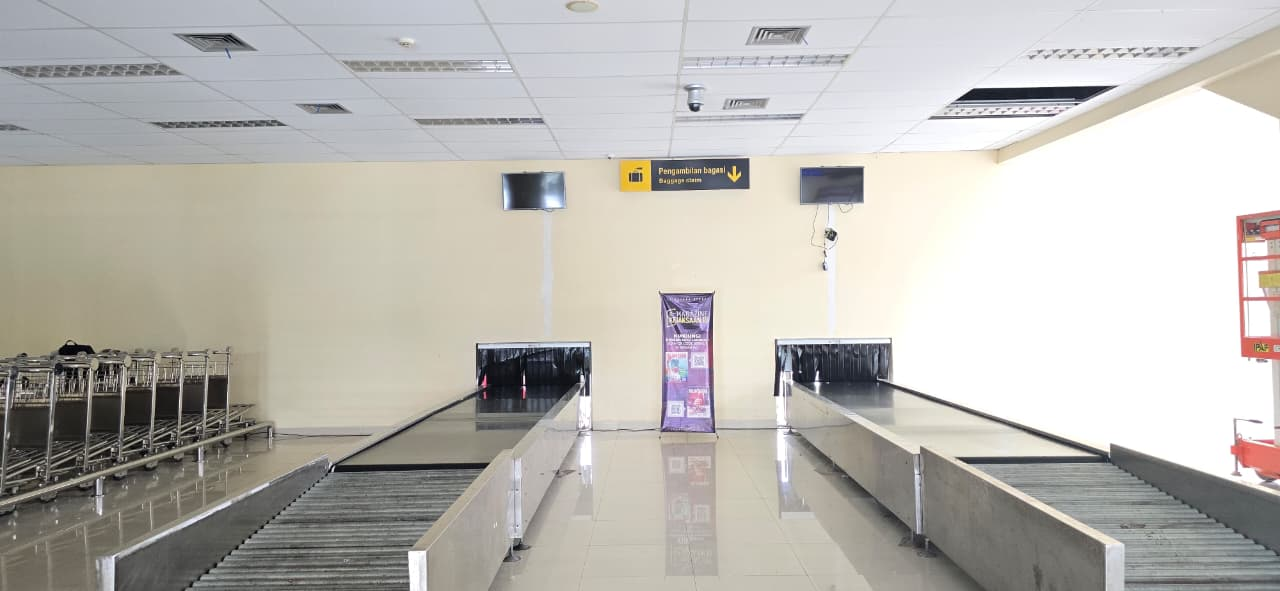
Baggage claim area

The airport was developed on a site spanning approximately 230 hectares of land. The two-story passenger terminal features a distinctive architectural design inspired by the maleo, a bird native to and commonly found in the Tojo Una-Una region. The terminal has a total floor area of approximately 1,000 m², with the check-in counters located on the first floor and the departure gates on the second floor. The passenger terminal is equipped with a range of basic passenger facilities, including check-in counters, departure gates capable of handling up to 200 passengers during peak periods, a baggage claim area, a smoking room, a lactation room, a children's playground, a lost-and-found service, a VIP room, a dedicated facility for passengers with disabilities, a prayer room, and an information desk. In addition to the passenger terminal, the airport is also equipped with a dedicated cargo terminal to support air freight operations.

The airport has a single runway measuring 2,110 m × 30 m, which was extended from its original length of 1,850 m during construction works carried out between 2016 and 2017. The extended runway enables the airport to accommodate narrow-body aircraft such as the Boeing 737 and Airbus A320, although the airport currently handles only smaller pioneer aircraft, such as the Cessna 208 Grand Caravan. The runway is also equipped with Runway End Safety Areas (RESAs) at both ends, each measuring 90 m × 60 m, providing additional safety space beyond the runway ends. The runway is also planned to be widened by 15 m, from 30 m to 45 m, in the future to enhance its operational capability and potentially accommodate larger aircraft. In addition to the runway, the airport has a single taxiway measuring 188 m × 23 m and a single aircraft apron measuring 200 m × 82 m. The apron is equipped with three aircraft parking stands.

== Airlines and destinations ==
Airlines	Destinations
Susi Air	Palu

== Statistics ==
Annual passenger numbers and aircraft statistics
Year	Passengers handled	Passenger % change	Cargo (tonnes)	Cargo % change	Aircraft movements	Aircraft % change
2015	1,942	Steady	N/A	Steady	342	Steady
2016	8,453	▲335.3	66.52	Steady	666	▲94.7
2017	30,735	▲263.6	N/A	Steady	726	▲9.0
2018	24,426	▼20.5	N/A	Steady	640	▼11.8
2019	10,260	▼58.0	N/A	Steady	364	▼43.1
2020	317	▼96.9	N/A	Steady	30	▼91.8
2021	1,750	▲452.1	N/A	Steady	228	▲660.0
2022	592	▼66.2	N/A	Steady	102	▼55.3
2023	2,135	▲260.6	N/A	Steady	221	▲116.7
2024	2,112	▼1.1	N/A	Steady	216	▼2.3
^{Source: DGCA, BPS}
