= Ampana =

- Town
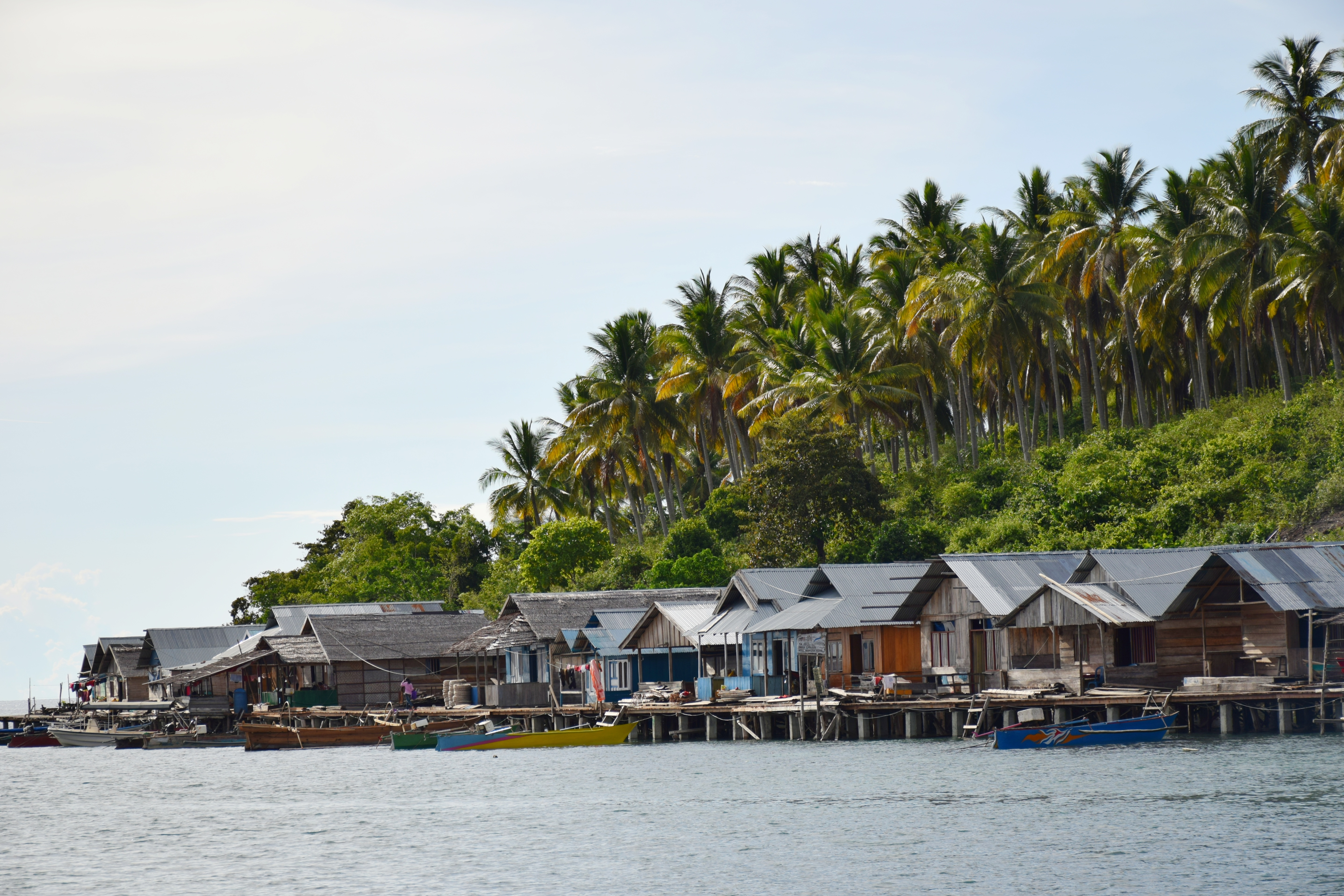

- Location within Sulawesi
- Coordinates: 0°52′S 121°35′E
- Country: Indonesia
- Province: Central Sulawesi
- Regency: Tojo Una-Una Regency

Population (2010)
  - Total: 40,299
- Time zone: UTC+8 (+8)

Ampana is a town and the administrative centre of the Tojo Una-Una Regency, in Central Sulawesi Province of Indonesia. Ampana is located in the middle between Poso and Luwuk.

== Transportation ==
The city is served by the Tanjung Api Airport (IATA: OJU).

== Climate ==
Ampana has a tropical rainforest climate (Af) with moderate rainfall in December and January and heavy rainfall in the remaining months.

Climate data for Ampana
Month	Jan	Feb	Mar	Apr	May	Jun	Jul	Aug	Sep	Oct	Nov	Dec	Year
Mean daily maximum °C (°F)	30.8 (87.4)	30.9 (87.6)	31.1 (88.0)	31.4 (88.5)	31.3 (88.3)	30.5 (86.9)	30.0 (86.0)	31.0 (87.8)	31.4 (88.5)	32.4 (90.3)	32.0 (89.6)	31.3 (88.3)	31.2 (88.1)
Daily mean °C (°F)	26.9 (80.4)	27.0 (80.6)	27.1 (80.8)	27.3 (81.1)	27.4 (81.3)	26.7 (80.1)	26.1 (79.0)	26.7 (80.1)	26.8 (80.2)	27.6 (81.7)	27.6 (81.7)	27.2 (81.0)	27.0 (80.7)
Mean daily minimum °C (°F)	23.0 (73.4)	23.1 (73.6)	23.1 (73.6)	23.2 (73.8)	23.6 (74.5)	23.0 (73.4)	22.3 (72.1)	22.5 (72.5)	22.3 (72.1)	22.8 (73.0)	23.2 (73.8)	23.2 (73.8)	22.9 (73.3)
Average rainfall mm (inches)	109 (4.3)	133 (5.2)	164 (6.5)	225 (8.9)	273 (10.7)	279 (11.0)	272 (10.7)	200 (7.9)	168 (6.6)	137 (5.4)	140 (5.5)	123 (4.8)	2,223 (87.5)
Source: Climate-Data.org
