= Aviastar (Indonesia) =

Indonesian airline

IATA	ICAO	Call sign
MV	VIT	AVIASTAR
- Founded: 2003; 23 years ago
- Ceased operations: 2022
- Operating bases: Soekarno-Hatta International Airport; Ngurah Rai International Airport; Sultan Hasanuddin International Airport; Tjilik Riwut Airport; Sultan Aji Muhammad Sulaiman Airport; Nabire Airport
- Fleet size: 4
- Destinations: 30
- Headquarters: East Jakarta, Jakarta, Indonesia
- Key people: Sugeng Triyono (Chairman); M. Sundoro (President and CEO)
- Website: aviastarmandiri.com/aviastar

PT Aviastar Mandiri, operating as Aviastar was an Indonesian passenger airline based in East Jakarta, Jakarta, Indonesia.

== History ==
The airline was established on 12 June 2000 by Capt. Sugeng Triyono and his 4 colleagues which started as helicopter charter services company with various leased helicopters. Since 2003 Aviastar began operating fix wing aircraft with 2 units of DeHavilland Canada DHC-6-300 Twin Otters and began to drop its rotary wings operations.

Aviastar now is an established company dealing with air transportation services either for chartered flights or schedule flights and currently operates 4 units of DHC-6-300 and 3 units of BAe 146-200 with plan to order 3 units more of DHC-6-300 to add in its fleet before end of 2013.

Its main operation base is located in Jakarta (CGK) with other operation bases in Palangkaraya (PKY), Balikpapan (BPN), Makassar (UPG), Nabire (NBX) and Denpasar (DPS).

Since 2022, Aviastar has ceased operations and its website has been down.

== Destinations ==
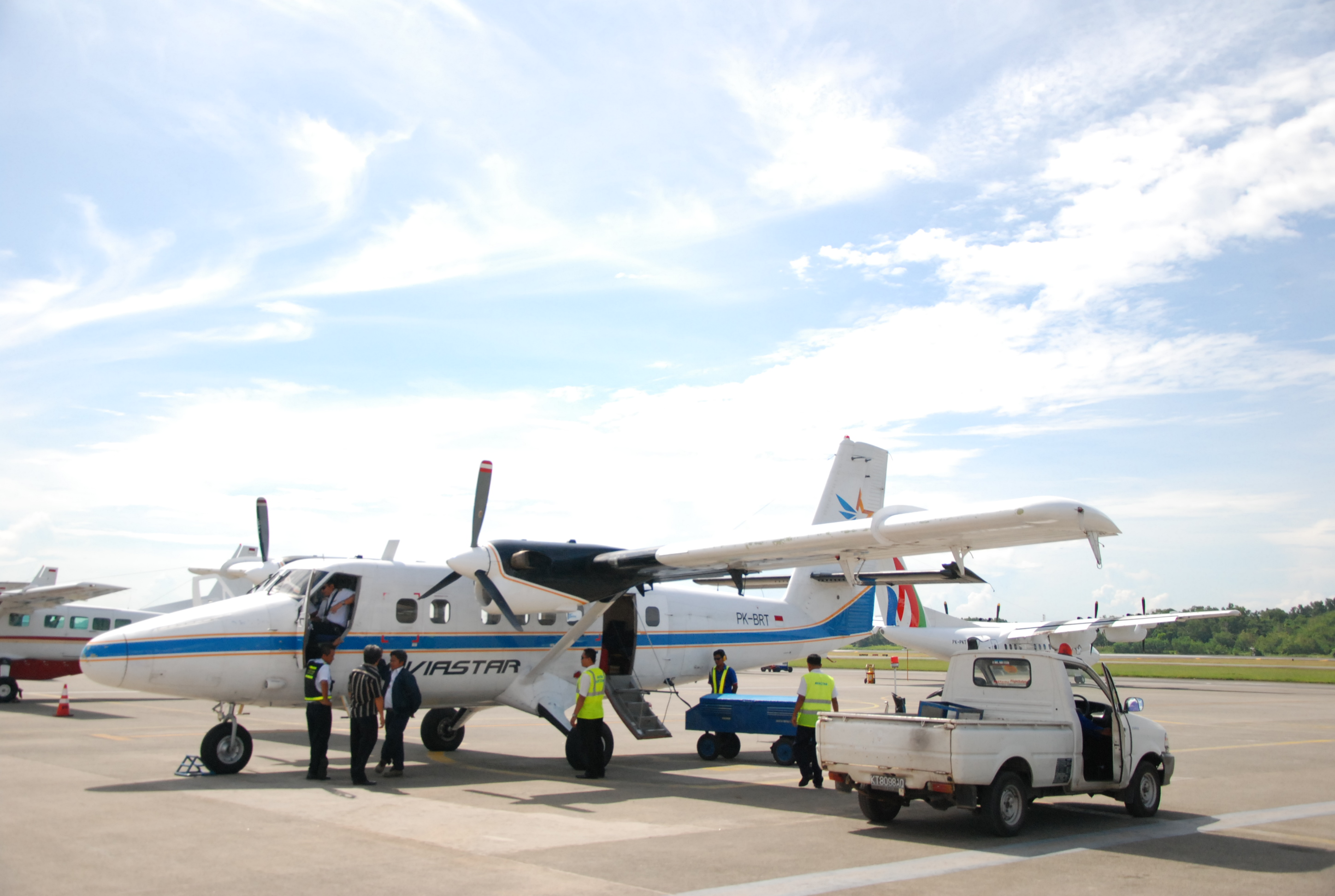
Aviastar DHC-6-300 at Halim Perdanakusuma Airport in 2012

Aviastar serves 36 routes in commercial and government subsidiary pioneer flights prior to the end of operation.

== Fleet ==
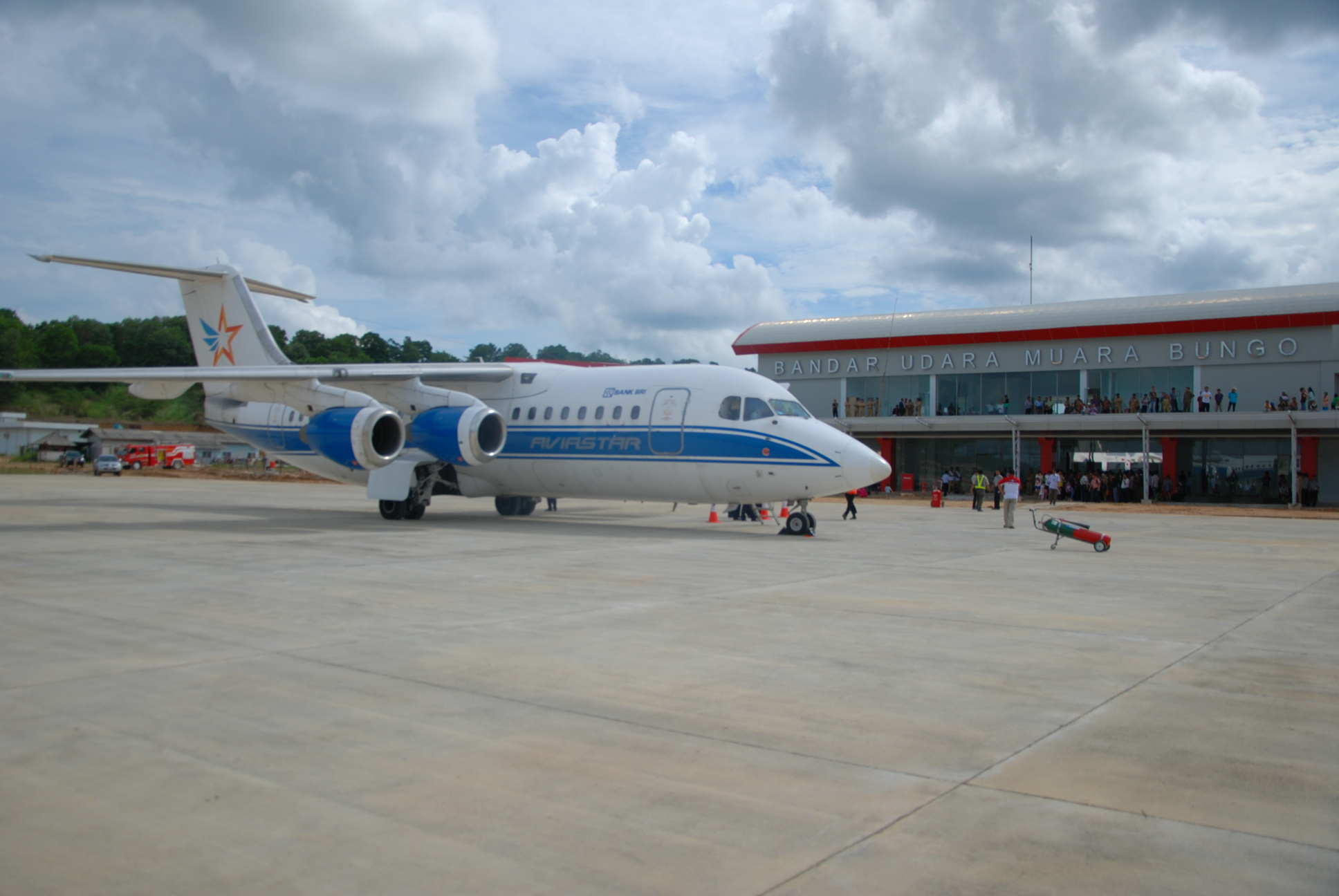
Aviastar BAe 146-200 at Muara Bungo Airport in 2012

=== Current fleet ===
The Aviastar fleet consists of the following aircraft (as of August 2019):

Aviastar Fleet
Aircraft	In service	Orders	Notes
De Havilland Canada DHC-6-300 Twin Otter	4		

=== Former fleet ===
The airline previously operated the following aircraft (as of August 2017):

- 3 British Aerospace 146-200
- 1 further De Havilland Canada DHC-6-300 Twin Otter

== Accidents and incidents ==
- On 9 April 2009, an Aviastar BAe 146-300 PK-BRD, crashed to a mountain near Wamena, Papua, Indonesia, after a failed second approach for landing at Wamena Airport.
- On 2 October 2015, an Aviastar DHC-6 Twin Otter, registered as PK-BRM, operating Aviastar Flight 7503 with three crew members and seven passengers on board, crashed near Palopo 11 minutes after takeoff. The passengers were 4 adults, 2 children, and 1 baby. There were no survivors.
