= Masamba =

- District and town
- Location in Sulawesi Masamba (Indonesia)
- Coordinates: 2°33′11″S 120°19′39″E
- Country: Indonesia
- Province: South Sulawesi
- Regency: North Luwu Regency

Area
  - Total: 1,068.85 km^{2} (412.69 sq mi)

Population (mid 2023 estimate)
  - Total: 39,266
  - Density: 36.737/km^{2} (95.148/sq mi)
- Time zone: UTC+8 (WITA)
- Postal code: 92912 ‒ 92961
- Area code: 0473

Masamba is a small river town and district (kecamatan) in the North Luwu Regency of South Sulawesi Province of Indonesia which serves as the seat of the regency. The town lies on the Patikala River. It is served by Andi Jemma Airport. The district covers an area of 1,068.85 km^{2} and had a population of 38,024 at the 2020 Census; the official estimate as at mid 2023 was 39,266 (comprising 19,481 males and 19,785 females). Much of the land in the region is swampy coastal plains with mangroves found in its shallow waters.

A population of Bugis who are known to be Muslims come from Masamba. A number of these Islamic Bugis moved out of the village into Rompu in the 1940s and into the lowlands of the region into Tabalu and Saatu in the 1950s and 1960s. Rattan trading and making is said to be important to the local economy. Coconuts are also grown near the coast in this region of Sulawesi.

== Villages ==
There are 19 villages in Masamba District, of which 4 are classed as urban kelurahan and 15 are classed as rural desa. These are listed below (with their populations as at mid 2022).

- Baloli (or Balebo) (1,445)
- Baliase (kelurahan)(3,609)
- Bone (kelurahan)(5,249)
- Kamiri (1,431)
- Kappuna (kelurahan)(6,110)
- Kasimbong/Bone Tua (kelurahan)(5,371)
- Laba (2,213)
- Lantang Tallang (1,219)
- Lapapa (1,075)
- Mapi/Lero (796)
- Masamba (994)
- Pandak (1,471)
- Pincara (601)
- Pombakka (1,221)
- Pongo (1,662)
- Rompu (1,630)
- Sepakat (1,945)
- Sumilin (Simillin) (399)
- Torada (Toradda) (537)

== Climate ==
Masamba has a tropical rainforest climate (Af) with moderate rainfall in September and October and heavy to very heavy rainfall in the remaining months.

Climate data for Masamba
Month	Jan	Feb	Mar	Apr	May	Jun	Jul	Aug	Sep	Oct	Nov	Dec	Year
Mean daily maximum °C (°F)	27.7 (81.9)	27.9 (82.2)	28.0 (82.4)	28.0 (82.4)	27.8 (82.0)	27.0 (80.6)	26.4 (79.5)	27.5 (81.5)	28.0 (82.4)	29.2 (84.6)	28.7 (83.7)	28.0 (82.4)	27.9 (82.1)
Daily mean °C (°F)	23.8 (74.8)	24.0 (75.2)	24.1 (75.4)	24.1 (75.4)	24.1 (75.4)	23.5 (74.3)	22.7 (72.9)	23.4 (74.1)	23.6 (74.5)	24.5 (76.1)	24.4 (75.9)	24.0 (75.2)	23.8 (74.9)
Mean daily minimum °C (°F)	22.2 (72.0)	22.2 (72.0)	22.7 (72.9)	22.6 (72.7)	22.9 (73.2)	20.0 (68.0)	19.0 (66.2)	19.3 (66.7)	19.2 (66.6)	19.8 (67.6)	20.1 (68.2)	20.1 (68.2)	20.8 (69.5)
Average rainfall mm (inches)	259 (10.2)	247 (9.7)	295 (11.6)	397 (15.6)	287 (11.3)	209 (8.2)	157 (6.2)	133 (5.2)	104 (4.1)	117 (4.6)	225 (8.9)	288 (11.3)	2,718 (106.9)
Source: Climate-Data.org
