= North Luwu Regency =

Regency in South Sulawesi, Indonesia

Coordinates: 2°36′S 120°15′E

North Luwu Regency Kabupaten Luwu Utara
- Regency
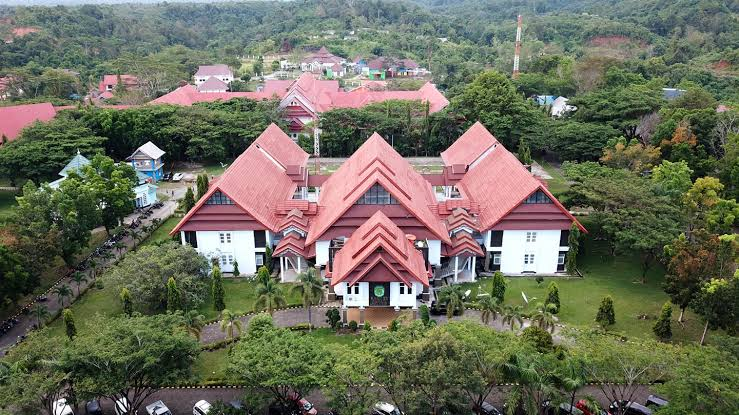
- North Luwu Regent's Office

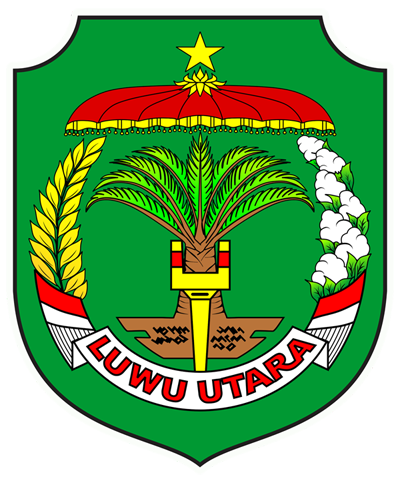
- Coat of arms
- Motto: Luwu Utara Indah Mendunia (North Luwu to Beautiful Worldwide)
- Location within South Sulawesi
- Country: Indonesia
- Province: South Sulawesi
- Capital: Masamba

Government
  - Regent: Andi Abdullah Rahim
  - Vice Regent: Jumail Mappile

Area
  - Total: 7,502.58 km^{2} (2,896.76 sq mi)

Population (mid 2025 estimate)
  - Total: 337,080
  - Density: 44.929/km^{2} (116.36/sq mi)
- Time zone: UTC+7 (WIB)
- Area code: +62 473

North Luwu Regency is a regency of South Sulawesi Province of Indonesia. It was created on 20 April 1999 by separation of the province's northern districts formerly within the Luwu Regency; however on 25 February 2003 it was reduced when the easternmost of these same districts were split off to create the East Luwu Regency. It now covers 7,502.58 km^{2} and had a population of 287,606 at the 2010 census and 322,919 at the 2020 census; the official estimate as at mid 2025 was 337,080 (comprising 170,144 males and 166,936 females). The principal town lies at Masamba.

== History ==
In 1999, during the early days of the Reform movement across the Republic of Indonesia, Law No. 22 of 1999 concerning Regional Government was enacted, changing the governance mechanism towards Regional Autonomy.

Specifically, on February 10, 1999, the Luwu Regency DPRD issued Decree No. 03/Kpts/DPRD/II/1999 regarding the Proposal and Approval of the Expansion of the Luwu Dati II Regency, which was divided into two regencies. Subsequently, the Governor of South Sulawesi followed up with Decree No. 136/776/OTODA dated February 12, 1999. Finally, on April 20, 1999, North Luwu Regency was established as stipulated in the Republic of Indonesia Law No. 13 of 1999.

== Administrative districts ==
North Luwu Regency in 2010 comprised eleven administrative Districts (Kecamatan), but subsequently four further districts have been added by the division of existing districts. These fifteen districts are tabulated below with their areas and their populations at the 2010 census and the 2020 census, together with the official estimates as at mid 2025. The table also includes the locations of the district administrative centres, the numbers of administrative villages in each district (totalling 7 urban kelurahan and 166 rural desa), and its post code.

Kode Wilayah	Name of District (kecamatan)	Area in km^{2}	Pop'n census 2010	Pop'n census 2020	Pop'n estimate mid 2025	Admin centre	No. of villages	Post code
73.22.04	Sabbang	424.11	34,839	18,008	18,967	Marobo	10 ^{(a)}	92955
73.22.15	Sabbang Selatan (South Sabbang)	100.97	^{(b)}	22,227	22,910	Boangin	10	92955
73.22.11	Baebunta	203.16	43,068	31,798	34,012	Salassa	11 ^{(a)}	92965
73.22.14	Baebunta Selatan (South Baebunta)	92.09	^{(c)}	16,005	16,525	Lara	10	92965
73.22.01	Malangke	229.70	27,005	28,852	28,655	Tolada	14	92953
73.22.08	Malangke Barat (West Malangke)	214.05	23,512	25,014	24,748	Pao / Ammassangan	13	92957
73.22.06	Sukamaju	208.21	40,780	27,965	29,363	Sulamaju	14	92963
73.22.13	Sukamaju Selatan (South Sukamaju)	47.27	^{(d)}	18,031	19,270	Mulyorejo	11	92963
73.22.02	Bone-Bone	127.92	45,862	27,597	27,925	Bone-Bone	11 ^{(a)}	92966
73.22.12	Tanalili	149.41	^{(e)}	24,713	26,372	Bungapati	10	92967
73.22.03	Masamba	1,068.85	31,237	38,024	40,023	Kappuna	19 ^{(f)}	92961 ^{(g)}
73.22.10	Mappedeceng	275.50	21,925	24,713	25,945	Cendana Putih II	15	92917
73.22.09	Rampi	1,565.65	2,860	3,124	3,537	Onondowa	6	92964
73.22.05	Limbong (or Rongkong)	686.50	3,824	3,843	4,101	Limbong	7	92954
73.22.07	Seko	2,109.19	12,560	12,997	14,727	Padang Balua	12	92956
	Totals	7,502.58	287,472	322,919	337,080	Masamba	173	

Notes: (a) including one kelurahan (the district administrative centre)
(b) the 2010 population of the new Sabbang Selatan District is included in the figure for Selatan District.
(c) the 2010 population of the new Baebunta Selatan District is included in the figure for Baebunta District.
(d) the 2010 population of the new Sukamaju Selatan District is included in the figure for Sukamaju District.
(e) the 2010 population of the new Tanalili District is included in the figure for Bone-Bone District.
(f) including four kelurahan (named in next line) and 15 desa. (g) except for the desa of Balebo (or Baloli) which has a post code of 92912, and the kelurahan of Kappuna (post code 91913), Bone (92914), Kasimbong (92915) and Baliase (92916).
