= Ajatappareng =

Historical region in western South Sulawesi

Ajatappareng was a historical region in the western part of South Sulawesi (today part of Indonesia) consisting of five allied principalities: Sidenreng, Suppa, Rappang, Sawitto, Bacukiki and Alitta. They formed an alliance during the sixteenth century in response to the rise of Gowa and Tallo to the south and rivalling the Telumpoccoe alliance—consisting three Bugis kingdoms of Bone, Wajo, and Soppeng—to the east. The Ajatappareng confederation became a regional power and a major port thanks to its naval power and the exodus of traders fleeing the Portuguese capture of Malacca. The confederation's power declined in the seventeenth century, when it was subjugated by Gowa. The later invasion of South Sulawesi by the Dutch East India Company and its imposition of monopoly ended the region's status as a trade centre.

== Geography ==
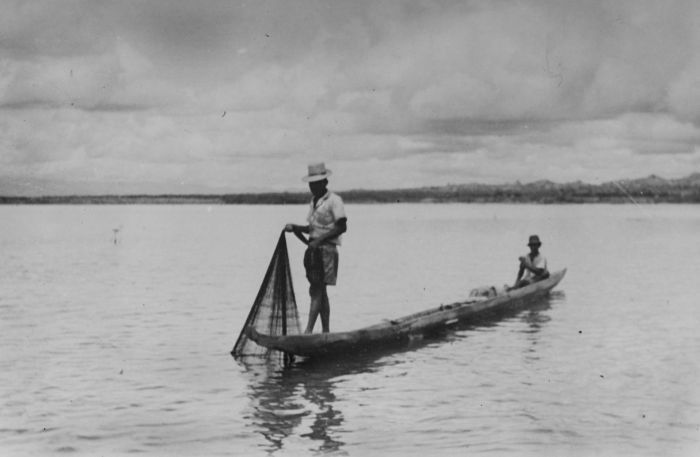
Fishermen in Lake Tempe in the 1940s

In the Bugis language, the term Ajatappareng means "the lands west of the lakes", referring to its location relative to Lakes Tempe, Sidenreng, and Buaya in central South Sulawesi. Today, this region corresponds to four regencies and one city in Indonesia. The former regions of Sawitto and Alitta are now parts of the Pinrang Regency; those of Sidenreng and Rappang become the Sidenreng Rappang Regency, as well as the Maiwa district of the Enrekang Regency, while the former Suppa territory is now split between Pinrang, part of the Barru Regency and the city of Parepare. Various terrains exist in this region, from the hilly north to the fertile plains in the south and centre. Several rivers flow through the area, providing water for extensive wet-rice agriculture. In fact, the region contains some of the most productive area in South Sulawesi for growing rice. Manuel Pinto, a Portuguese explorer who visited Sidenreng in the 1540s, recorded that the region was rich in rice and other crops.

== History ==
=== Early history ===
Since the thirteenth century, people of South Sulawesi began to form chiefdoms supported by intensive farming, including in Ajatappareng. According to Lontara records, the states of Sidenreng and Rappang were established shortly after the founding of the Bone state around 1300. The two Ajatappareng states were largely agrarian and depended on wet-rice farming. In contrast, Suppa was located on the coast and its economy depended on trade. Its existence was dated to at least the fifteenth or the sixteenth century, based on the Ming-era ceramics found in its territory.

=== Confederation ===
The fall of Malacca—a major centre of trade in the Malay World—to the Portuguese in 1511 caused a major exodus among traders (especially Muslim ones) to other ports free from European control. Ports on the western coast of South Sulawesi, including Siang, Talloq, Somba Opu, and Suppa were among the beneficiaries.

The increase in trade expanded Suppa's influence in Ajatappareng, and it probably initiated the alliance between the principalities in the region. According to oral tradition, the confederation was started by Lapancaitana, the seventh datu or leader of Suppa, who at the time also ruled Sawitto and Rappang. Another source states that it was La Makkarawi (or La Makaraie), the fourth datu of Suppa, together with Lapaleteang of Sawitto, Lapateddungi of Sidenreng, and Lapakallongi of Rappang who formed the confederation. The confederation was established around or before the creation of the Tellumpoccoe alliance. Sources estimated 1523, (Note: This estimate was based on the records of Lontara Bacukiki which stated that the confederation was created twelve years after the fall of Malacca.) 1540 or 1582 to be the year of its founding.

The confederation was known as Limaé Ajatappareng ("The Ajatappareng Five"), who referred to themselves as "one house divided into five parts" in the oath of its founding. The agreements between the five principalities likely included economic and military cooperation, and were reinforced to ceremonies and intermarriage between their ruling families. The confederation become a major political power in Sulawesi, supported by its naval power and the status of Suppa as a major trade port. Lontara sources state that Suppa and Sawitto conquered or at least invaded Leworeng, Lemo-Lemo, Bulu Kapa, Bonto-Bonto, Bantaeng, Segeri, Passokreng, Baroko, Toraja, Mamuju, Kaili, Kali dan Toli-Toli. Ajatappareng's sphere of influence extended to the easterly part of Central Sulawesi and it bordered the kingdom of Luwu in Kaili and Toli-Toli.

=== Decline ===
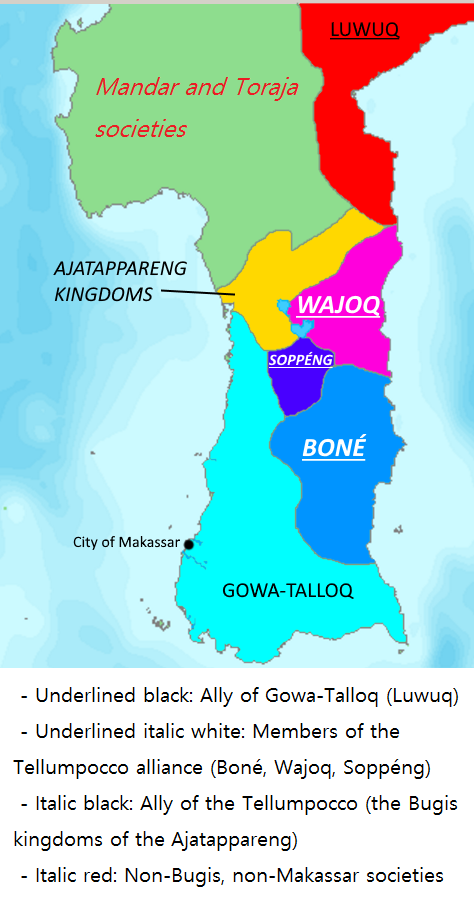
South Sulawesi c. 1590. The Ajatappareng confederation (after its decline) is in yellow.

The expansion of Gowa in the 16th century, and its conflicts with Suppa and Sawitto were the main cause of Ajatappareng's decline. The conversion of ruling families of Ajatappareng to Catholic were probably also politically-motivated to thwart Gowa expansion with Portuguese help that did not come. The Gowa Chronicle recorded that the Gowa ruler Tunipalangga (reigned 1546–1565) invaded and defeated Suppa, Sawitto, as well as Alitta. The chronicle reports that people from these three principalities were brought to Gowa. Historian Leonard Andaya opines that this probably indicates that Malay traders were resettled into Gowa and granted trading rights there, citing a separate passage in the chronicle. In contrast, Stephen C. Druce notes the mention by Suppa and Sawitto texts of members of their ruling family being taken and brutally killed in Gowa, and he proposes that "it appears probable that Gowa removed and enslaved" the population of the defeated kingdoms. Druce says that the Gowa victory secured its status as the dominant power in western South Sulawesi. The other two members of the confederation, Siddenreng and Rappang, did not support their allies against Gowa, despite their longstanding alliance and the extensive intermarriage between their ruling families. It is not clear whether they were allied with Gowa or simply stayed out of the fighting, but Sidenreng was allied with Gowa in another war against Otting in the mid-sixteenth century. Sidenreng and Sappang likely chose to become Gowa's allies or vassals instead of risking a complete loss of their independence. Gowa's power continued to grow. In 1605, the rulers of Gowa converted to Islam and fought victorious wars against the remaining South Sulawesi kingdoms. Sidenreng, the last surviving Ajatappareng principality, was annexed in 1609.

The Dutch East India Company (VOC) invaded Gowa in the Makassar War (1666–1669), resulting in a Dutch victory and the imposition of monopoly through the Bungaya Treaty. This dealt further blow to Ajatappareng—now under Gowa's overlordship, because the region was also bound by the treaty and all of its trade had to be diverted to the Dutch-controlled port of Makassar. Archeological findings also indicate Ajatappareng's decline, showing a decrease in ceramic sherds in the region since the end of the seventeenth century.
