= Makasar script =

Historical Indonesian writing system

Makasar Script Jangang-jangang 𑻪𑻢𑻪𑻢
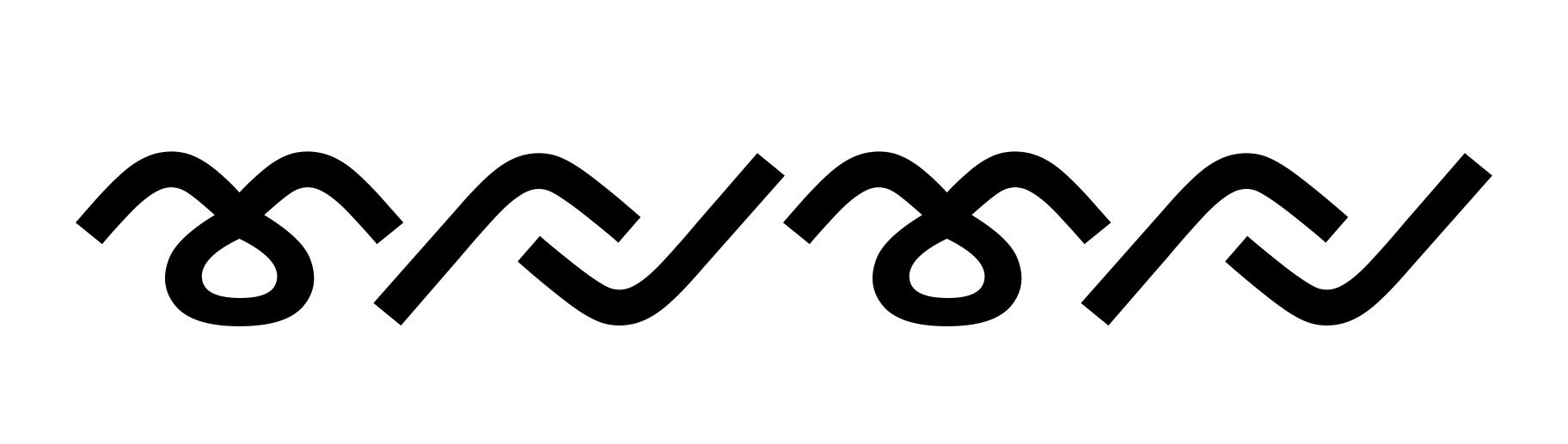
- Script type: Abugida
- Period: 17th–19th century AD
- Direction: Left-to-right
- Languages: Makassarese language

Related scripts
- Parent systems: Egyptian hieroglyphs: Phoenician; Aramaic; Brahmi; Tamil-Brahmi; Pallava; Kawi; Makasar Script
- Sister systems: Balinese; Batak; Baybayin scripts Javanese; Lontara; Old Sundanese; Rencong; Rejang

ISO 15924
- ISO 15924: Maka (366), Makasar

Unicode
- Unicode alias: Makasar
- Unicode range: U+11EE0–U+11EFF

The Makasar script, also known as Ukiriʼ Jangang-jangang (bird's script) or Old Makasar script, is a historical Indonesian writing system that was used in South Sulawesi to write the Makassarese language between the 17th and 19th centuries until it was supplanted by the Lontara Bugis script.

The Makasar script is an abugida which consists of 18 basic characters. Like other Brahmic scripts, each letter represents a syllable with an inherent vowel /a/, which can be changed with diacritics. The direction of writing is left to right. This script is written without wordspacing (scriptio continua) and with little to no punctuation. "Coda syllables", or consonants at the end of syllables, are not written in the Makasar script, so a Makasar text can contain a lot of ambiguity which can only be distinguished from context.

== History ==
Scholars generally believe that the Makasar script was used before South Sulawesi received significant Islamic influence around the 16th century AD, based on the fact that Makasar script uses the abugida system based on the Brahmi script rather than the Arabic script which became commonplace in South Sulawesi later on. This script has its roots in the Brahmi script from southern India, possibly brought to Sulawesi through the Kawi script or another script derived from Kawi. The visual similarity of the South Sumatran characters such as the Rejang script and the Makasar script has led some experts to suggest a relationship between the two scripts. Christopher Miller states that the Makasar script is essentially derived from a pre-17th century variant of Ulu scripts of South Sumatra, with some influence from the Javanese script. Furthermore, Miller argues that the scripts of South Sumatra, South Sulawesi, and the Philippines descend from the Gujarati script, which originates in India.

However, in Stephen C Druce's opinion, it remains debatable as to whether the Makasar script was in use before the 17th century AD. This script is full of curls, curves, bridges and much more suited to being written with ink on paper rather than inscribed on palm-leaf. The Makasar script may thus have been a later innovation, which was developed from the Lontara Bugis script after paper had become available in the early 17th century AD.

There are at least four documented writing systems that have been used in South Sulawesi, which are, chronologically, Makasar script, Lontara script, Arabic script, and Latin script. In the development of manuscripts, these four writing systems are often used together depending on the context of the writing, so it is common to find a manuscript that uses more than one script, including the Makasar script which is often found mixed with the Malay-Arabic alphabet. The Makasar script was originally thought to be the ancestor of the Lontara script, but both are now considered separate branches of an ancient prototype that is assumed to be extinct. Some writers sometimes mention Daeng Pamatte', the 'syahbandar' of the Sultanate of Gowa in the early 16th century AD, as the creator of the Makasar script based on a quote in the Gowa Chronicle (Makassarese: Lontara Patturioloanga ri Tu Gowaya) which reads Daeng Pamatte' ampareki lontara' Mangkasaraka, translated as "Daeng Pamatte' which created the Makassarese Lontara" in the translation of GJ Wolhoff and Abdurrahim published in 1959. However, this opinion is rejected by most historians and linguists today, who argue that the term ampareki in this context is more accurately translated as "composing" in the sense of compiling a library or completing historical records and writing system instead of script creation from nil. The oldest surviving example of the Makasar script is the signature of the delegates from the Sultanete of Gowa in the Treaty of Bongaya from 1667, which is now stored in the National Archives of Indonesia. Meanwhile, one of the earliest manuscripts in the Makasar script of significant length that has survived, is the Gowa-Tallo chronicle from the mid 18th century AD which is kept at the Koninklijk Instituut voor de Tropen (KIT), Amsterdam (collection no. KIT 668/216).

Eventually, the Makasar script was gradually replaced with the Lontara Bugis script, which Makassarese writers sometimes referred to as "New Lontara". This change was likely influenced by the decline in the prestige of the Sultanete of Gowa, along with the increasing strength of the Buginese tribe. As the influence of Gowa decreased, the Makassar scribes no longer used Makasar script in official historical records or everyday documents, although it was still sometimes used in certain contexts as an attempt to distinguish Makassar's cultural identity from Buginese influence. The most recent manuscript with Makasar script so far known is the diary of a Gowa tumailalang (prime minister) from the 19th century whose script form has received significant influence from the Lontara Bugis script. By the end of the 19th century, the use of the Makasar script had been completely replaced by the Lontara Bugis script and nowadays there are no more native readers of the Makasar script.

== Usage ==
Usage of the Makasar script
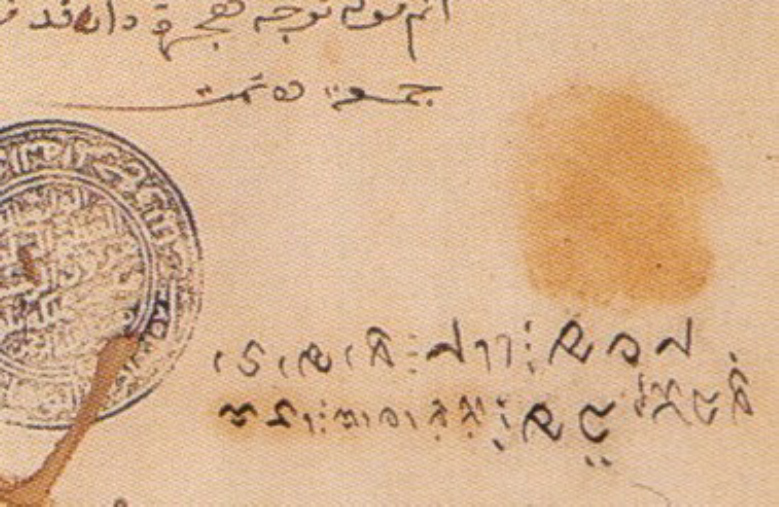
Makassar-script signature from Treaty of Bongaya, collection of the Indonesian National Archives

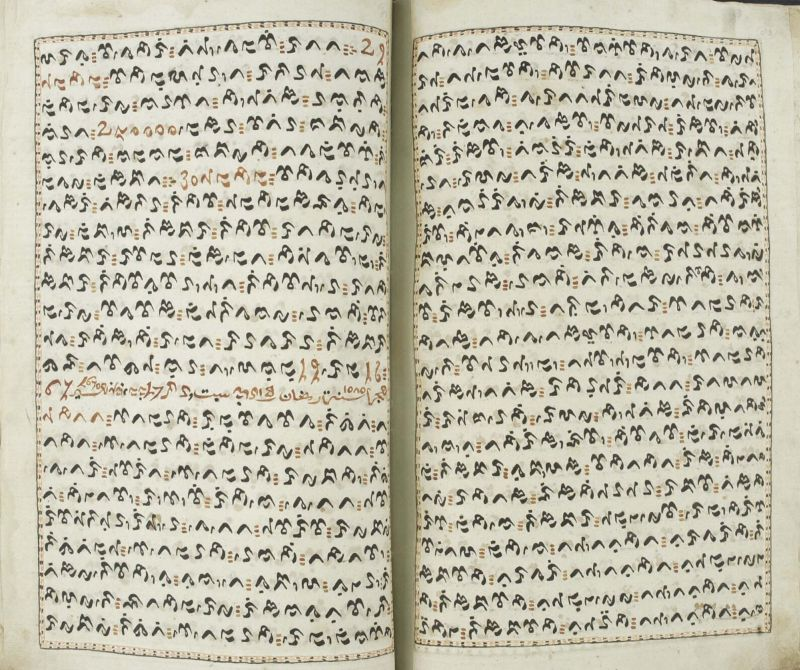
Diary of the prince of Gowa, collection of the Tropenmuseum

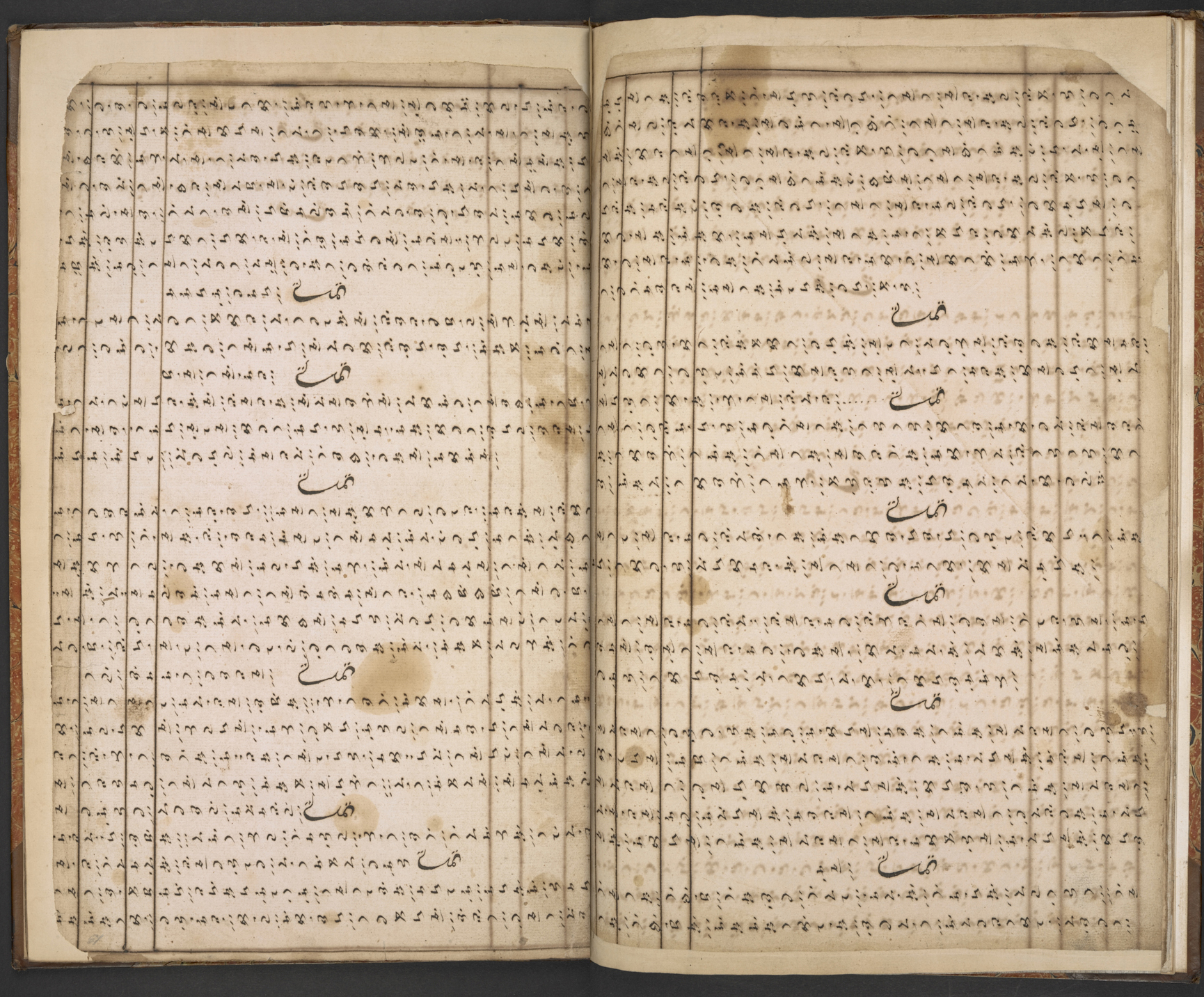
Manuscript in Makassarese script and language around the 18th and 19th century, collection of the British Library

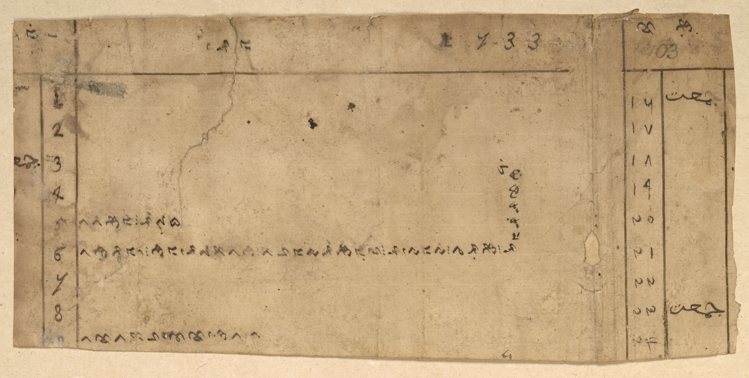
A fragment of a daily note, collection of the British Library

Like the Lontara script which was used in the South Sulawesi cultural sphere, the Makasar script is used in a number of related text traditions, most of which are written in manuscripts. The term lontara (sometimes spelled lontaraq or lontara' to denote the glottal stop at the end) also refers to a literary genre that deals with history and genealogies, the most widely written and important writing topics by the Buginese and Makassar people. This genre can be divided into several sub-types: genealogy (lontara' pangngoriseng), daily registers (lontara' bilang), and historical or chronicle records (patturioloang). Each kingdom of South Sulawesi generally had their own official historiography in some compositional structure that utilized these three forms. Compared to "historical" records from other parts of the archipelago, historical records in the literary tradition of South Sulawesi are considered to be decidedly more "realistic"; historical events are explained in a straightforward and plausible manner, and the relatively few fantastic elements are accompanied by markers such as the word "supposedly" so that the overall record feels factual and realistic. Even so, historical records such as the Makassar's patturiolong are inseparable from their political function as a means of ratifying power, descent, and territorial claims of certain rulers. One of these patturiolongs that was written in the Makasar script and have been researched by experts is the Chronicle of Gowa which describes the history of the kings of Gowa from the founding of the Kingdom of Gowa to the reign of Sultan Hasanuddin in the 17th century AD.

The use of diaries is one of the unique south Sulawesi phenomena with no known analogy in other Malay writing traditions. Daily registers are often made by high ranking member of societies, such as the sultans, the rulers (karaeng), or the prime ministers (tumailalang). The bulk of daily register consists of ruled tables with rows of dates, in which the register owner would log important events in the allocated space of each date. Not all lines are filled if the corresponding dates did not have anything considered worthwhile to note, but only one line is reserved for each date. For a particularly eventful date, the continuing line would be written sideways to the page, following a zig-zag pattern until all space are filled.

== Ambiguity ==
Makasar script does not have a virama or other ways to write dead syllables even though the Makassarese language has many words with coda syllables. For example, the final nasal sound /-ŋ/ and glottal /ʔ/ which are common in Makassar language are not written in the Makasar script spelling at all, so words like ama (chicken lice), ama (like), and amang' (safe) will all be written as ama 𑻱𑻥 in the Makassar script. The word baba 𑻤𑻤 in the Makasar script can refer to six possible words: baba, baba', ba'ba, ba'ba', bamba, and bambang. Given that Makasar script is also traditionally written without word breaks, a typical text often have a lot of ambiguous portion which can often only be distinguished through context. Readers of Makasar texts need an adequate prior understanding of the language and contents of the text in question in order to read them fluently. This ambiguity is analogous to the use of Arabic letters without vowel markers; readers whose native language uses Arabic characters intuitively understand which vowels are appropriate to use in the context of the sentence concerned, so that vowel markers are not needed in standard everyday texts.

Even so, sometimes even context isn't sufficient to reveal how to read a sentence whose reference is unknown to the reader. As an illustration, Cummings and Jukes provide the following example to illustrate how the Makasar script can produce different meanings depending on how the reader cuts and fills in the ambiguous part:

Lontara script	Possible reading	
Lontara script	Latin	Meaning
𑻱𑻤𑻵𑻦𑻱𑻳	a'bétai	he won (intransitive)
𑻱𑻤𑻵𑻦𑻱𑻳	ambétai	he beat... (transitive)
𑻨𑻠𑻭𑻵𑻱𑻳𑻣𑻵𑻣𑻵𑻤𑻮𑻧𑻦𑻶𑻠	nakanréi pépé' balla' datoka	fire devouring a temple
𑻨𑻠𑻭𑻵𑻱𑻳𑻣𑻵𑻣𑻵𑻤𑻮𑻧𑻦𑻶𑻠	nakanréi pépé' balanda tokka'	fire devouring a bald Hollander

Without knowing the intent or event to which the author may be referring, it can be impossible for a general reader to determine the "correct" reading of the above sentence. Even the most proficient readers often needs to pause to re-interpret what they have read as new context are found in later portion of the same text.

== Form ==
=== Basic letters ===
Basic letters (𑻱𑻭𑻶𑻮𑻶𑻦𑻭 anrong lontara’) in Makasar script represent a syllable with inherent /a/. There are 18 basic letters, shown below:

Anrong Lontaraʼ
ka	ga	nga	pa	ba	ma	ta	da	na
𑻠	𑻡	𑻢	𑻣	𑻤	𑻥	𑻦	𑻧	𑻨
ca	ja	nya	ya	ra	la	wa	sa	a
𑻩	𑻪	𑻫	𑻬	𑻭	𑻮	𑻯	𑻰	𑻱

Note that the Makassar script has never undergone a standardization process like the Buginese Lontara script later on, so there are many variations of writing that can be found in Makassar manuscripts. The form in the table above is adapted from the characters used in the diary of Pangeran Gowa, Tropenmuseum collection, numbered KIT 668-216.

=== Diacritic ===
Diacritics (𑻱𑻨𑻮𑻶𑻦𑻭 anaʼ lontaraʼ) are markings on the basic letters to change its vowel. There are 4 diacritics, shown below:

Anaʼ Lontaraʼ
	-i	-u	-e^{[1]}	-o
Name	tittiʼ i rate 𑻦𑻳𑻳𑻱𑻳𑻭𑻦𑻵	tittiʼ i rawa 𑻦𑻳𑻳𑻱𑻳𑻭𑻯	anaʼ ri olo 𑻱𑻨𑻭𑻳𑻱𑻶𑻮𑻶	anaʼ ri boko 𑻱𑻨𑻭𑻳𑻤𑻶𑻠𑻶
na	ni	nu	ne	no
𑻨	𑻨𑻳	𑻨𑻴	𑻨𑻵	𑻨𑻶
Notes: 1. /e/ as in the first e in "every"

=== Punctuation ===
Historical Makassarese texts are written without wordspacing (scriptio continua) and do not use punctuation. The Makasar script is known to have only two original punctuation marks: passimbang and a section ending mark. Passimbang functions like a period or comma in the Latin script by dividing the text into chunks that are similar (but not the same) to stanzas or sentences, while section ending marks are used to split the text into chapter-like units.

Punctuation marks
passimbang	section end
𑻷	𑻸

In certain manuscripts, the ending mark of a section is replaced by a punctuation that resembles a palm tree (🌴︎), and for the end of larger sections it is common to use the stylization of the word tammat which uses Arabic letters تمت).

=== Repeated consonants ===
Continuous syllables with the same initial consonant are often written in abbreviated form using double diacritics or a repeater letter angka which can then be reattached with a diacritic. Its use can be seen as follows:

Syllable reduplication

Double diacritics
	dudu
without double diacritics	
without double diacritics	𑻧𑻴𑻧𑻴
with double diacritics	
with double diacritics	𑻧𑻴𑻴

Angka
	dada	dadu	duda
without angka			
without angka	𑻧𑻧	𑻧𑻧𑻴	𑻧𑻴𑻧
with angka			
with angka	𑻧𑻲	𑻧𑻲𑻴	𑻧𑻴𑻲

== Example texts ==
The following is an excerpt from the Chronicle of Gowa which tells the course of a battle between the Gowa and the Kingdom of Tallo which culminated in their alliance during the reign of Karaeng Gowa Tumapa'risi 'Kallonna and Karaeng Tallo Tunipasuru'. (Note: The spelling of the original Makasar script is preserved here, while the color of the writing has been turned uniformly black. Transliteration and translation adapted from Jukes (2019: 368-69), with some additional information from the translated version of William Cummings (2007).)

𑻱𑻳𑻬𑻦𑻶𑻥𑻳𑻱𑻨𑻵𑻷𑻥𑻡𑻱𑻴𑻷𑻨𑻨𑻳𑻮𑻳𑻣𑻴𑻢𑻳𑻷𑻨𑻳𑻤𑻴𑻧𑻴𑻷𑻭𑻳𑻦𑻴𑻦𑻮𑻶𑻠𑻷𑻭𑻳𑻦𑻴𑻥𑻭𑻴𑻰𑻴𑻠𑻷𑻭𑻳𑻦𑻴𑻣𑻶𑻮𑻶𑻤𑻠𑻵𑻢𑻷
ia–tommi anne. ma'gau'. na nilipungi. nibundu'. ri tu Talloka. ri tu Marusuka. ri tu Polombangkenga.
On the reign [of Tumapa'risi' Kallonna] he too was surrounded and attacked by the Tallo, the Maros, [and] the Polombangkeng people.
𑻠𑻭𑻱𑻵𑻢𑻷𑻭𑻳𑻦𑻮𑻶𑻷𑻨𑻱𑻡𑻱𑻢𑻷𑻰𑻳𑻯𑻵𑻷𑻦𑻴𑻨𑻳𑻣𑻱𑻰𑻴𑻭𑻴𑻷
Karaenga. ri Tallo'. naagaanga. siewa. Tunipasuru'.
The Karaeng Tallo that fought him was Tunipasuru'.
𑻱𑻭𑻵𑻠𑻮𑻵𑻨𑻷𑻱𑻳𑻬𑻠𑻴𑻥𑻤𑻰𑻴𑻷𑻨𑻳𑻠𑻨𑻷𑻱𑻳𑻥𑻢𑻬𑻶𑻯𑻤𑻵𑻭𑻷
areng kalenna. iang kumabassung. nikana. I Mangayoaberang.
His given name, may i not be damned [for insolently calling his name], was I Mangayoaberang.
𑻥𑻡𑻯𑻴𑻠𑻷𑻭𑻳𑻥𑻭𑻴𑻰𑻴𑻷𑻨𑻳𑻠𑻨𑻷𑻣𑻦𑻨𑻮𑻠𑻨
ma'gauka. ri Marusu'. nikana. Patanna Langkana.
[Meanwhile, the ruler] that ruled in Maros [on that time] was Patanna Langkana.
𑻱𑻭𑻵𑻥𑻦𑻵𑻨𑻷𑻨𑻳𑻠𑻨𑻷𑻦𑻴𑻥𑻥𑻵𑻨𑻭𑻳𑻤𑻴𑻮𑻴𑻧𑻴𑻯𑻬𑻷
areng matena. nikana. Tumamenang ri Bulu'duaya.
His posthumous name is Tumamenang ri Bulu'duaya.
𑻱𑻭𑻵𑻠𑻮𑻵𑻨𑻱𑻳𑻬𑻠𑻴𑻥𑻤𑻰𑻴𑻷𑻱𑻳𑻥𑻣𑻰𑻶𑻤𑻷
areng kalenna iang kumabassung. I Mappasomba.
His given name, may i not be damned, was I Mappasomba.
𑻱𑻭𑻵𑻣𑻥𑻨𑻨𑻷𑻨𑻳𑻠𑻨𑻷𑻱𑻳𑻧𑻱𑻵𑻢𑻴𑻭𑻡𑻷
areng pamana'na. nikana. I Daeng Nguraga.
His proper name was I Daeng Nguraga.
𑻦𑻴𑻥𑻡𑻱𑻴𑻠𑻷𑻭𑻳𑻤𑻪𑻵𑻷𑻱𑻨𑻨𑻷𑻠𑻭𑻱𑻵𑻮𑻶𑻯𑻵𑻷𑻨𑻳𑻠𑻨𑻬𑻧𑻱𑻵𑻨𑻱𑻳𑻣𑻰𑻱𑻳𑻭𑻳𑻷𑻠𑻠𑻨𑻱𑻳𑻧𑻱𑻵𑻥𑻰𑻭𑻶𑻷
Tuma'gauka. ri Bajeng. ana'na. Karaeng Loe. nikanaya Daenna I Pasairi. kakanna I Daeng Masarro.
He who ruled in Bajeng [Polombangkeng] is the son of Karaeng Loe, named Daenna I Pasairi, older sibbling of I Daeng Masarro.
𑻱𑻳𑻬𑻥𑻳𑻨𑻵𑻷𑻰𑻭𑻳𑻤𑻱𑻦𑻷𑻦𑻴𑻥𑻡𑻱𑻴𑻠𑻷𑻭𑻳𑻰𑻭𑻤𑻶𑻨𑻵𑻷𑻭𑻳𑻮𑻵𑻠𑻵𑻰𑻵𑻷𑻭𑻳𑻠𑻦𑻳𑻢𑻷𑻭𑻳𑻪𑻥𑻭𑻷𑻭𑻳𑻪𑻳𑻣𑻷𑻭𑻳𑻥𑻧𑻮𑻵𑻷
iaminne. sari'battang. Tuma'gauka. ri Sanrabone. ri Lengkese'. ri Katingang. ri Jamarang. ri Jipang. ri Mandalle'.
This [I Pasairi] were sibblings with those that ruled in Sanrabone, in Lengkese', in Katingang, in Jamarang, in Jipang, [and] in Mandalle. (Note: The kingdums mentioned in this line, along with the Bajeng mentioned earlier, are the seven countries that make up the Polombangkeng confederation.)
𑻦𑻴𑻪𑻴𑻱𑻳𑻰𑻳𑻰𑻭𑻳𑻤𑻦𑻷𑻥𑻮𑻮𑻰𑻳𑻣𑻴𑻯𑻵𑻢𑻱𑻰𑻵𑻷𑻷
tujui sisari'battang. ma'la'lang sipue–ngaseng.
seven sibblings, all half-umbrella'd [=ruled]. (Note: La'lang sipue or "half umbrella" is a kind of umbrella made of palm leaves which is used at the inauguration of a ruler.)
𑻱𑻳𑻬𑻥𑻳𑻨𑻵𑻠𑻭𑻱𑻵𑻷𑻨𑻳𑻮𑻳𑻣𑻴𑻢𑻳𑻷𑻭𑻳𑻡𑻱𑻴𑻠𑻦𑻮𑻴𑻯𑻷
iaminne Karaeng. nilipungi. ri Gaukang Tallua.
This Karaeng [Tumapa'risi' Kallonna] is supported by The Three Gaukang. (Note: "The Three Gaukang" refers to Gowa's banners of greatness called Gurudaya, Sulengkaya, and Cakkuridia.)
𑻠𑻭𑻱𑻵𑻢𑻭𑻳𑻮𑻠𑻳𑻬𑻴𑻷𑻱𑻢𑻡𑻢𑻳𑻷𑻡𑻴𑻭𑻴𑻧𑻬𑻷𑻦𑻴𑻥𑻢𑻰𑻬𑻷𑻦𑻴𑻦𑻶𑻤𑻶𑻮𑻶𑻠𑻷𑻦𑻴𑻰𑻱𑻶𑻥𑻦𑻬𑻷
Karaenga ri Lakiung. angngagangi. Gurudaya. tu Mangngasaya. tu Tomboloka. tu Saomataya.
Kareng Lakiung accompanies Gurudaya, [along with] Mangngasa, Tombolo' and Saomata people,
𑻱𑻪𑻶𑻭𑻵𑻢𑻳𑻷𑻠𑻮𑻵𑻨𑻷𑻱𑻳𑻥𑻥𑻠𑻰𑻳𑻷𑻤𑻭𑻶𑻤𑻶𑻰𑻶𑻷𑻨𑻣𑻥𑻵𑻦𑻵𑻢𑻳𑻷
anjorengi. kalenna. imamakasi. Baro'boso'. napammenténgi.
there they set camp, in Baro'boso', on alert,
𑻱𑻳𑻬𑻥𑻳𑻨𑻱𑻡𑻱𑻷𑻰𑻳𑻦𑻴𑻪𑻴𑻷𑻦𑻶𑻣𑻶𑻮𑻶𑻤𑻱𑻠𑻵𑻢𑻷
iami naagaang. situju. tu Polombangkenga.
they joined together [to] face Polombangkeng people.
𑻠𑻮𑻵𑻨𑻠𑻭𑻱𑻵𑻢𑻷𑻰𑻳𑻬𑻡𑻢𑻳𑻷𑻰𑻴𑻮𑻵𑻠𑻬𑻷
kalenna Karaenga. siagángi. Sulengkaya.
The Karaeng [Tumapa'risi' Kallonna] himself accompanies Sulengkaya,
𑻭𑻣𑻶𑻩𑻳𑻨𑻳𑻷𑻨𑻣𑻥𑻵𑻦𑻵𑻢𑻳𑻷𑻰𑻳𑻬𑻡𑻢𑻳𑻷𑻦𑻴𑻰𑻴𑻧𑻳𑻬𑻢𑻷𑻦𑻴𑻥𑻨𑻴𑻪𑻴𑻯𑻷𑻦𑻴𑻤𑻶𑻭𑻳𑻰𑻮𑻶𑻯𑻷
Rappocini. napammenténgi. siagángi. tu Sudianga. tu Manujua. tu Borisalloa.
ready in Rappocini along with Sudiang, Manuju, and Borisallo people.
𑻦𑻴𑻦𑻮𑻶𑻠𑻷𑻰𑻳𑻬𑻡𑻱𑻷𑻠𑻮𑻵𑻨𑻷𑻱𑻳𑻧𑻱𑻵𑻥𑻰𑻭𑻶𑻷𑻱𑻳𑻬𑻥𑻳𑻨𑻱𑻡𑻱𑻷𑻰𑻳𑻦𑻴𑻪𑻴𑻷𑻠𑻮𑻵𑻨𑻠𑻭𑻱𑻵𑻢𑻷
tu Talloka. siagaang. kalenna. I Daeng Masarro. iami naagaang. situju. kalenna Karaenga.
Tallo people and I Daeng Masarro himself faced The Karaeng.
𑻠𑻭𑻱𑻵𑻢𑻭𑻳𑻧𑻦𑻷𑻰𑻳𑻬𑻡𑻢𑻳𑻷𑻩𑻠𑻴𑻭𑻳𑻧𑻳𑻬𑻷𑻦𑻥𑻥𑻢𑻴𑻷𑻨𑻣𑻥𑻵𑻦𑻵𑻢𑻳𑻷𑻰𑻳𑻬𑻡𑻢𑻳𑻷𑻣𑻩𑻵𑻮𑻵𑻠𑻷𑻣𑻦𑻮𑻰𑻷𑻤𑻶𑻦𑻶𑻥𑻨𑻱𑻳𑻷
Karaenga ri Data'. siagángi. Cakkuridia. Tamamangung. napammenténgi. siagángi. Paccellekang. Pattallassang. Bontomanai'.
Karaeng Data accompanies Cakkuridia, in Tamamangung he readies themself along with Paccellekang, Pattallasang, and Bontomanai' [people],
𑻦𑻴𑻥𑻭𑻴𑻰𑻴𑻠𑻷𑻨𑻱𑻡𑻱𑻷𑻰𑻳𑻦𑻴𑻪𑻴𑻷
tu Marusuka. naagaang. situju.
Maros people, they faced.
𑻮𑻵𑻤𑻠𑻳𑻷𑻥𑻤𑻴𑻧𑻴𑻠𑻳𑻷𑻨𑻳𑻣𑻮𑻭𑻳𑻥𑻳𑻷𑻦𑻴𑻦𑻮𑻶𑻠𑻦𑻴𑻥𑻭𑻴𑻰𑻴𑻠𑻷𑻦𑻴𑻣𑻶𑻮𑻶𑻤𑻠𑻵𑻢𑻷
le'baki. ma'bunduki. nipalarimi. tu Talloka tu Marusuka. tu Polombangkenga.
Once the battle started, the Tallo', Maros, and Polombangkeng people had already fled.
𑻦𑻴𑻥𑻭𑻴𑻰𑻴𑻠𑻷𑻮𑻭𑻳𑻨𑻷𑻭𑻳𑻦𑻥𑻥𑻢𑻴𑻷𑻦𑻴𑻮𑻴𑻰𑻴𑻠𑻳𑻷𑻥𑻨𑻱𑻴𑻭𑻳𑻥𑻭𑻴𑻰𑻴𑻷
tu Marusuka. larina. ri Tamamangung. tulusuki. manaung ri Marusu'.
Maros people went from Tamamangung, directly to Maros.
𑻦𑻴𑻣𑻶𑻮𑻶𑻤𑻠𑻵𑻢𑻷𑻥𑻢𑻴𑻮𑻶𑻭𑻶𑻥𑻥𑻳𑻷𑻤𑻳𑻰𑻵𑻬𑻷𑻨𑻥𑻤𑻳𑻰𑻵𑻬𑻥𑻨𑻱𑻳𑻷
tu Polombangkenga. mangnguloro'–mami. biseang. na ma'biseang manai'.
Polombangkeng people stretch out their oars and pedal up [back to Polombangkeng].
𑻦𑻴𑻦𑻮𑻶𑻠𑻷𑻥𑻮𑻭𑻳𑻥𑻦𑻥𑻭𑻳𑻦𑻮𑻶𑻷
tu Talloka. malari mantama ri Tallo'
Tallo people ran back to Tallo' [region]
𑻨𑻰𑻴𑻮𑻴𑻥𑻱𑻵𑻷𑻨𑻰𑻴𑻭𑻶𑻠𑻳𑻬𑻶𑻷𑻠𑻭𑻱𑻵𑻢𑻷𑻦𑻴𑻥𑻣𑻭𑻳𑻰𑻳𑻠𑻮𑻶𑻨𑻷𑻱𑻦𑻥𑻭𑻳𑻦𑻮𑻶𑻷
nassulu' mae. nasuro kio'. Karaenga. Tumapa'risi Kallonna. antama ri Tallo'.
[Then] they sent out a request to meet The Karaeng, Tumapa'risi' Kallonna. Thus he entered Tallo'.
𑻦𑻪𑻤𑻢𑻳𑻱𑻳𑻷𑻮𑻮𑻷𑻨𑻳𑻦𑻶𑻯𑻨𑻷𑻨𑻳𑻭𑻣𑻶𑻱𑻳𑻷
tuju bangngi i. lalang. nitoana. nirappói.
Seven nights he was there, entertained and given betel nut.
𑻱𑻳𑻬𑻥𑻳𑻪𑻶𑻷𑻨𑻰𑻳𑻦𑻮𑻳𑻥𑻶𑻷𑻠𑻭𑻱𑻵𑻢𑻷𑻭𑻳𑻡𑻶𑻯𑻷𑻠𑻭𑻱𑻵𑻢𑻷𑻭𑻳𑻦𑻮𑻶𑻷𑻡𑻮𑻭𑻢𑻷𑻱𑻳𑻬𑻢𑻰𑻵𑻷𑻭𑻳𑻤𑻭𑻴𑻡𑻨𑻳𑻠𑻵𑻮𑻴𑻯𑻷
iaminjo. nasitalli'mo. Karaenga. ri Gowa. Karaenga. ri Tallo'. gallaranga. ia– ngaseng. ri baruga nikelua.
These [mentioned below] thus sworn: The Karaeng Gowa, The Karaeng Tallo', [along with] every gallarrang in balairung.
𑻱𑻳𑻬𑻱𑻳𑻬𑻨𑻥𑻶𑻷𑻦𑻱𑻴𑻷𑻱𑻣𑻰𑻳𑻱𑻵𑻯𑻱𑻳𑻷𑻡𑻶𑻯𑻷𑻦𑻮𑻶𑻷𑻱𑻳𑻬𑻥𑻶𑻨𑻩𑻮𑻭𑻵𑻯𑻦𑻷
ia–iannamo. tau. ampasiewai. Gowa. Tallo'. iamo nacalla. rewata.
[That] anyone who makes Gowa and Tallo' hostile to each other, will surely be cursed by the gods.

== Comparison to Lontara script ==
In its development, the use of the Makasar script was gradually replaced by the Lontara Bugis script which is sometimes referred to as "New Lontara" by Makassarese writers. These two closely related scripts have almost identical writing rules, although in appearance they look quite different. A comparison of the two characters can be seen as follows:

Basic letters
	ka	ga	nga	ngka	pa	ba	ma	mpa	ta	da	na	nra
Makasar												
Makasar	𑻠	𑻡	𑻢		𑻣	𑻤	𑻥		𑻦	𑻧	𑻨	
Bugis												
Bugis	ᨀ	ᨁ	ᨂ	ᨃ	ᨄ	ᨅ	ᨆ	ᨇ	ᨈ	ᨉ	ᨊ	ᨋ
	ca	ja	nya	nca	ya	ra	la	wa	sa	a	ha	
Makasar												
Makasar	𑻩	𑻪	𑻫		𑻬	𑻭	𑻮	𑻯	𑻰	𑻱		
Bugis												
Bugis	ᨌ	ᨍ	ᨎ	ᨏ	ᨐ	ᨑ	ᨒ	ᨓ	ᨔ	ᨕ	ᨖ	

Diacritic
	-a	-i	-u	-é^{[1]}	-o	-e^{[2]}
	na	ni	nu	né	no	ne
Makasar						
Makasar	𑻨	𑻨𑻳	𑻨𑻴	𑻨𑻵	𑻨𑻶	
Bugis						
Bugis	ᨊ	ᨊᨗ	ᨊᨘ	ᨊᨙ	ᨊᨚ	ᨊᨛ
Notes: 1. /e/ as in the first e in "every"; 2. /ə/ as in the second e in "every"

Punctuations
Makasar	passimbang	section end
Makasar	𑻷	𑻸
Bugis	pallawa	section end
Bugis	᨞	᨟

== Unicode ==
Makasar script has been added to the Unicode Standard in June 2018 on Version 11.0.

The Unicode block for the Makassar script is U+11EE0–U+11EFF and contains 25 characters:

Makasar^{[1]}^{[2]} Official Unicode Consortium code chart (PDF)
	0	1	2	3	4	5	6	7	8	9	A	B	C	D	E	F
U+11EEx	𑻠	𑻡	𑻢	𑻣	𑻤	𑻥	𑻦	𑻧	𑻨	𑻩	𑻪	𑻫	𑻬	𑻭	𑻮	𑻯
U+11EFx	𑻰	𑻱	𑻲	𑻳	𑻴	𑻵	𑻶	𑻷	𑻸							
Notes 1.As of Unicode version 18.0 2.Grey areas indicate non-assigned code points

=== Font ===
A font for Makasar script based on the unicode block were first created under the name Jangang-jangang in early 2020. This font support the graphite SIL technology and double letters, both with angka (example: 𑻥𑻲𑻳 mami) and by double diacritic (example: 𑻥𑻳𑻳 mimi and 𑻥𑻴𑻴 mumu).

== See also ==
- Makassarese language – Austronesian language of South Sulawesi, Indonesia
- Lontara script – Indonesian writing system
