= Wajoq =

Former state in South Sulawesi, Indonesia

Kingdom of Wajoq (House of Royal Buginese Wajoq) ᨕᨀᨑᨘᨂᨛ ᨑᨗ ᨓᨍᨚ Akkarungeng ri Wajoq
- c. 1400–1957
- Status: Part of Dutch East Indies (1906–1949); Part of Indonesia (1949–1957)
- Capital: Tosora (until 1906); Séngkang (1906–1957)
- Common languages: Bugis
- Government: Elective constitutional monarchy
- Historical era: Early modern to late modern periods
  - Established: early 15th century
  - Subjugated by the Dutch colonial government: 1906
  - Disestablished and transformed into a regency of South Sulawesi: 1957
Preceded by	Succeeded by
Cinnotabiq	Wajo Regency
- Today part of: Indonesia

Wajoq, also spelled Wajo, Wajo', or Wajok, (Note: The glottal stop in Bugis and other South Sulawesi languages is variously represented with ⟨q⟩, ⟨k⟩, ⟨'⟩, or left unwritten. For consistency, this article follows the scheme used in Druce (2009), where ⟨q⟩ is used for the glottal stop, ⟨e⟩ represents a schwa, and ⟨é⟩ represents [e].) was a Bugis elective principality in the eastern part of the South Sulawesi peninsula. It was founded in the 15th century, and reached its peak in the 18th century, when it briefly became the hegemon of South Sulawesi replacing Boné. Wajoq retained its independence until it was subdued in the early 20th century by the Dutch colonial government. It continued to exist in some form up to the mid-20th century, when the self-governing entity was transformed into Wajo Regency in the newly independent Republic of Indonesia.

== History ==
=== Early history (c. 1400–1582) ===
The emergence of Wajoq and other interior polities of South Sulawesi is associated with the major agricultural expansion and political centralization in the 14th century, which was encouraged by an increase in external demand for South Sulawesi rice. Population rose as the formerly common swidden agriculture was increasingly replaced with intensive wet rice cultivation. Throughout the interior of the peninsula, forests were cleared and new settlements founded. The people of Wajoq themselves associate the origin of their polity with migrations and establishment of new settlements. Wajorese text Lontaraq Sukkuqna Wajoq (Complete Chronicle of Wajoq), for example, recounts the story of a Bugis noble who, on a hunting expedition, found "an area with wide fields, thick forests with wild boars, deer, and buffalo, and numerous lakes replete with fish". He then decided to settle there and founded the polity of Cinnotabiq, which transformed into Wajoq in the early 15th century.

Tradition maintains that the name "Wajoq" came from the bajoq (Note: Commonly identified as a Macaranga species (Abidin 1985, p. 403).) tree, under which the then Cinnotabiq ruler La Tenribali (Note: Also known in several manuscripts as La Tenriba or La Tenribabbareng (Abidin 1985, p. 399).) supposedly concluded a social contract with the three chiefs of Boliq, whose communities formed the core of Wajoq. La Tenribali was appointed to reign over Boliq lands and thus became the first batara (ruler, lit. "sky") of Wajoq. The third batara of Wajoq, La Pateddungi To Samallangiq, was forced to abdicate by his people, reportedly because of his immoral actions. He was later assassinated by a Wajorese noble. Wajoq then underwent a constitutional change, after which a governing council was established. This council included and was presided by an elective principal ruler, who from then on would be known as the arung matoa (lit. "senior lord"). La Paléwo To Palippu from Béttémpola was chosen by the council as the first arung matoa of Wajoq.

During the reign of the fourth arung matoa, La Tadampareq Puang ri Maggalatung (r. c. 1491–1521), Wajoq became one of the major Bugis polities. By the turn of the 16th century, Wajoq had been able to secure a relatively higher standing in its relationship with the neighboring Luwuq, which was a powerful polity in South Sulawesi during the 15th century, and presumably was regarded as Wajoq's overlord. Together with Luwuq, Wajoq won a war against the nearby polity of Sidénréng in Ajatappareng, forcing the latter to cede its territories north of the central lakes to Wajoq. Wajoq under La Tadampareq also absorbed the remnants of what might have been the core territories of Cina, another influential early Bugis polity. Balance of power in the region further shifted in the early 16th century when Boné, a Bugis polity south of Wajoq, emerged victorious against Luwuq, and thus assumed a paramount position in the eastern part of the peninsula. At the same time, the Makassar twin kingdoms of Gowa and Talloq to the west also started to expand their power. Early in the century, Gowa had cooperated with Boné in wars against Luwuq and Wajoq, but by the mid of the century their struggles for hegemony made Gowa and Boné clashed against each other. By this time, Wajoq had also fallen under Gowa's sphere of influence, and supported Gowa in a war against Boné in the 1560s.

=== The Tellumpocco alliance and the rise of Gowa-Talloq (1582–1660) ===
Political division of southern Sulawesi in around 1590

The continued rise of Gowa and its harsh treatment of its Bugis subordinates Wajoq and Soppéng prompted the latter two to sign the Treaty of Timurung, a mutual defense pact initiated by Boné in 1582. The relationship between these three allied Bugis polities, also known as the Tellumpocco ("Three Powers", lit. "Three Peaks"), is defined as that of brothers, with Boné acting as the elder, Wajoq the middle, and Soppéng the younger one. It sought to reclaim the autonomy of these Bugis lands, and to stop Gowa's expansionism. Gowa's subsequent campaigns against Wajoq in 1582 as well as against Boné in 1585 and 1588 were all successfully repulsed by the alliance. Another campaign in 1590 was abandoned following the murder of Gowa's ruler Tunijalloq.

Nevertheless, by the early 17th century, Gowa and Talloq had succeeded in becoming the most dominant powers in the South Sulawesi peninsula as they bolstered international trade and promoted the new faith of Islam. Between 1608 and 1611, Gowa waged successful campaigns throughout South Sulawesi, forcing Soppéng to embrace Islam in 1609, Wajoq in 1610, and Boné in 1611. Thereafter, the Tellumpocco surrendered the control of their foreign affairs to Gowa, although they were allowed to retain the alliance and still preserve considerable autonomy within their own domains. This arrangement proved to be quite successful to win the support of the Bugis. Wajoq in particular grew increasingly loyal to Gowa. The arung matoa To Mappassaungngé (r. 1627–1628) even offered to guard the Gowa capital when its ruler was off for an expedition, despite he was not being obliged to do so.

Wajoq entered another conflict when the ruler of Boné, La Maddaremmeng (r. 1626–1643), whether for political or religious reasons, attacked and pillaged Pénéki, one of Wajoq's constituent communities. (Note: La Maddaremmeng had previously become a subject of controversy, as he had enforced a stricter interpretation of Islam to his people. He also went to abolish non-hereditary slavery in accordance to his belief, and tried to convince the other Tellumpocco members to follow his steps. This was not received favorably by Gowa, who viewed Boné's attempt to spread its religious influence as a direct challenge to its hegemony over South Sulawesi (Wellen 2014, p. 29; Andaya 1981, pp. 39–40; Pelras 1996, p. 142).) As La Maddaremmeng refused to compensate for the goods seized in Pénéki, Wajoq and Boné went to war against each other. Gowa and Soppéng sided with Wajoq in this conflict, and the joint forces succeeded in defeating Boné in late 1643. Boné was harshly punished by being made a vassal of Gowa, with a Bugis noble installed as a regent responsible to a Makassar lord. A subsequent rebellion led by La Maddaremmeng's brother was also quashed, and Boné's status was further degraded to that of a "slave" (i.e. a colony), while its nobles were forcibly relocated to Gowa. Several contested territories held by Boné were given to Wajoq, and a large number of people from Boné were forced into unpaid labor in Wajoq. This humiliation entrenched a feeling of resentment among the people of Boné towards both Gowa and Wajoq.

=== Makassar War and Wajorese migrations (1660–1730) ===
By the second quarter of the 17th century, Gowa and Talloq had become the most politically and economically powerful polities in eastern Indonesia. The twin kingdoms' attempt to retain their hegemony brought them to a conflict with the Dutch East India Company (VOC), which wanted to monopolize the spice trade in the Moluccas. In 1660, the Dutch attacked Gowa and managed to seize the fort of Paqnakkukang. Gowa then forced its vassals to provide labor to build military constructions in anticipation of further conflict, which ultimately resulted in a rebellion led by the Boné noble Arung Palakka. However, his attempt to revive the Tellumpocco alliance failed, as Wajoq refused to break its treaty with Gowa to join forces with the rebels. Lacking enough support, the rebellion was successfully quelled by Gowa and Wajoq forces, driving Arung Palakka to escape to Buton, and later, to Batavia, seeking aid from the VOC.

During the Makassar War (1666–1669), Wajoq fiercely supported Gowa against the alliance of the VOC and local forces from Boné and elsewhere led by Arung Palakka. Even after the fall of Gowa's court Sombaopu and the formal surrender of Gowa and Talloq, the arung matoa La Tenrilai To Sengngeng (r. 1658–1670) still refused to abide by the Treaty of Bungaya and continued to resist the Dutch and Boné forces. By mid-1670, Arung Palakka had launched a large-scale invasion of Wajoq. Despite hard resistance from Wajorese defenders, the walled capital city of Tosora fell to the Boné-led forces in December 1670. La Tenrilai was killed in action, and his successor La Paliliq To Malu (r. 1670–1679) was forced to sign a treaty restricting Wajorese political, trade and military powers, in addition to the Treaty of Bungaya. In spite of Wajoq's surrender, it still faced harsh retribution from Arung Palakka and the people of Boné. Many Wajorese were kidnapped and harassed or had their belongings seized. Boné also annexed the coastal territories near the mouth of Cenrana River, which was Wajoq's sole access to the sea. Wajoq's complains to the Dutch at Makassar regarding Boné's arbitrary actions were given little attention. By this time, Arung Palakka had been sending soldiers to help the VOC in a campaign in Java, and the VOC did not want to risk severing their relationship with an important ally.

It was these difficulties faced by the Wajorese in their homeland which prompted them to emigrate elsewhere. While migration had always been an important part of Wajorese culture, it was particularly prominent in the aftermath of the Makassar War, when a large number of Wajorese migrants established themselves abroad in Makassar, eastern Borneo, the Lesser Sunda Islands, and the Straits of Malacca area, among other places. These diaspora communities were connected to their homeland as well as to each other by familial, commercial, political and legal ties. By the early 18th century, a sequence of Wajorese rulers had begun to take advantage of these connections to revitalize their country. Several rulers ordered their people abroad to buy weapons to rearm Wajoq. Attention was also given to commerce; one particular arung matoa, La Tenriwerrung Puanna Sangngaji (r. 1711–1713), even proclaimed it as a moral duty, noting that the people of Wajoq "could not 'stand upright' unless they sought riches". His successor, La Saléwangeng To Tenrirua (r. 1713–1736), actively supported international commerce in more practical ways. He dredged the river that leads to the capital Tosora to ease access for large boats, strengthened local industries by requiring them to appoint political representatives known as akkajenangngeng, created an official governmental post with the specific role of promoting trade, and set up a fund which can be used for investment on commerce and agriculture as well as for social security purposes.

=== Wajoq under La Maddukelleng (1730–1754) ===
Since Arung Palakka's death in 1696, none of his successors were as capable as him in maintaining Boné's hegemony over South Sulawesi. This allowed Wajorese trade to flourish without much restriction. Interaction between Wajorese diaspora communities and their homeland intensified, and it culminated in the 1730s when the exiled Wajorese La Maddukelleng came back to South Sulawesi. At first, he and his followers raided several communities in the western part of the peninsula and in the islands near Makassar. In 1736, he assumed the leadership of Pénéki (a constituent polity of Wajoq) and got involved in a confrontation with Boné. Following a retaliatory invasion from Boné, many Wajorese people came to support La Maddukelleng, and he assumed the position of arung matoa (r. 1736–1754) not long after. (Note: Noorduyn (1972, p. 61) dates his reign to 1737–1754, but according to Abidin (1985, p. 577) and Wellen (2014, p. 145), he was appointed as the arung matoa of Wajoq on November 6, 1736. Wajorese sources recount that La Maddukelleng was chosen to replace La Saléwangeng (who is reported to have voluntarily resigned), although several contemporary records indicated that he assumed the position through usurpation (Wellen 2018, p. 56).) With popular support, he led Wajoq into victory over Boné. By mid-1737 a peace agreement had been signed, and Boné was obliged to compensate for all the losses Wajoq had suffered under the rulers of Boné since the Makassar War. Liberated from Boné dominance, Wajoq assumed a hegemonic position in South Sulawesi, with Wajorese record even stating that Wajoq was recognized as the leader of the Tellumpocco at the time.

== Government and politics ==
List of rulers (Note: Adapted from Abidin (1985, pp. 574–578). Dates of reign for the first three rulers are not specified.)
Batara of Wajoq
La Tenribali
La Mataesso
La Pateddungi To Samallangiq
Arung Matoa of Wajoq
La Paléwo To Palippu	(1474–1481)
La Obbi Settiriwareq	(1481–1486)
La Tenritumpuq To Langiq	(1486–1481)
La Tadampareq Puang ri Maggalatung	(1491–1521)
La Tenripakado To Nampé	(1524–1535)
La Temassongé	(1535–1538)
La Warani To Temmagiang	(1538–1547)
La Mallageni	(1547)
La Mappapuli To Appademmeng	(1547–1564)
La Pakoko To Pabbéleq	(1564–1567)
La Mungkaceq To Uddamang	(1567–1607)
La Sangkuru Patauq Mulajaji	(1607–1610)
La Mappepulu To Appamolé	(1612–1616)
La Samaléwa To Appakiung	(1616–1621)
La Pakallongi To Alinrungi	(1621–1626)
To Mappassaungngé	(1627–1628)
La Pakallongi To Alinrungi	(1628–1636)
La Tenrilai To Uddamang	(1636–1639)
La Sigajang To Bunne	(1639–1643)
La Makkaraka To Patemmui	(1643–1648)
La Temmassongeq Puanna Daéli	(1648–1651)
La Parammaq To Réwo	(1651–1658)
La Tenrilai To Sengngeng	(1658–1670)
La Paliliq To Malu	(1670–1679)
La Pariusi Daéng Manyampaq	(1679–1699)
La Tenrisessu To Timoé	(1699–1702)
La Mattoneq To Sakkeq	(1702–1703)
La Galigo To Sunia	(1703–1712)
La Tenriwerrung Puanna Sangngaji	(1712–1715)
La Saléwangeng To Tenrirua	(1715–1736)
La Maddukelleng	(1736–1754)
La Maddanaca	(1754–1755)
La Passaung Puanna La Omoq	(1758–1761)
La Mappajung Puanna Salowo	(1761–1767)
La Malliungeng To Alléong	(1767–1770)
La Mallalengeng	(1795–1817)
La Manang To Appamadeng	(1821–1825)
La Paddengngeng Puanna Pallaguna	(1839–1845)
La Pawellangi Pajumpéroé	(1854–1859)
La Cincing Akil Ali	(1859–1885)
La Koro	(1885–1891)
La Passamulaq	(1892–1897)
Ishak Manggabarani	(1900–1916)
La Tenrioddang	(1926–1933)
Andiq Mangkonaq	(1933–1949)

As with many other Bugis states, Wajoq was a confederation of smaller political and territorial communities. These communities were related to each other as well as to the central government at Tosora in various ways, ranging from vassalage to alliance "as between brothers". The polity of Wajoq was divided into three limpo or main districts, namely Béttémpola, Tua, and Talotenreng, which represented its three original founding communities. Each limpo held power over several smaller communities that either chose to affiliate themselves with the said limpo or were conquered. Each of these communities had considerable freedom, with its own leader and customs. It can also switch allegiance between different states, and by doing so, both its people and its territory will be subject to the new state.

The paramount ruler of Wajoq was titled arung matoa. The arung matoa was chosen among the "white-blood" or nobility class. The position of arung matoa cannot be held at once with another office. It also cannot be inherited and can only be held for life as long as the ruler was deemed fit for the position. A ruler in precolonial South Sulawesi was expected to be subordinate to the state and the adat or customary law which delineates the autonomy of local communities; failure to do so may result in removal from office. The arung matoa La Samaléwa To Appakiung (r. 1612–1616), for example, was deposed by his people, reportedly because of his arbitrary actions.

In running the day-to-day administration of Wajoq, the arung matoa was assisted by three pairs of civilian and military leaders, each pair representing one of the three limpo. The civilian leader of a limpo was called a ranreng or regent, while the military leader was called a baté lompo (lit. "great banner") or standard bearer. The titles of the baté lompo were taken from the banner they carried: Pilla or "Scarlet" for Béttémpola, Patola or "Multi-colored" for Talotenreng, and Cakkuridi or "Yellow" for Tua. Each of the ranreng and baté lompo were at least as powerful as the arung matoa; together, these seven officials formed the state's highest governing body, known as Petta Wajoq.

The central governing council of Wajoq consisted of 40 officials, collectively called the Arung Patampulu (lit. "Forty Lords"), of which the arung matoa was a member as well as the head. The whole members only convened on certain occasions, including the election of a new arung matoa. The power of Arung Patampulu, in turn, was balanced by three non-noble officials known as punggawa, who were elected among the elders of each district. These punggawa had considerable power. According to Brooke:

The powers of these pangawas [sic], or tribunes of the people, is considerable. With them only it rests to summon a meeting of the council of forty. They possess the right of veto to the appointment of an aru matoah [sic]. Their command alone is a legal summons to war, no chief or body having right, or even authority, to call the freemen to the field.

— James Brooke

In addition to having punggawa as the formal permanent representation in the government, "respectable" commoners and village heads were also entitled to participate in the occasional extraordinary deliberative assembly which might be held in case the Arung Patampulu could not agree on the best way to resolve certain issues. These commoners may discuss and give input to the government on the best way to resolve these issues, although the ultimate decision in this kind of situations rested in the hands of arung matoa.

== Culture and society ==
Wajorese texts often reiterate that "the people of Wajoq are free", and that their only master is the customary law, which is based on consensus. The concept of the "freedoms of Wajoq" included, among others: freedom of expressing opinions, freedom to act based on one's intention, freedom of movement, freedom of contract, and the freedom from unjust punishment. These "freedoms", however, had limitations and do not necessarily apply to the whole population.

Bugis women in the precolonial states of South Sulawesi were routinely involved in many aspects of the society. Women were also actively involved in the government. One 19th-century observer states that the women of South Sulawesi were commonly "consulted by the men on all public affairs" and were often "raised to the throne, [even] when the monarchy is elective". The British adventurer James Brooke (future Rajah of Sarawak), notes that at the time of his visit to Wajoq in 1840, four out of six members of Petta Ennengngé were women, who frequently "appear in public like the men; ride, rule, and visit even foreigners, without the knowledge or consent of their husbands."

== Economy ==
Wajoq was the source of most South Sulawesi overseas merchants between late 17th and late 19th centuries. Wajorese commerce extended as far as Sumatra, Cambodia, and New Guinea. Throughout the Maritime Southeast Asia, Wajorese and other Bugis merchants acted as intermediaries between large and small trading nations. Wajorese trade flourished in part because of deliberate support from the government at Wajoq as well as from Wajorese communities abroad. Leaders of Wajorese overseas communities regularly convened to advance their interest. One such conference in the early 18th century saw the codification of laws regulating Wajorese commerce and navigation, popularly called the Ammana Gappa's law code, after the then leader of the Wajorese community in Makassar. These laws set up frameworks for managing credit and debts as well as regulating other kinds of business relationships, providing ways to resolve conflict and giving Wajorese merchants advantages over merchants from other groups in Maritime Southeast Asia. Such a law code, according to historian Kathryn Wellen, is "highly unusual, if not unique, for early modern insular Southeast Asia".

The government financially supported Wajorese merchants by providing monetary loans, taken from the fund established by La Saléwangeng. Borrowers were obliged to return the principals alongside parts of their profits. The profits would then be used to further Wajoq's interest, such as building armaments or renovating the state's mosque. This system allowed a large segment of Wajorese population to participate in commerce while also utilizing their economic power for the benefit of the society as a whole.

== See also ==
- Early history of Gowa and Talloq
