= Enrekang =

Enrekang may refer to:

- Enrekang language, an Austronesian language spoken on Sulawesi, Indonesia
- Enrekang Regency, a regency of South Sulawesi Province of Indonesia
