= Maiwa =

Maiwa may refer to:

- Maiwa, Indonesia, a district in Sulawesi, Indonesia
- Maiwa language (Indonesia), a language of Sulawesi, Indonesia
- Maiwa language (Papuan), a language of Papua New Guinea

== See also ==
- Maiwa's Revenge, an English novel
- Maewa railway station, in New Zealand
- Maiva, a genus of butterflies
- Malwa, a region in India
