= Pepandungan =

- Location in South Sulawesi and Indonesia Pepandungan (Indonesia)
- Coordinates: 3°24′18.1″S 120°0′51.3″E
- Country: Indonesia
- Province: South Sulawesi
- Regency: Enrekang Regency
- District: Baraka District
- Elevation: 7,425 ft (2,263 m)

Population (2010)
  - Total: 1,208
- Time zone: UTC+8 (Indonesia Central Standard Time)

Pepandungan is a village in Baraka district, Enrekang Regency in South Sulawesi province, Indonesia. Its population is 1208.

== Climate ==
Pepandungan has a subtropical highland climate (Cfb) with heavy to very heavy rainfall from November to June and moderate rainfall from July to October.

Climate data for Pepandungan
Month	Jan	Feb	Mar	Apr	May	Jun	Jul	Aug	Sep	Oct	Nov	Dec	Year
Mean daily maximum °C (°F)	18.9 (66.0)	19.1 (66.4)	19.2 (66.6)	18.9 (66.0)	18.4 (65.1)	17.3 (63.1)	16.7 (62.1)	17.6 (63.7)	18.8 (65.8)	20.1 (68.2)	19.6 (67.3)	19.1 (66.4)	18.6 (65.6)
Daily mean °C (°F)	14.7 (58.5)	14.8 (58.6)	14.9 (58.8)	14.8 (58.6)	14.8 (58.6)	13.9 (57.0)	13.3 (55.9)	13.6 (56.5)	14.2 (57.6)	15.2 (59.4)	15.1 (59.2)	14.9 (58.8)	14.5 (58.1)
Mean daily minimum °C (°F)	10.6 (51.1)	10.6 (51.1)	10.7 (51.3)	10.7 (51.3)	11.2 (52.2)	10.6 (51.1)	9.9 (49.8)	9.7 (49.5)	9.7 (49.5)	10.3 (50.5)	10.6 (51.1)	10.7 (51.3)	10.4 (50.8)
Average rainfall mm (inches)	485 (19.1)	443 (17.4)	318 (12.5)	316 (12.4)	226 (8.9)	167 (6.6)	102 (4.0)	116 (4.6)	68 (2.7)	97 (3.8)	204 (8.0)	384 (15.1)	2,926 (115.1)
Source: Climate-Data.org
