= Karaeng Matoaya =

Sultan Abullah of Tallo, or Karaeng Matoaya (c. 1573–1636) was the ruler of Tallo and the bicara-butta (first minister) of Gowa from 1593 until his death. He gained power after overthrowing Tunipasuluq, and transformed Makassar into one of the main trading centers of Eastern Indonesia and the wider Southeast Asian trading network. He converted to Islam around 1605, adopted an Islamic name "Abdullah Awwal al-Islam" and the Islamization of Gowa and Tallo subsequently happened under his influence.

== Biography ==
On the eve of Friday September 22, 1605 Karaeng Matoaya took the shahada and converted to Islam. Karaeng Matoaya was described as a pious Muslim by the Chronicle of Goa and Talloq, and was said to have followed all the prescriptions of Muslim law. According to the chronicle, the people of Goa had all been converted to Islam two years later. However, despite the conversion, several Christian churches existed in Mataoya's kingdom and one of his wives was Christian.

During his reign, trade expanded and many local and foreign merchants traded goods within the kingdom. Matoaya himself highly valued trade, reportedly telling the Dutch VOC that "God made the land and the sea. The land he divided among men and the sea he gave in common. It has never been heard that anyone should be forbidden to sail the seas" in response to the VOC requesting him to prevent Portuguese merchants from entering his kingdom.

Three years after converting to Islam Matoaya sent an envoy to his brother, King of Bone, and asked him to perform the shahada and profess himself a Muslim. However, the request was firmly rejected by the King of Bone. Upon hearing this Matoaya launched the Islamic wars, also called the bunduq kasallannganga, against the neighboring non-Muslim kingdoms to compel them to accept Islam. The wars resulted in the conversion of the rulers of southwest Sulawesi, with Bone being converted in 1611. The conquered population retained their beliefs, with Matoaya later on dispatching mystics and missionaries to proselytize among them. While religion played a significant factor, political and economic concerns for Matoaya also spurred the conquests. Additionally, the conquests of Matoaya had precedents in the area long before the rise of Islam, where similar punishments and subjugation status of the defeated states paralleled that of pre-Islamic times.
