= Kingdom of Siang =

Siang was a major kingdom on the South Sulawesi peninsula (in modern-day Indonesia) from the 10th to the 16th century, located in what is now Pangkajene and Islands Regency. By the time it first appeared in the European written records in the 1540s, it was the most important kingdom on the west coast of South Sulawesi, with smaller kingdoms acknowledging its authority. A Portuguese observer Manoel Pinto estimated that its capital had a population of about 40,000 in 1545. Its power declined in the middle of the sixteenth century with the rise of Gowa and Talloq, and it was no longer heard of by the end of the century.

== Bibliography ==
- Andaya, Leonard Y. (1981). The Heritage of Arung Palakka: A History of South Sulawesi (Celebes) in the Seventeenth Century. 500 S State St, Ann Arbor, MI 48109, USA: University of Michigan. ISBN 978-9024724635.
