= Lake Sidenreng =

Lake in South Sulawesi, Indonesia

Coordinates: 3°59′S 119°52′E

- Interactive map of Lake Sidenreng
- Location: Sulawesi Selatan, Indonesia
- Basin countries: Indonesia

Lake Sidenreng is a lake in Sulawesi Selatan, Indonesia. This lake is connected to Tempe Lake via a small channel. Lake Sidenreng has some water facilities. The location is surrounded by mountains.
