= Tumapaqrisiq Kallonna =

Tumapaqrisiq Kallonna (also spelled Tumapa'risi' Kallonna or Tumaparisi Kallonna) was a karaeng or monarch of early Gowa, ruling from c. 1511 to late 1546, and the first ruler described in detail by the Gowa Chronicle. He introduced written records and laws into the kingdom, and began its expansion by conquering and establishing ties with its Makassar neighbours. He was also credited with internal reforms, including the introduction of the sabannaraq or harbormaster, the first bureaucratic post in the kingdom. Under the reigns of his sons and other descendants in the sixteenth century, Gowa continued its expansion and reforms and would become the preeminent power of the South Sulawesi Peninsula.

== Bibliography ==
- Bulbeck, Francis David (March 1992). A Tale of Two Kingdoms: The Historical Archaeology of Gowa and Tallok, South Sulawesi, Indonesia (PhD). Australian National University.
- Cummings, William P. (January 1, 2007). A Chain of Kings: The Makassarese Chronicles of Gowa and Talloq. KITLV Press. ISBN 978-9067182874.
