= Maiwa, Indonesia =

Maiwa
- District
- Location in Sulawesi
- Coordinates: 3°45′1″S 119°51′42″E
- Country: Indonesia
- Province: South Sulawesi
- Regency: Enrekang Regency

Area
  - Total: 392.82 km^{2} (151.67 sq mi)

Population (mid 2023 estimate)
  - Total: 28,233
  - Density: 71.873/km^{2} (186.15/sq mi)
- Time zone: UTC+7 (WIB)

Maiwa is a district (kecamatan) of Enrekang Regency (kabupaten) in South Sulawesi Province of Indonesia. It is divided into one urban village (kelurahan) - Bangkala - and 21 rural villages (desa), all listed below with their populations as at mid 2022:

- Patondon Salu (population 2,695)
- Salo Dua (1,246)
- Boiya (1,229)
- Tuncung (1,527)
- Bangkala (4,335)
- Mangkawani (1,419)
- Botto Mallangga (2,089)
- Batu Mila (also known as Malino; population 1,806)
- Puncak Harapan (1,026)
- Tapong (1,033)
- Palakka (700)
- Pasang (828)
- Baringin (1,145)
- Lebani (891)
- Matajang (1,055)
- Limbuang (402)
- Ongko (966)
- Pariwang (514)
- Kaluppang (1,042)
- Paladang (1,039)
- Labuku (699)
- Tanete (547)
