= Enrekang Regency =

Regency in South Sulawesi, Indonesia

Coordinates: 3°33′52″S 119°46′29″E

Enrekang Regency Kabupaten Enrekang
- Regency
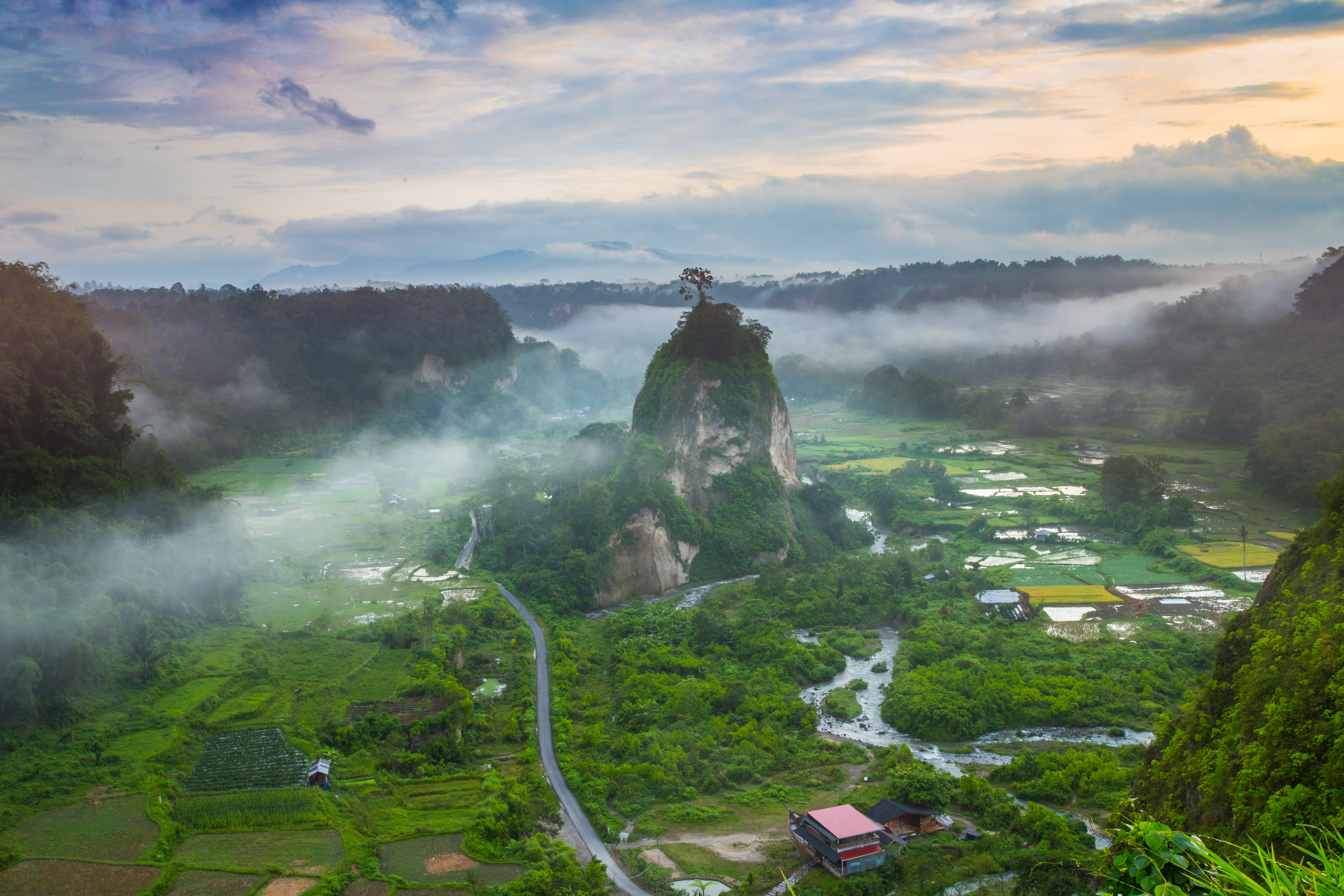
- Landscape of Enrekang

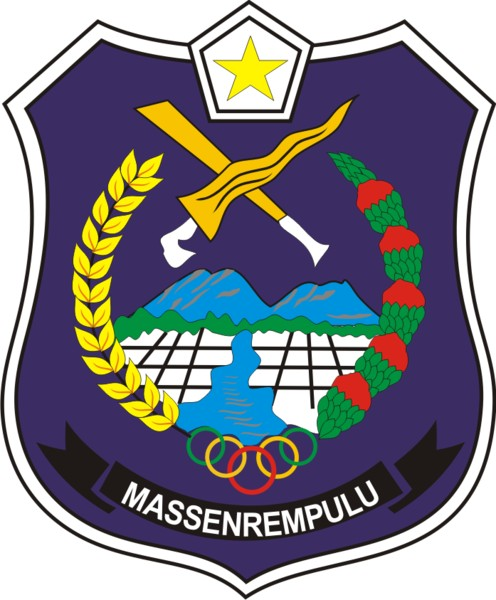
- Coat of arms
- Motto: Massenrempulu (Side of the mountain or along the mountain)
- Location within South Sulawesi
- Country: Indonesia
- Province: South Sulawesi
- Capital: Enrekang

Government
  - Regent: Muhammad Yusuf Ritangnga
  - Vice Regent: Andi Tenri Liwang La Tinro

Area
  - Total: 1,821.53 km^{2} (703.30 sq mi)

Population (mid 2025 estimate)
  - Total: 232,865
  - Density: 127.840/km^{2} (331.105/sq mi)
- Time zone: UTC+8 (WITA)

Enrekang Regency (Enrekang, Duri, and Maiwa: Endekan, Buginese: ᨕᨙᨋᨙᨀ, romanized: Énrékang) is an inland regency of South Sulawesi Province of Indonesia. It covers an area of 1,821.53 km^{2} and had a population of 190,175 at the 2010 census and 225,172 at the 2020 census; the official estimate as at mid 2025 was 232,815 (comprising 118,330 males and 114,535 females). The principal town lies at Enrekang.

== Administrative districts ==
Enrekang Regency comprises twelve administrative districts (Kecamatan), tabulated below with their areas and their populations at the 2010 census and the 2020 census, together with the official estimates as at end 2025. The table also includes the locations of the district administrative centres, the number of administrative villages in each district (totaling 112 rural desa and 17 urban kelurahan), and its post code.

Kode Wilayah	Name of District (kecamatan)	Area in km^{2}	Pop'n census 2010	Pop'n census 2020	Pop'n Estimate mid 2025	Admin centre	No. of desa	No. of kelu- rahan	Post code
73.16.01	Maiwa	400.74	23,119	27,880	28,927	Bangkala	21	1 ^{(a)}	91760
73.16.06	Bungin	241.53	4,345	5,508	5,789	Bungin	6	-	91761
73.16.02	Enrekang	296.91	30,568	37,080	37,895	Juppandang	12	6 ^{(b)}	91711 & 91712
73.16.07	Cendana	92.90	8,695	9,935	10,285	Cendana	7	-	91711
73.16.03	Baraka	162.30	21,201	23,539	24,665	Baraka	12	3 ^{(c)}	91753
73.16.10	Buntu Batu	129.15	12,779	15,248	16,343	Pasui	8	-	91750
73.16.04	Anggeraja	127.87	23,825	28,468	30,216	Lakawan	12	3 ^{(d)}	91752
73.16.09	Malua	41.17	7,641	9,154	9,757	Malua	7	1 ^{(e)}	91751
73.16.05	Alla	35.34	20,657	24,116	25,682	Kambiolangi	5	3 ^{(f)}	91754
73.16.08	Curio	181.97	14,841	17,816	18,787	Curio	11	-	91756
73.16.11	Masalle	69.76	12,298	14,612	15,454	Masalle	6	-	91757
73.16.12	Baroko	41.90	10,279	11,816	12,368	Baroko	5	-	91755
	Totals	1,821.53	190,248	225,172	236,168	Enrekang	112	17	

Notes: (a) the kelurahan is Bangkala. (b) comprising Galonta, Juppandang, Leoran, Lewaja, Puserren and Tuara.
(c) comprising Balla, Baraka and Tomenawa. (d) comprising Lakawan, Mataran and Tanete.
(e) the kelurahan is Malua. (f) comprising Buntu Sugi, Kalosi and Kambiolangi.

== Ethnic groups and languages ==
While the majority of inhabitants of Enrekang Regency use the Indonesian language, the local inhabitants generally identify as being with the Massenrempulu ethnic group and speak languages related to that group. There are 4 of these languages, each comprising a number of local dialects. The Duri language is the language in the north of the regency (mainly in Baraka, Buntu Batu, Anggeraja, Malua, Alla, Curio, Masalle and Baroko Districts), but is influenced by the Toraja language of the north of the province. The languages spoken further south in the regency are Enrekang (mainly in Enrekang and Cendana Districts, as well as further west in Batu Lappa and Lembang Districts in the north of neighbouring Pinrang Regency) and Maiwa (mainly in Maiwa and Bungin Districts). The fourth Massenrempulu language is Malimpung, which is mainly spoken further to the southwest in Pinrang Regency, and is influenced by the Bugis language spoken in the main part of the peninsula.

== Climate ==
Enrekang has a tropical rainforest climate (Af) with heavy rainfall year-round. The following climate data is for the town of Enrekang.

Climate data for Enrekang
Month	Jan	Feb	Mar	Apr	May	Jun	Jul	Aug	Sep	Oct	Nov	Dec	Year
Mean daily maximum °C (°F)	29.9 (85.8)	30.0 (86.0)	30.4 (86.7)	30.7 (87.3)	30.8 (87.4)	30.2 (86.4)	30.0 (86.0)	30.9 (87.6)	31.3 (88.3)	31.9 (89.4)	31.2 (88.2)	30.3 (86.5)	30.6 (87.1)
Daily mean °C (°F)	26.4 (79.5)	26.5 (79.7)	26.7 (80.1)	26.8 (80.2)	27.0 (80.6)	26.3 (79.3)	25.7 (78.3)	26.2 (79.2)	26.5 (79.7)	27.2 (81.0)	27.1 (80.8)	26.6 (79.9)	26.6 (79.9)
Mean daily minimum °C (°F)	22.9 (73.2)	23.1 (73.6)	23.0 (73.4)	23.0 (73.4)	23.2 (73.8)	22.4 (72.3)	21.4 (70.5)	21.5 (70.7)	21.7 (71.1)	22.5 (72.5)	23.0 (73.4)	23.0 (73.4)	22.6 (72.6)
Average rainfall mm (inches)	316 (12.4)	171 (6.7)	184 (7.2)	295 (11.6)	235 (9.3)	175 (6.9)	140 (5.5)	138 (5.4)	195 (7.7)	157 (6.2)	168 (6.6)	236 (9.3)	2,410 (94.8)
Source: Climate-Data.org
