= Kingdom of Tallo =

Former kingdom in South Sulawesi

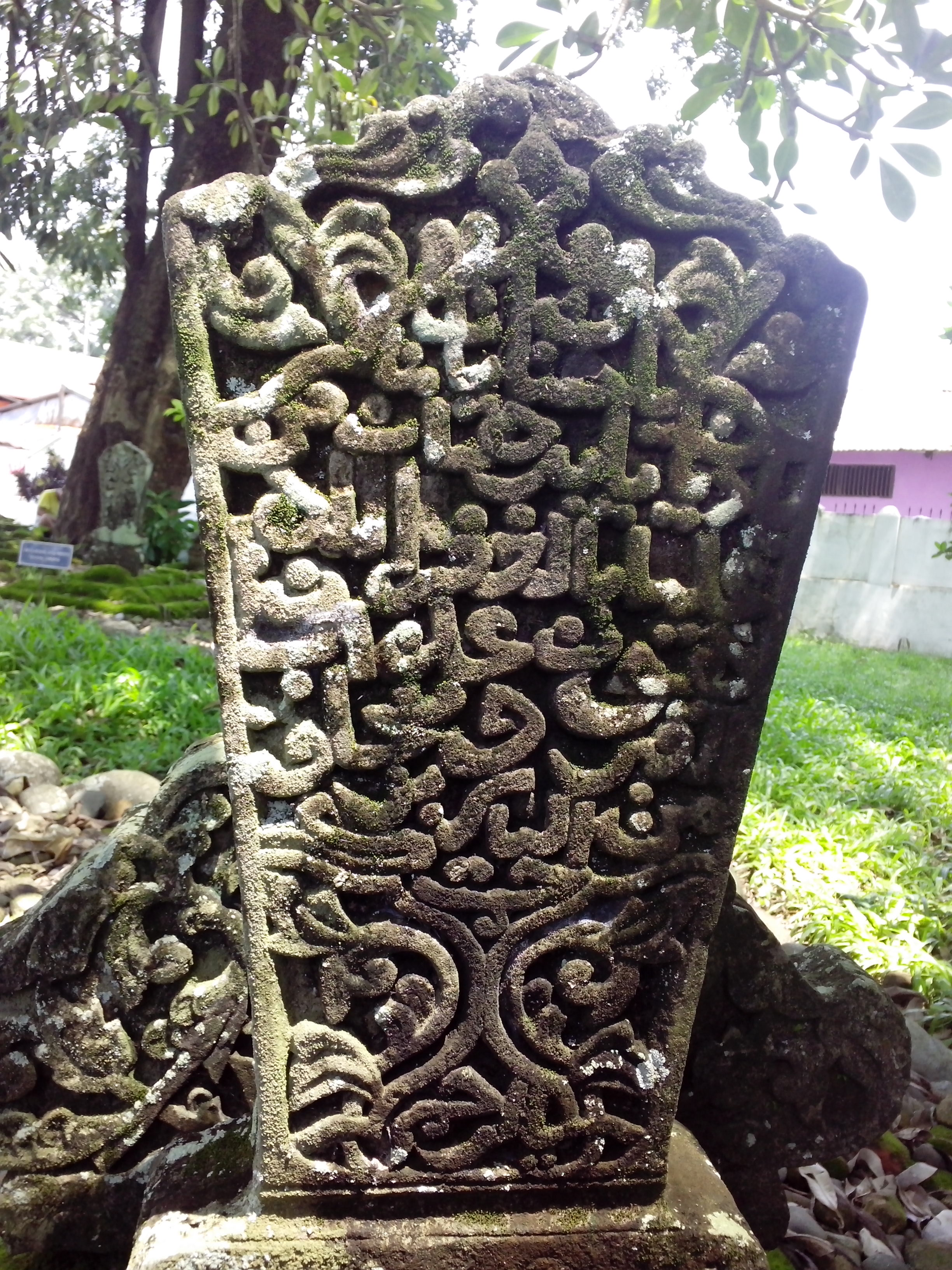
One of gravestones in Kings of Tallo Burial Site carved in Arabic script.

The Kingdom of Talloʼ was one of the two kingdoms of Makassar in South Sulawesi from the 15th century to 1856. The state stood in a close political relation to the Sultanate of Gowa. After the Islamization of the Gowa and Tallo kingdoms in the early 17th century, they were usually collectively known as the Makassar Kingdom.

== Early history ==
The Kingdom of Tallo dates from the mid-15th century. When the 6th King of Gowa, Tunatangka'lopi, died, he was succeeded as the 7th King of Gowa by his eldest son Batara Gowa Tuminanga ri Paralakkenna, while his brother Karaeng Loe ri Sero ruled part of the region as the first King of Tallo. The Kingdom of Tallo region included Saumata, Pannampu, Moncong Loe, and Parang Loe.

The two kingdoms of Tallo and Gowa subsequently engaged each other in combat and competition, until Tallo was defeated. During the reign of the 10th King of Gowa, Tunipalangga Ulaweng, and the 4th King of Tallo, Daeng Padulu (c. 1540–1576), an agreement was reached. This was known as Rua karaeng se're ata (two kings but one people). The agreement regulated the fellowship so that the King of Gowa became Sombaya (highest king) while the King of Tallo became the 'blind Speaker' of the fellowship of the two kingdoms. Since then, the Kingdom of Tallo was always involved in and supported the expansion of the Sultanate of Gowa in South Sulawesi and beyond. The elite of the kingdom accepted Islam in 1605, and strove to disseminate the creed in different directions in the Indonesian Archipelago.

== Later history ==
Among the prominent Tallo rulers was Karaeng Matoaya (1593–1623) and his son Karaeng Pattingalloang (1641–1654), who were educated individuals and reliable prime ministers, and brought the Makassar Kingdom to its peak of power. During this period Makassarese power encompassed most of Sulawesi, East Kalimantan, Lombok, Sumbawa, and some parts of Maluku and Timor. However, the expansion inevitably led to conflicts with the Dutch East India Company based on Java. At the time when Harunarrasyid was King of Tallo (1654–1673) and Hasanuddin ruled Gowa, a major war broke out. The Dutch force was supported by Arung Palakka, a prince from Bone. Makassar was defeated in 1667 and 1669 and formally lost its far-flung empire. The ensuing Treaty of Bongaya regulated political affairs in the region, and ensured the presence of the Dutch in South Sulawesi. The frustrated Harunarrasyid went over with a fleet to Sumbawa and died there in 1673. In the following decades several Tallo princes led restless lives as overseas sea migrants, often turning to piracy and raiding. The Tallo homeland existed as a separate state under Dutch suzerainty until 1856 when the 23rd and last king, La Makkarumpa Daeng Parani, had to step down.

Although Tallo was now placed directly under the colonial government, the territory kept a sense of own identity, even after the winning of Indonesian Independence in 1949. In the present time, Karaeng H Andi Abdul Rauf Maro Daeng Marewa, also known as Karaeng Rewa, is the traditional society leader.

== List of rulers ==
List of rulers of Tallo:

- Karaeng Loe ri Sero’, Tuniawanga ri Sero mid-15th century
- Karaeng Tunilabu ri Suriwa (son) c. 1500
- I Mangayoangberang Karaeng Pasi’, posthumously titled Karaeng Tunipasuru’ ri Tallo’ (son) ?-c. 1540/43
- I Mappatakakatana Daeng Padulu’ Karaeng Pattingalloang, posthumously titled Tumenanga ri Makkoayang (son) 1540/43-1576
- I Sambo Daeng Niasseng Karaeng Pattingalloang Karaeng Bainea (daughter) 1576–90
- I Tepukaraeng Daeng Parabbung, posthumously titled Karaeng Tunipasulu’ (son) 1590–1593
- I Mallingkang Daeng Manyonri Karaeng Kanjilo Karaeng Sigeri Karaeng ri Tallo Karaeng Matoaya Sultan Abdullah Awwalul Islam, posthumously titled Tumamenang ri Agamana (uncle) 1593–1623
- I Manginyarrang Daeng Makkio Karaeng Kanjilo Sultan Abdul Jafar Muzaffar Tumammalinga ri Timoro, posthumously titled Tumenanga ri Tallo’ (son) 1623–1641
- I Mangadacinna I Daeng Ba’le Karaeng Pattingalloang Sultan Mahmud, posthumously titled Tumenanga ri Bontobiraeng (brother) 1641–1654
- I Mappaiyo Daeng Mannyauru’ Sultan Harun Al Rasyid, posthumously titled Tumenanga ri Lampana (son of Abdul Jafar Muzaffar) 1654–1673
- I Mappincara Daeng Mattinri Karaeng Kanjilo Sultan Abdul Kadir, posthumously titled Tumenanga ri Pasi’ (son) 1673–1709
- I Mappau’rangi Daeng Mannuntungi Karaeng Boddia, Sultan Sirajuddin, posthumously titled Tumenanga ri Tallo’ (son) 1709–1714
- I Manrabbia Daeng Ma’nassa Karaeng Kanjilo, Sultan Najmuddin, posthumously titled Tumenanga ri Jawayya (son) 1714–1729
- I Mappau’rangi Daeng Mannuntungi Karaeng Boddia, Sultan Sirajuddin, posthumously titled Tumenanga ri Tallo’ (second time) 1729–1739
- Safiuddin Karaeng Limpangang (son) 1739–1760
- Tu Timoka (grandson of Najmuddin) 1760–1761
- Abdul Qadir Karaeng Majannang (grandson of Karaeng Patingalloang) 1761–67
- Sitti Saleh I (queen, from Taeng) 1767–1777
- interregnum 1777-1814
- Sitti Saleh II (daughter of Safiuddin) 1814–1824
- Abdul Rauf Karaeng Limbangparang (brother) 1824–1825
- I Kumala Abdul Kadir (son) 1825
- La Odanriu Karaeng Katangka (uncle) 1825–1845
- Aisyah (sister) 1845–1850
- La Makkarumpa Daeng Parani (grandson of La Odanriu) 1850-1856

== Family tree ==
Family tree of Tallo monarchs

^{(1)} Loe ri Sero’
^{(2)} Tunilabu ri Suriwa’
^{(3)} Tunipasuru’ ri Tallo’
^{(4)} Pattingalloang
^{(5)} Bainea	^{(7)} Abdullah; Awwalul Islam
^{(6)} Tunipasulu’	^{(8)} Abdul Jafar; Muzaffar	^{(9)} Mahmud
^{(10)} Harun; Al Rasyid	Child
^{(11)} Abdul Kadir I	^{(16)} Abdul Kadir II	^{(17)} Sitti Saleh I
^{(12)} Sirajuddin
^{(13)} Najmuddin	^{(14)} Safiuddin
Child	^{(18)} Sitti Saleh II	^{(19)} Abdul Rauf	^{(21)} Katangka	^{(22)} Aisyah
^{(15)} Tu Timoka	^{(20)} Abdul Kadir III	Child
^{(23)} Parani
