= Timeline of Makassar =

The following is a timeline of the history of and major events involving the city of Makassar, Indonesia.

== Pre-colonial period ==
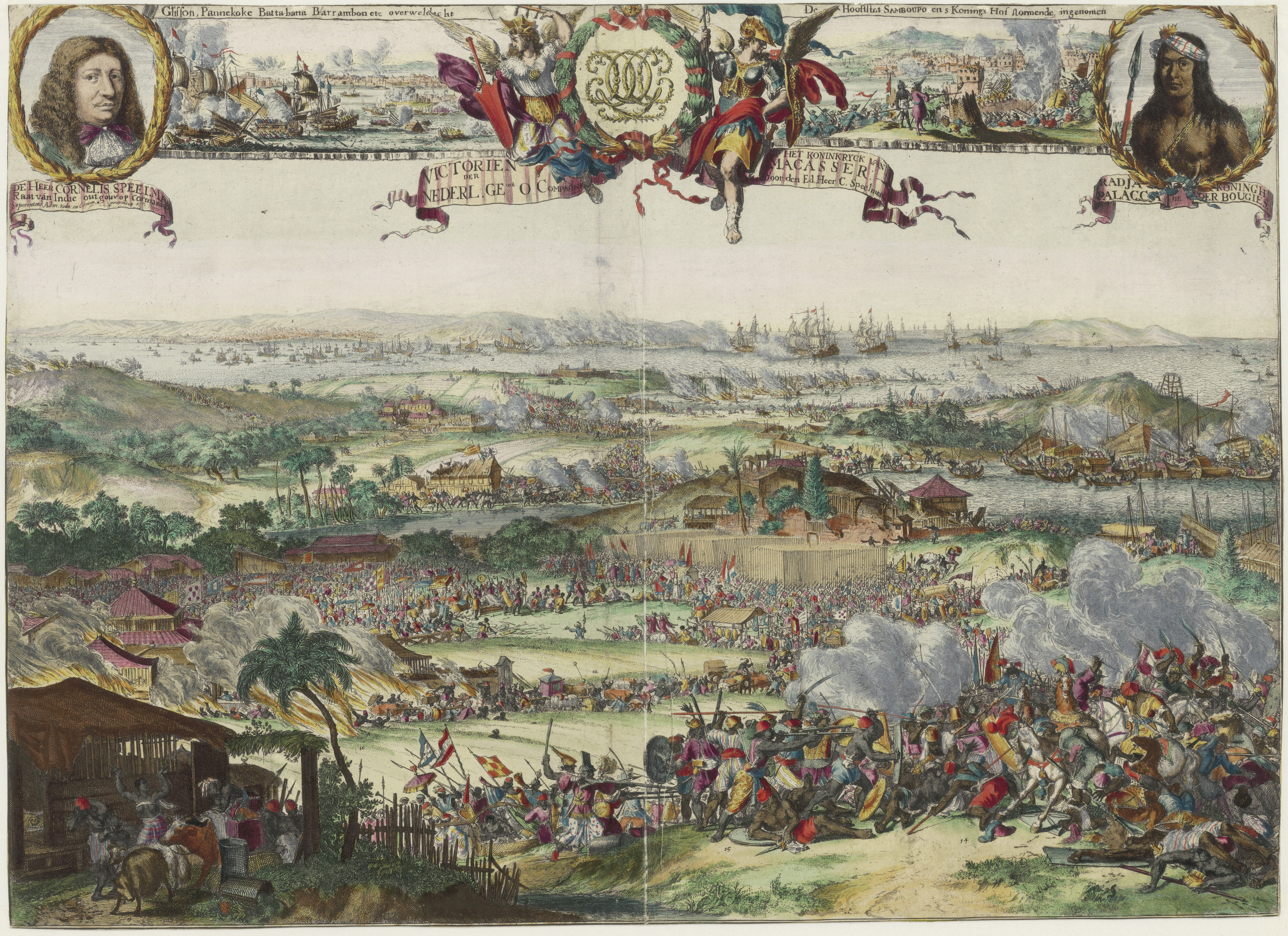
The conquest of Macassar by Speelman from 1666 to 1669, contemporary painting.

- 1365 – The Majapahit manuscript Nagarakretagama mentions Makassar as a part of Majapahit's conquered territories, as one of the first written mentions of Makassar.
- Late 15th century – The port of Bandar Tallo developed at the mouth of the Tallo River, within present-day Makassar.
- c. 1513 – Portuguese traveler Tomé Pires mentions Makassar in his Suma Oriental, though he described the whole island of Sulawesi as "Makassar".
- 1544 – A Portuguese delegation was dispatched from Portuguese Malacca to open trade (mainly in sandalwood) with Makassar.
- 1545 – A stone and clay fort, Fort Ujungpandang, was constructed by the Sultan of Gowa in modern Makassar.
- c. 1605 – The Dutch established a permanent trading presence in Makassar.
- 9 November 1607 – Monarchs of Gowa and Tallo adopted Islam and announced the Islamisation of their subjects. Celebrated today as Makassar's founding date.
- 1613 – An English factory was established in Makassar by John Jourdain of the English East India Company.
- 1615:
  - Trade between Makassar and Spanish Manila commenced.
  - Makassar's population was estimated to reach 25,000.
- 1618 – The Danish East India Company established a factory in Makassar.
- 1619 – Chinese merchants began to operate in Makassar.
- 1622 – French traders establish their presence in Makassar.
- 1634–1635 – Fort Ujungpandang was further expanded and fortified.
- 1636 – Makassar was struck by a "plague" epidemic, which reportedly killed 60 thousand people within 40 days.
- 1641 – Following the Dutch conquest of Portuguese Malacca, a large number of Portuguese inhabitants of the city relocated to Makassar. By the mid-century, the city was recorded to have around three thousand Catholics, mostly Portuguese.
- 1650s – A permanent agent of the Golconda Sultanate operated in the city.
- 1666–1669 – The Makassar War:
  - 18 November 1667 – Fort Ujungpandang was ceded to the Dutch under the Treaty of Bongaya, and renamed Fort Rotterdam. The treaty also stipulated for the removal of the English factory from the city.

== Colonial period ==
View of the city of Makassar, Sampoupo, 1747–1779

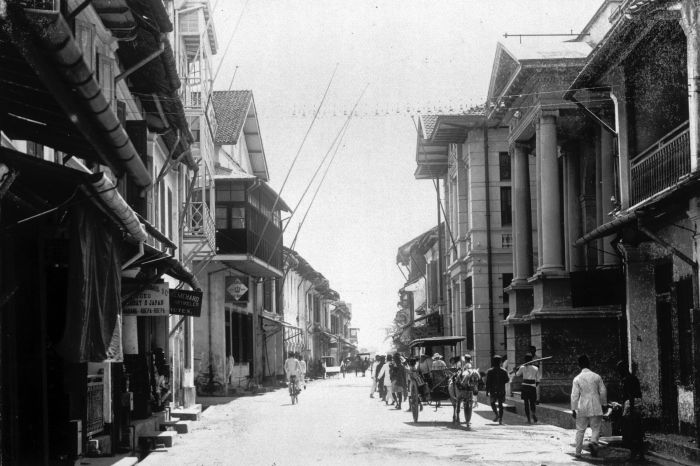
Makassar's market street, early 20th century.

- Late 17th century – The Tianhou temple (today Ibu Agung Bahari Vihāra) was built by Makassar's Kapitan Cina Ongwatko.
- 1730s – Makassar was opened to Chinese merchants, boosting the tripang trade in the Spermonde Archipelago and leading Makassarese sailors to search for the commodity as far as Australia.
- June 1814 – British forces launched an expedition to Makassar against the Sultanate of Bone.
- 1824 – Governor-General Godert van der Capellen visited Makassar to conduct negotiations with various rulers in South Sulawesi. Bone's refusal to renew the Treaty of Bongaya led to the outbreak of the First Bone War shortly after his departure from the city.
- 1846 – Makassar became a free port instead of a Dutch-monopolized port, boosting its economy.
- 5 January 1861 – The Dutch-language Macassaarsch Weekblad began publication, becoming the first newspaper in Makassar.
- 1873 – Italian botanist Odoardo Beccari, during his stay in Makassar, photographed Aboriginal Australians residing in the city.
- 14 October 1882 – The weekly newspaper Mata Hari began publication in Makassar as its first Malay-language newspaper.
- 1893 – The Babus Firdaus mosque, the oldest surviving mosque in Makassar, was built.
- 1900 – The oldest surviving church in Makassar (today the Sacred Heart Cathedral) was opened.
- 1905 – Makassar's population was given in a census as 26,145.
- 1906 – Makassar was established administratively as a city under the colonial government.
- 2 November 1915 – The Makassaaresche Voetbal Bond, predecessor of modern football club PSM Makassar, was founded.
- 1920 – Makassar's population was given in a census as 56,718.
- 1 July 1922 – The 47 kilometres (29 mi) Makassar–Takalar railway was opened, becoming Makassar and Sulawesi's first railway line. Due to the Great Depression, it had ceased operations by 1930.
- 1930 – Makassar's population was given in a census as 84,855.
- 27 September 1937 – The Kadieng Airfield, predecessor of the modern Sultan Hasanuddin International Airport, was opened.
- 9 February 1942 – After repulsing an Allied fleet in the Battle of Makassar Strait, Japanese forces landed in and occupied Makassar.
- 11 December 1943 – Makassar was bombed by B-24 Liberator bombers of the Fifth Air Force.

== Indonesian period ==
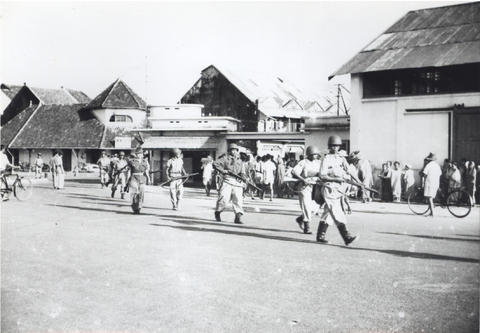
Indonesian Army soldiers in Makassar after the uprising, 1950.

- 21 September 1945 – Australian troops occupy Makassar after the surrender of Japan before handing over control to the Dutch.
- December 1946 – Makassar became the capital of the newly declared State of East Indonesia.
- 1950
  - April – Makassar Uprising: a failed revolt by former KNIL soldiers against the incorporation of East Indonesia into the Republic of Indonesia.
  - 20 June – Kodam VII/Wirabuana, a regional command of the Indonesian Army, was established with its headquarters in Makassar.
- 10 September 1956 – The Hasanuddin University was founded through a merger of two branches of the University of Indonesia in Makassar which had been founded in 1947 and 1952.
- 27 September – 6 October 1957 – The 4th National Sports Week was held in Makassar.
- 1971 – Makassar was officially renamed to Ujungpandang.
- 1998 – A toll road began operations in Ujungpandang.

=== Post-1998 ===
- 13 October 1999 – The city's name reverted to Makassar.
- 5 December 2002 – A bombing at a McDonald's restaurant in Makassar killed three people.
- 29 October 2008 – First direct mayoral election in Makassar, won by Ilham Arief Sirajuddin.
- 22 March 2016 – Australia established a Consulate-General in Makassar.
- 27 June 2018 – The 2018 Makassar mayoral election marked the first "blank box" victory in Indonesian electoral history.
- 28 March 2021 – A suicide bombing at the Makassar Cathedral injured 20 people, in addition to the deaths of the two suicide bombers.
- 29 March 2023 – President Joko Widodo inaugurated the Makassar–Parepare railway, the first leg of the planned Trans-Sulawesi Railway.
- 29 August 2025 – Following a protest held in Makassar as part of nationwide protests, a group of rioters set fire to Makassar's city legislature building, resulting in the deaths of three people.
