= Makassar War =

Military conquest by the Dutch to Sulawesi

- Part of the Dutch colonial campaigns in Asia
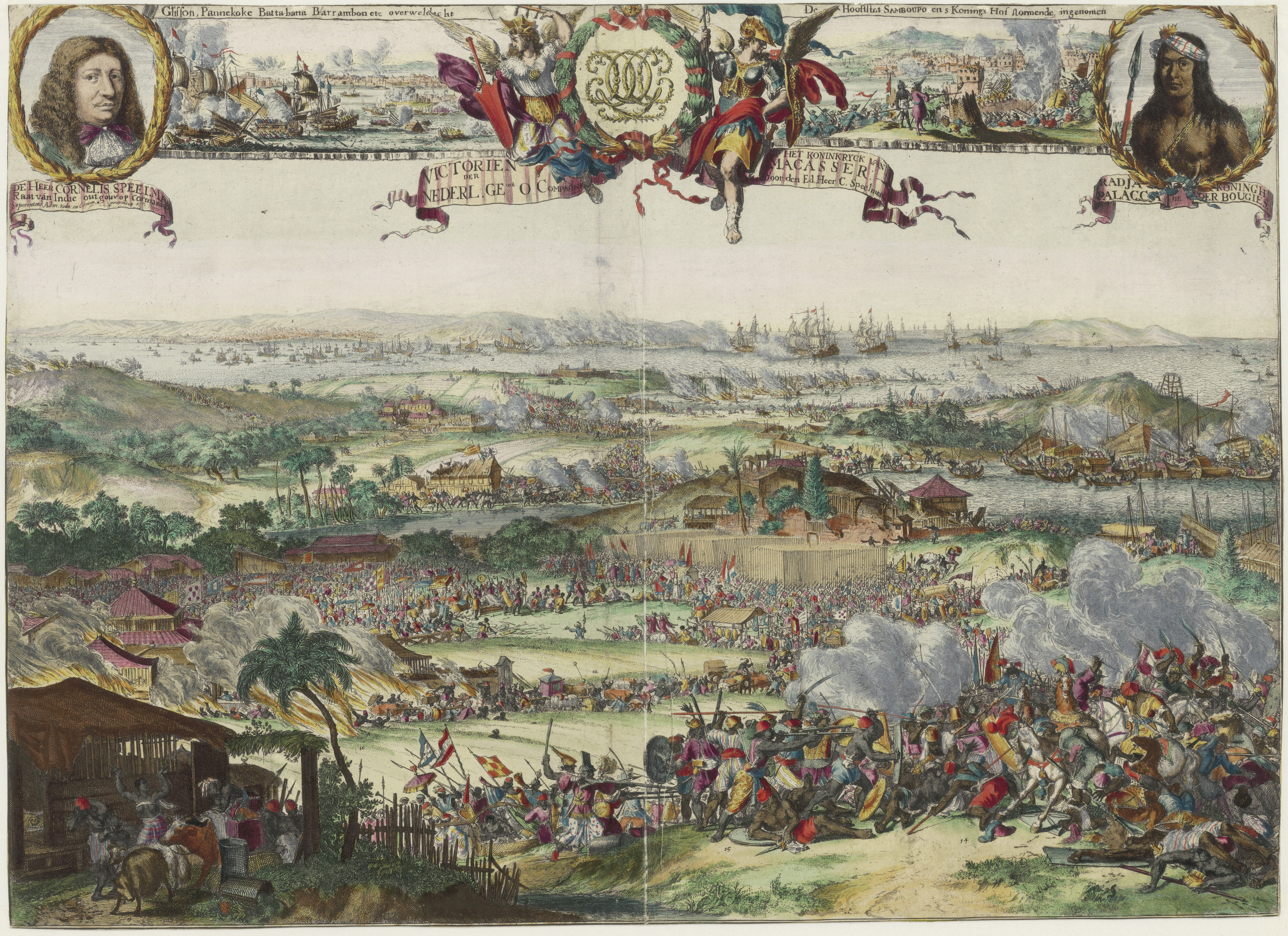
- The conquest of Macassar by Speelman, by Romeyn de Hooghe
| Date | 24 November 1666 – 24 June 1669 (2 years and 7 months) |
| Location | South Sulawesi's South Peninsula |
| Result | Dutch–Buginese victory; Treaty of Bungaya |

Belligerents
| Sultanate of Gowa | Dutch East India Company; Sultanate of Bone; Sultanate of Soppeng; Supported by: Sultanate of Ternate |

Commanders and leaders
| Hasanuddin; Kaicil Kalamata | Cornelis Speelman; Capt. Joncker; Arung Palakka; La Tenribale; Arung Belo Tosa'deng †; Mandarsyah |

Strength
| Unknown | 1,860; 818 Dutch sailors; 578 Dutch soldiers; 395 Native troops of Ambon and Bugis; Several war canoes from Ternate; Later, 1669: 2,000 Bugis (later 7,000–8,000); 572 men (Note: from Ternate, Tidore, Bacan, Butung, and Pampanga (from northern Luzon in the Philippines)); 83 Dutch soldiers; 11 Dutch sailors |

Casualties and losses
- 2,360–4,360 recorded deaths from a disease outbreak. (Note: 360 Dutch (Note: In May 100, June 125, and July 135.) and 2,000–4,000 natives died.) (April–July 1668)

Makassar War (Dutch: Makassar-oorlog), also known as the conquest of Makassar (Dutch: Verovering van Makassar), was a conflict between the Gowa Sultanate and Dutch East India Company supported by its local ally, Sultanate of Bone, lasted from 24 November 1666 to 24 June 1669. The war resulted in Gowa's defeat by the VOC–Bone alliance, emphasized by the signing of the Treaty of Bungaya, which led the maritime empire of the Makassans fell—replaced by Bone as a dominated polity in South Sulawesi.

== Background ==
From 1630 until the early twentieth century, Gowa's political leaders and Islamic functionaries were both recruited from the ranks of the nobility. Since 1607, sultans of Makassar established a policy of welcoming all foreign traders. In 1613, an English factory built in Makassar. This began the hostilities of English-Dutch against Makassar.

In 1644, Bone rose up against Gowa. The Battle of Passempe saw Bone defeated (Note: Andaya (1981) wrongly dates this battle to 1644; the correct timeframe, according to the Makassar Annals, is 18 April–25 May 1646.) and a regent heading an Islamic religious council installed. In 1660 Arung Palakka, the long-haired prince of the Sultanate of Bone, led a Bugis revolt against Gowa, and Palakka became one of its leaders, together with the Gowa-appointed regent of Bone, I Tobala'. By August 1660 the army under Palakka's command grew to 10,000 men. The rebellion was ultimately crushed, and Palakka fled South Sulawesi.

In 1666, under the command of Admiral Cornelis Speelman, the Dutch East India Company (VOC) attempted to bring the small kingdoms in the north under their control, but did not manage to subdue the Sultanate of Gowa. After Hasanuddin ascended to the throne as the 16th sultan of Gowa, he tried to combine the power of the small kingdoms in eastern Indonesia to fight the VOC, which was assisted by the prince of Bone kingdom of Bugis dynasty, Arung Palakka.

== History ==
On the morning of 24 November 1666, the VOC expedition and the Eastern Quarters set sail under the command of Speelman. The fleet consisted of the admiralship Tertholen, and twenty other vessels carrying some 1,860 people, among them 818 Dutch sailors, 578 Dutch soldiers, and 395 native troops from Ambon under Captain Joncker and from Bugis under Arung Palakka and Arung Belo Tosa'deng. Speelman also accepted Sultan Ternate's offer to contribute a number of his war canoes for the war against Gowa. A week after June 19, 1667, Speelman's armada set sail toward Sulawesi and Makassar from Butung. When the fleet reached the Sulawesi coast, Speelman received news of the abortive Bugis uprising in Bone in May and of the disappearance of Arung Palakka during the crossing from the island of Kabaena.

The war later broke in 1666 between the VOC and the sultanate of Gowa and continued until 1669. Palakka's participation was an essential part of the VOC's plan. His arrival prompted the Bugis of Bone and Soppeng to rise in rebellion against Gowa. While the VOC fleet, under Cornelis Speelman, fought the Gowa fleet, Palakka led a "difficult" land campaign in South Sulawesi. The VOC had landed its strengthened troops in a desperate and ultimately weakening Gowa. On 18 November 1667 the Treaty of Bungaya was signed by the major belligerents in a premature attempt to end the war. Feeling aggrieved, Hasanuddin started the war again. Finally, the VOC requested assistance for additional troops from Batavia. Battles broke out again in various places with Sultan Hasanuddin giving fierce resistance.

On 11–12 August 1668, Gowa troops in Makassar came out of their fortifications. Meanwhile they had despatched a sizeable army northward where it was divided with one half proceeding to Maros and the other to Siang. Considering how important Maros was by the Gowa that the elite bodyguard of Sultan Hasanuddin and the Malays were included in this expedition. At the battle of Siang, the Makassarese forces attacked with great fury on 12 August with cannons and smaller guns but were defeated by the Bugis with a loss of 65 men. In Maros the Makassar forces were also forced to retreat by 14 August. Some 5,000 Bugis then marched on to Gowa while another 2,000 remained behind to safeguard their victory in Maros. To encourage similar efforts among their allies, the Dutch praised and rewarded the Bugis leaders involved in the victories.

On 12 October 1668, the VOC-Bugis forces defeated the Gowa forces in a major battle in Makassar. This victory, which Speelman believed could have been a decisive battle if the VOC-Bugis prioritized their advantage, was marred by the death of Arung Belo Tosa'deng in battle. He was the beloved son of La Tenribali and close companion of Arung Palakka. Cornelis Speelman praised his bravery:

"This prince was among the bravest among the Bugis, but reckless, negligent, and undisciplined."

Tosa'deng's death was a severe blow to Bugis morale. On this occasion, even in his death, Tosa'deng had to serve Arung Palakka.

=== Assault of Somba Opu ===
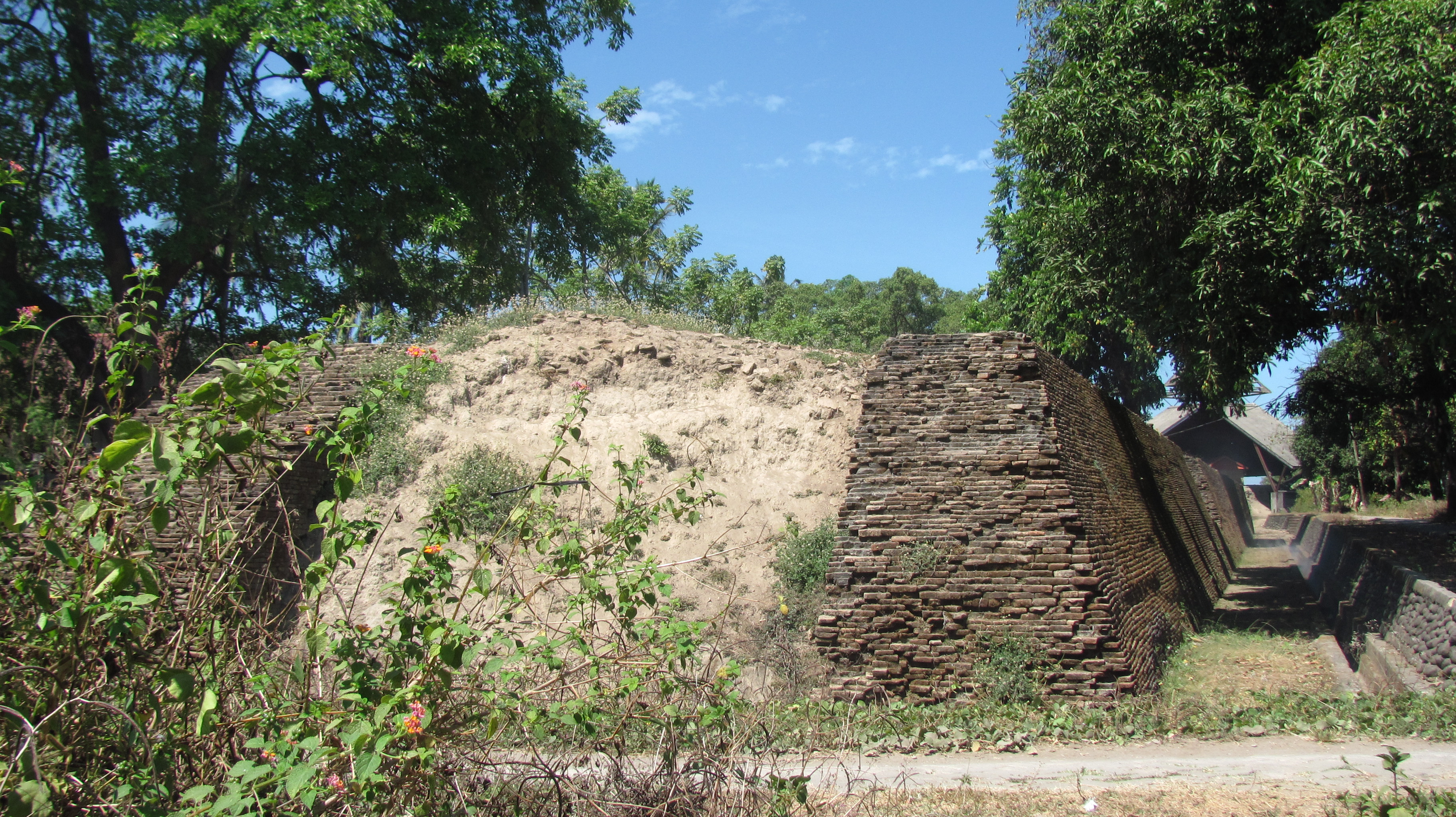
Remnants of the western wall of the Fort Somba Opu.

The assault began with Cornelis Speelman gathering forces which consisted of 2,000 Bugis soldier, plus additional 572 men from Ternate, Tidore, Bacan, Butung, and Pampanga (from northern Luzon in the Philippines), 83 Dutch soldiers and 11 Dutch sailors. Speelman divided the Bugismen into six separate entities, among these were those under the command of Arung Palakka. Arung Palakka and his retinues were commanded to clear the eastern side of Somba Opu from Makassarese defenders, while the others attempt to breach Somba Opu's walls. Three small Dutch ships and a sloop were set along the Garassi (now the Jeneberang) to attack Somba Opu from the south.

Assault of Somba Opu began on 14 June 1669 with the igniting of the explosives placed in a secret tunnel. The blast created an opening about 27.5 meters in the wall of Somba Opu. The fort defenders reacted by sending 25 warriors to block the attackers from breaching in, while others began to erect wooden stakes to close the hole. Speelman decided to ask for the assistance of the soldiers from Batavia. While Speelman gathered his forces, Somba Opu was reinforced with more troops.

Although Speelman was confident that Fort Somba Opu would fall, he stated that nothing like this had ever happened before in Makassar, and he never believed the enemy would put up such a large resistance—Somba Opu proved a strong fort to be defeated. The attackers suffered 50 dead and 68 wounded, among them were several Dutch and native officers. On 22 June, after a 6 days of continuous rain, Arung Palakka decided to lead his Bugis, Bacan and Ambon soldiers to enter the breach in the wall. The attack by Arung Palakka was fierce, forcing the Somba Opu warriors to abandon the breach as the Bugis and their allies breached in. Despite the rain, the Bugis managed to set up a fire to force the Makassar soldiers to retreat from the eastern and western bastions of the citadel. The Makassar soldiers reestablish their defenses at the southern half of Somba Opu. During the retreat, the Makassar soldiers utilized the largest cannon of Somba Opu, the Anak Mangkasar ("Child of Makassar"), which was heaved over the side of the northwestern bastion. As the Dutch-Bugis army advanced from the west, a report came mentioning that the Makassar forces had fled and abandoned Somba Opu. Sultan Hasanuddin of the Makassar force had not wanted to leave but the flames, fanned by a strong northwesterly wind, forced him to leave. The only Makassarese within the fort were Karaeng Karunrung who remained in the palace surrounded by his kris-wielding followers. The people inside the mosque had also been driven out, only the Malay wife of Datu Soppeng, and all her children, plus 80 of her retinue remained.

As soon as Somba Opu fell, 8,000 Bugis began to seize the booty, among the most sought item were porcelain and copperwork. By the time Speelman and Arung Palakka arrived at the Sultan's residence in Somba Opu, everything had already been stripped bare. The Dutch made certain that Somba Opu would never be used again by throwing all the guns found on the ramparts. There were 33 cannons weighing about 46,000 pounds (21,000 kg) and eleven weighing about 24,000 pounds (11,000 kg), 145 small guns, 83 gun chambers, 2 stone-throwers, 60 muskets, 23 arquebuses, 127 barrels of muskets and 8,483 bullets. Bricks of the walls of Somba Opu were reused for Dutch buildings or local population's wells and house foundations. The fort dilapidated further because of its location on the delta of Jeneberang. Build-up of the delta buried remnants of Somba Opu, making it inaccessible from both land and sea.

== Aftermath ==
Following the victory against Gowa, Cornelis Speelman destroyed the large fortress in Somba Opu, and built up Fort Rotterdam (Speelman named this fortress after his birthplace in Netherlands) in its place as the headquarters of VOC activities in Sulawesi. Palakka became the most powerful man in South Sulawesi until his death in 1696. In 1672, he was formally given the title of arung (king) of Bone, and Bone replaced Gowa as the supreme principality in South Sulawesi. He and the VOC arranged a division of power, with Palakka dominating internal affairs and the VOC dominating external affairs.

After the Gowa defeat over the VOC and Bugis, bands of Makassarese soldiers fled Makassar to seek their fortune elsewhere. Initially, they settled in territories of the Banten Sultanate, but in 1674 they were expelled, and turned to piracy, raiding coastal towns in Java and Nusa Tenggara. The Mataram crown prince later allowed them to settle in Demung, a village in the eastern salient of Java. In 1675 an additional band of Makassarese fighters and pirates arrived in Demung led by the Karaeng Galesong. These Makassarese itinerant fighters would later join the rebellion as Trunajaya's allies.

Some of the Makassarese refugees fled across the archipelago and into Jambi and Palembang. This inflow of refugees increased, as Arung Palakka's rule become oppressive and very intrusive in the politics of the local kingdoms. The Jambi royal family had links with southern Sulawesi, as the ruler of Jambi, Anom Ingalaga, had a Makassarese wife, Karaeng Fatimah. His mother was also from Makassar.
