= Fort Somba Opu =

Somba Opu Baruga Somba Opu Samboppe
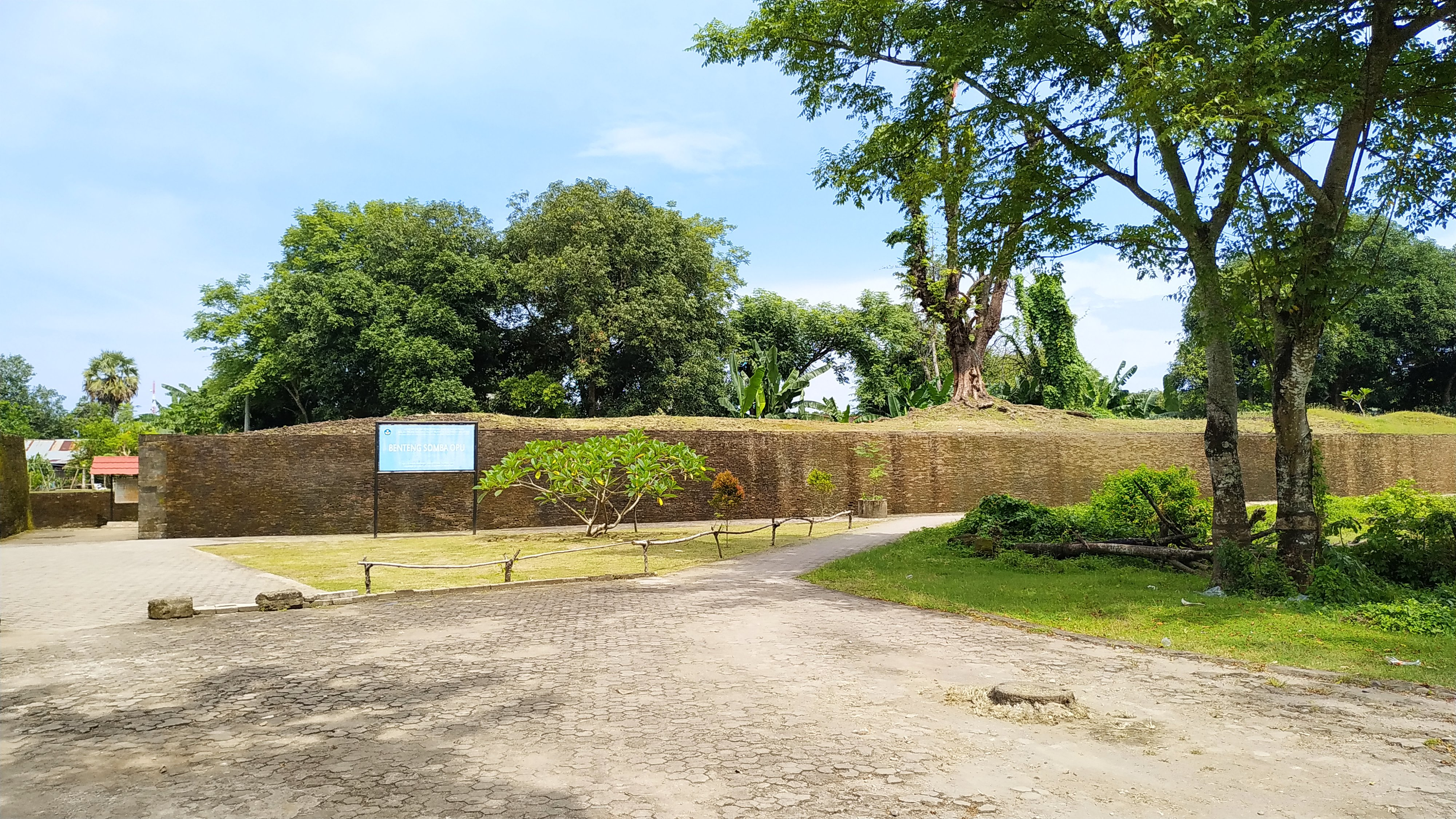
- Fort Somba Opu

- Location within Indonesia
- 5°11′21.65″S 119°24′7.09″E
- Type: Ruins of a former citadel
- Location: Makassar, South Sulawesi

History
- Founded: 16th century
- Original use: Sultanate of Gowa seat

Fort Somba Opu (Makassarese Baruga Somba Opu, Indonesian Benteng Somba Opu) was a fortified commercial center of the Gowa Sultanate. Its ruins are located in Makassar, South Sulawesi, Indonesia. The fort was the center of the Gowa Sultanate in the 16th-century until its destruction by the Dutch East India Company in 1669. The conquest of Somba Opu citadel was one of the most difficult campaigns the Company had ever undertaken in the East.

== History ==
Somba Opu grew on one of the two oldest area in Makassar, the Kale Gowa (Tamalate) and the Tallo'. The Kale Gowa was located on elevated ground on the north bank of the Jeneberang River, around six kilometers from its mouth. Both areas feature walls which encompass a very large area; the perimeter totals about two kilometers. Within the walls were sacred coronation stone on which new rulers (karaeng) took their oaths of office, a sacred spring, and the tombs of the rulers. Many Chinese and Sawankhalok porcelain were discovered around these sites, possibly from the 16th century. For Kale Gowa, the walls were built by King Tumapa'risi' Kallonna (1512–1548)

In the 16th century, the karaeng Tunipalangga (1548–1566) gave permission to the Malay merchants to establish a trading port in the port of Makassar. They were allocated a site at Mangallekana, on the coast just south of Jeneberang river. The area quickly became a trade center, which is confirmed by the title of the Shahbandar (port master) of that period, I Daeng ri Mangallekana. The importance of this Malay fort means that a new capital is required near the trade center. So Tunipalangga instructed the construction of a new fortress to the north bank of Jeneberang river, about a kilometer away from the mouth of the Jeneberang at that time.

Somba Opu became the heart of Makassar during the long duumvirate of Sultan Alauddin of Gowa Kingdom and Karaeng Matoaya of Tallo Kingdom (1590–1637). During their reign, there are another additional brick forts around Makassar: at Tallo', at Panakukkang just south of the Jeneberang mouth, and at Ujung Pandang, which later became the Fort Rotterdam; all of these were built to prepared Makassar against the expected Dutch attack in 1615. Somba Opu was the commercial capital of Makassar, while the old Gowa was a ceremonial center for inaugurations or burials. In the 1630s, kings and nobles established their residence in Somba Opu, staying in a house built on thick pillars. According to Dutch maps drawn on a model from the 1630s, a number of detached houses were located in the rear (east) and northern side of the fort. They were grouped around the royal complex in the southwest side of Somba Opu, which consisted of two enormous wooden palaces, storehouses, and a mosque. Outside Somba Opu fort were two major markets each to the north and south, and houses of the commoners. The quarters of the Portuguese, the Indians, and some European factories were located along the north coast.

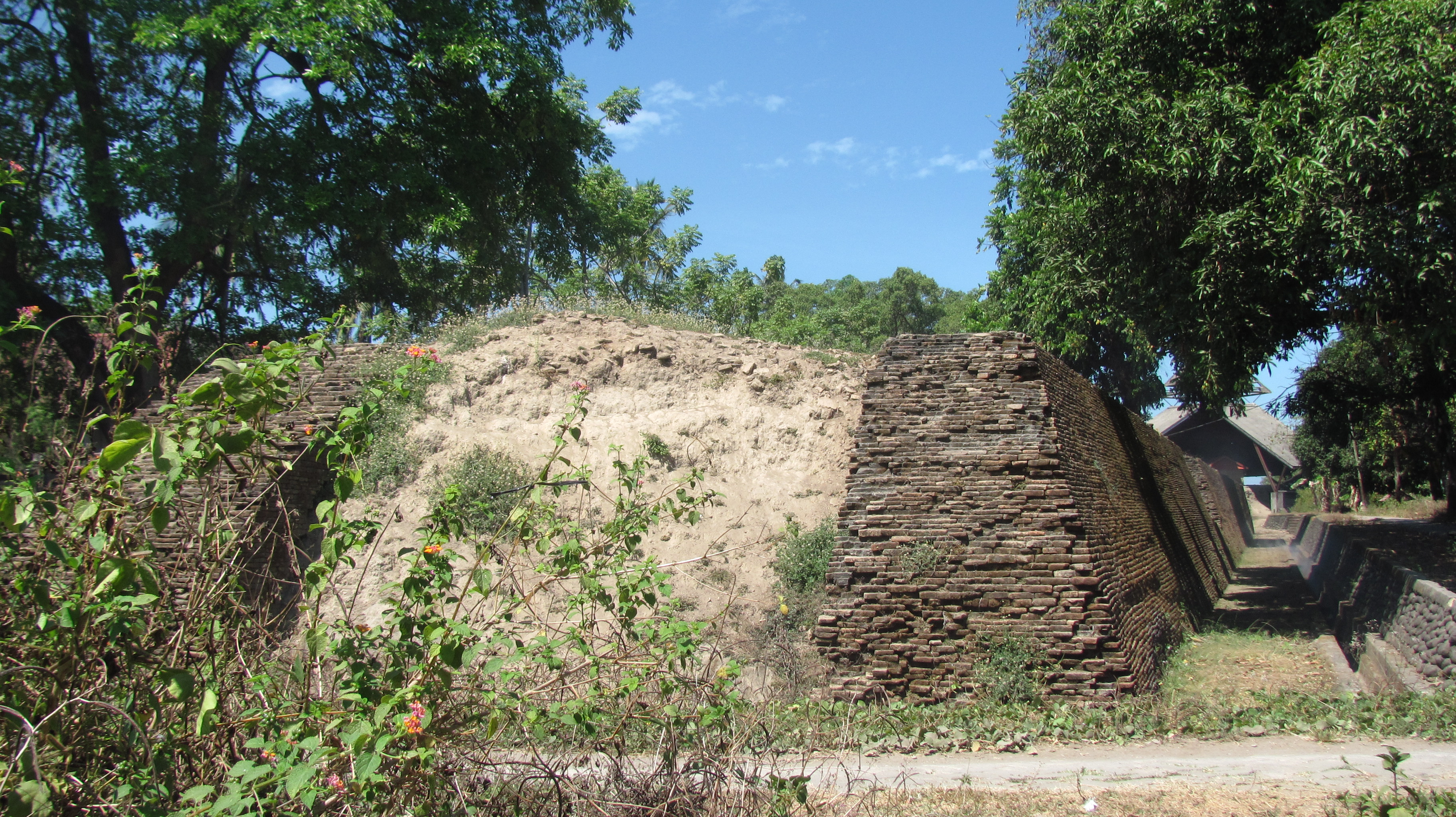
remnants of the western wall.

Destruction of Somba Opu began with the signing of the Bungaya Treaty in 1667 between the Sultanate and the Dutch, and the subsequent war in 1669. Attack of the fort began with Cornelis Speelman, admiral of the VOC, gathering forces which consisted of 2,000 Bugis soldier, the archrival of Gowa, plus additional 572 men from Ternate, Tidore, Bacan, Butung, and Pampanga (from northern Luzon in the Philippines), 83 Dutch soldiers and 11 Dutch sailors. Speelman divided the Bugismen into six separate entities, among these were those under the command of Arung Palakka, a Bugis prince. Arung Palakka and his retinues were commanded to clear the eastern side of Somba Opu from Makassarese defenders, while the others attempt to breach Somba Opu's walls. Three small Dutch ships and a sloop were set along the Garassi (now the Jeneberang) to attack Somba Opu from the south.

Assault of Somba Opu began on 14 June 1669 with the igniting of the explosives placed in a secret tunnel. The blast created an opening about 27.5 meters in the wall of Somba Opu. The fort defenders reacted by sending 25 warriors to block the attackers from breaching in, while others began to erect wooden stakes to close the hole. Speelman decided to ask for the assistance of the soldiers from Batavia. While Speelman gathered his forces, Somba Opu was reinforced with more troops.

Somba Opu proved a strong fort to be defeated. The attackers suffered 50 dead and 68 wounded, among them were several Dutch and native officers. On 22 June, after a 6 days of continuous rain, Arung Palakka decided to lead his Bugis, Bacan and Ambon soldiers to enter the breach in the wall. The attack by Arung Palakka was fierce, forcing the Somba Opu warriors to abandon the breach as the Bugis and their allies breached in. Despite the rain, the Bugis managed to set up a fire to force the Makassar soldiers to retreat from the eastern and western bastions of the citadel. The Makassar soldiers reestablish their defenses at the southern half of Somba Opu. During the retreat, the Makassar soldiers utilized the largest cannon of Somba Opu, the Anak Mangkasar ("Child of Makassar"), which was heaved over the side of the northwestern bastion. As the Dutch-Bugis army advanced from the west, a report came mentioning that the Makassar forces had fled and abandoned Somba Opu. Sultan Hasanuddin of the Makassar force had not wanted to leave but the flames, fanned by a strong northwesterly wind, forced him to leave. The only Makassarese within the fort were Karaeng Karunrung who remained in the palace surrounded by his kris-wielding followers. The people inside the mosque had also been driven out, only the Malay wife of Datu Soppeng, and all her children, plus 80 of her retinue remained.

As soon as Somba Opu fell, 8,000 Bugis began to seize the booty, among the most sought item were porcelain and copperwork. By the time Speelman and Arung Palakka arrived at the Sultan's residence in Somba Opu, everything had already been stripped bare. The Dutch made certain that Somba Opu would never be used again by throwing all the guns found on the ramparts. There were 33 cannons weighing about 46,000 pounds (21,000 kg) and eleven weighing about 24,000 pounds (11,000 kg), 145 small guns, 83 gun chambers, 2 stone-throwers, 60 muskets, 23 arquebuses, 127 barrels of muskets and 8,483 bullets. Bricks of the walls of Somba Opu were reused for Dutch buildings or local population's wells and house foundations. The fort dilapidated further because of its location on the delta of Jeneberang. Build-up of the delta buried remnants of Somba Opu, making it inaccessible from both land and sea.

Somba Opu was rediscovered in the 1980s, on the island formed by two major mouths of the present Jeneberang river. The fort was reconstructed in 1990. A 9-meter cannon has been discovered in the fort, as well as other artifacts which were collected within a nearby site museum.

The fort is somewhat forgotten. It is strange that very little attention has been paid by either the Dutch or the Indonesians to the strongest fort ever built by Indonesians, as well as the scene of one of the fiercest battles they ever had to fight.

== The Fort then and now ==
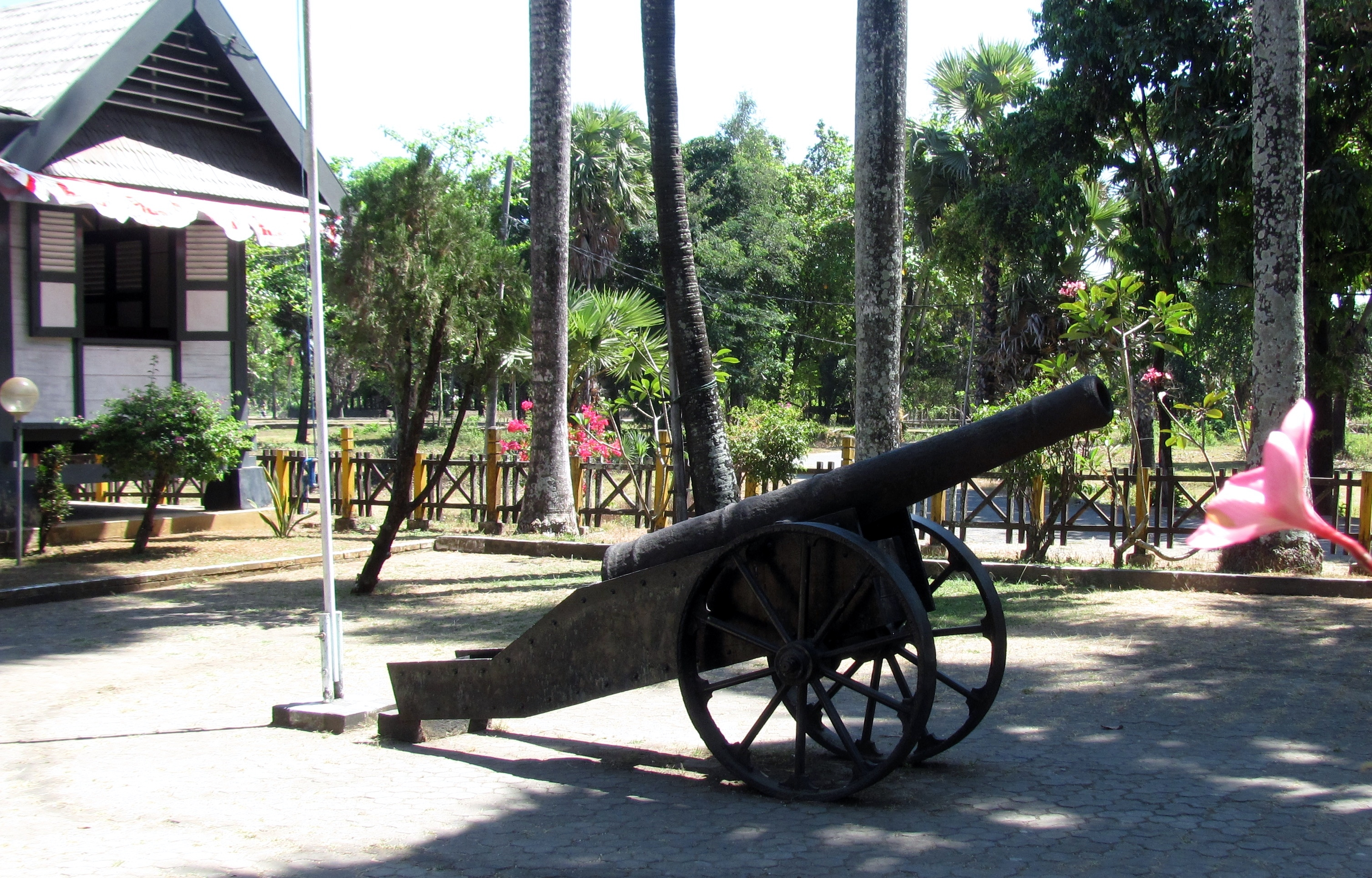
A cannon in Somba Opu.

The fort is located in Kampung Sarombe, on the island formed by two major mouths of the present Jeneberang river. Originally it was a rectangular shaped fort about 240 x 500 meters with bastions on each corner. Currently the southern section (150 meter) of the western wall is the most visible, two-thirds of the original western wall. It is a red brick wall of 3.5 meter thick. Part of the reason why this part survived further damage is because a holy tomb located on the southwest bastion. This bastion is now a mound of 6.5 meters high and 13 meters in diameter. It is known as Maccini' Sombala' (Makassarese "the sighting of sails") or Tompo' Bataya (Makassarese "the highest brick-formation"). Maccini' Sombala' was originally the name of the royal palace within Somba Opu, which was built on August 26, 1650, to replace an earlier palace; the name lingered into the bastion centuries later. Another wall extend to the east of the bastion for about 500 meter, broken by flooding at many places. The rear eastern wall can also be traced, though it strangely curves. The once very strong 500-meter-long northern wall is the most difficult to trace. This wall might be washed by a small stream that formed in the past during the development of the delta and washed away the northern part of the ruined fort, as well as its ruined northeast bastion.

The area around the fort is planned a recreation park area containing several remnants of the Gowa Kingdom as well as museums and South Sulawesi traditional house. The Gowa Discovery Amusement Park was established to the east end of the park. There is a concern that the heritage of the fort will be clumsily destroyed with the new development.

== See also ==
- Fort Rotterdam
