= Battle of Passempe =

17th-century battle in Sulawesi

Second Battle of Passempe
Date	18 April–25 May 1646 (1 month and 1 week)
Location	Pasempe, South Sulawesi
Result	Gowa–allied victory
Territorial changes	Wajoq recapture Timurung, Amali, Mampu, Sailong, Bunne, and Pammana

Belligerents
Sultanate of Gowa; Sultanate of Wajo; Sultanate of Luwu; Kingdom of Soppeng	Sultanate of Boné; Pro-Boné Soppeng

Commanders and leaders
Malikussaid; Karaeng Cenrana	La Tenriaji (POW); Arung Kung (POW); Daeng Pabila (POW); Arung Palakka (POW)

Battle of Passempe of 1646 (Makasar: Bundu’ka ri Passempe’), also called as Passempaka War or Pasompak War, was a military conflict in present-day Pasempe, which is situated approximately 10 kilometres west of Watampone. It was fought between the Gowa Sultanate and its allies led by Karaeng Cenrana as the head of the expedition, and rebellious vassal of Boné led by La Tenriaji. The event took place from 18 April to 25 May 1646, resulted in Gowa's victory against Boné and its degradation from vassal to colony.

== Background ==
In 1611, Boné was invaded by the Sultanate of Gowa in a war, and pressured to convert to Islam. Boné State later enjoyed a period of prosperity in the middle of the 17th century.

During the reign of King La Maddaremmeng, who ruled from 1626 to 1643, he enforced stricter Islamic teachings in Boné, without considering the contextual adaptation of the kingdom's environment at that time. He issued a policy not to employ slaves (ata), because he considered that all Muslims were free people — all slaves must be freed or given wages for their hard work, except for slaves who were inherited.

But there was opposition from the nobles led by his own mother, Datu Pattiro. However, Maddaremmeng still wanted to enforce the policy and spread his Islamic teachings by force to neighboring areas of Boné such as Wajo, Soppeng, Sawitto, Massepe, and Bacukiki. Boné's neighbors interpreted this movement in terms of political rivalry. Boné nobles and Maddaremmeng's mother asked for help to Malikussaid to fought against Maddaremmeng.

=== First Battle of Passempe ===
Malikussaid, the ruler of Gowa, quickly responded to the events by sending his envoy who brought a letter for Maddaremmeng, but he did not reply to the letter. Malikussaid was furious, he prepared to go to war against Boné. The first battle of Passempe took place on 8 October 1643, (Note: Makassar Annals interpreted the war/battle as Pare-Pare War: "nabattu karaenga nabetana Boné ri bunduq ri Pare-parea [...]" (the Karaeng arrived after conquering Boné in the Pare-Pare war [...])) Boné was defeated by Gowa which was assisted by Wajo and Soppeng troops, and more than 30,000 Bugis were taken prisoner. Maddaremmeng and his brother La Tenriaji fled to Larompong in southern Luwu but Tenriaji managed to secretly return to Boné. After Maddaremmeng was finally defeated and forcibly brought to Gowa, (Note: According to Fatma and Palloge, Maddaremmeng was defeated in the battle of Cimpu.) Boné became the vassal of Gowa. On November 1643, they replaced the deposed Boné ruler with a Boné noble appointed by the Makassar, I Tobala, but the people of Boné appointed Maddaremmeng's younger brother, La Tenriaji as the new ruler of Boné without the knowledge of the ruler of Gowa.

== Battle ==
After La Tenriaji appointed as the new ruler of Boné by the people of Boné, he raised an army to go to revolt against Gowa. Upon hearing the news of the development, Malikussaid launched an expedition against Boné to crush a resistance led by Tenriaji. Tenriaji's movement was supported by La Tenritatta family of Soppeng, Arung Palakka's family. Malikussaid began to assemble his troops again, called upon La Makkarakka (ruler of Wajo), La Basso (Luwu), and We Addang (Soppeng) to participate, and appointed Karaeng Cenrana as the head of the expedition. After learning that the Gowa-led troops were on their way to enter Boné, Tenriaji mobilized his troops to Passempe, a hilly area not far from Watampone and very ideal to be used as a defense base. Finally, a fierce battle took place in Passempe which was written in Lontara Bilang as Bundu’ka ri Passempe’ (Battle in Passempe). But once again, Boné was defeated by Gowa which was assisted by Wajo, Luwu, and Soppeng forces. La Tenriaji became a prisoner of war including Arung Kung and Daeng Pabila. Members of the La Tenritatta including Arung Palakka were either taken hostage or became the prisoner of war; and made servants in the palace of Karaeng Pattingalloang.

== Aftermath ==
After the defeat of Boné rebel forces led by La Tenriaji in Pasempe, Boné's status was further degraded to that of a "slave" (i. e. colony) by Gowa. (Note: "Now will be related the defeat of Passempe in 1644, (Note: Andaya (1981) wrongly dates this battle to 1644.) the complete smashing of the insence-holder, the total enslavement of the land of Boné by Goa.") To prevent rebellion, all the Boné nobles were exiled to Gowa. Since 1644, when Boné was still a Gowa's vassal, Jennang (supervisor) was placed who then appeared again in 1646, whose duty was to supervise Boné so that there would be no more disturbing resistance. If there were nobles who dared to oppose, they would be taken to Makassar to be forced to work on the construction of the forts. After the victory of the Gowa-led forces, ruler of Wajo, Luwu, and Soppeng gathering in Baruga Baliya to reaffirm the Treaty of Topaceddo, which is called Singkerru Patolae in Bugis. In that treaty, Wajo recaptures areas from Boné which it considered its own, such as Timurung, Amali, Mampu, Sailong, Bunne, and Pammana. Rather than following the custom of retaining conquered rulers or members of local royal families as vassal, Gowa chose to appoint a kali (regent), a move that sparked discontent and eventually culminated in dramatic events two decades later.

== Sources ==
- Ali, Muhammad (1980). Bone Selayang Pandang. Watampone: Nas Media Pustaka.
- Anawagis, Fian (2023). "Arus Balik Kekuasaan di Sulawesi Selatan Abad ke-17". JAWI (in Indonesian). 6 (2): 99. doi:10.24042/00202361865000.
- Andaya, Leonard Y. (1981). The Heritage of Arung Palakka: A History of South Sulawesi (Celebes) in the Seventeenth Century. The Hague: Martinus Nijhoff. doi:10.1163/9789004287228. ISBN 9789004287228.
- Cummings, William P., ed. (2010). The Makassar Annals. Bibliotheca Indonesia. Vol. 35. Translated by William Cummings. Leiden: KITLV Press. ISBN 9789067183666.
- Darmawijaya, D. (2017). "Penjelasan Sejarah Atas Keluarnya Arung Palakka Dari Barisan Sultan Hasanuddin Menjelang Perang Makassar". Walasuji Jurnal Sejarah Dan Budaya (in Indonesian). 8 (1): 27–43. doi:10.36869/wjsb.v8i1.103.
- Fatma, F (2020). "Perbudakan di Kerajaan Bone Pada Masa Pemerintahan Raja la Maddaremmeng: 1631-1644". Journal Idea of History (in Indonesian). 3 (2): 44–56. doi:10.33772/history.v3i2.1123.
- Macknight, Charles Campbell; Paeni, Mukhlis; Hadrawi, Muhlis, eds. (2020). The Bugis Chronicle of Bone. Translated by Campbell Macknight; Mukhlis Paeni; Muhlis Hadrawi. Canberra: Australian National University Press. doi:10.22459/BCB.2020. ISBN 9781760463588. S2CID 218816844.
- Palloge, Andi (2006). Sejarah Kerajaan Tanah Bone (in Indonesian). Gowa: Yayasan Al-Muallim. ISBN 9789791571203.
- Pamelleri, Andi (22 April 2006). "Riwayat Kabupaten Bone" [A Short History of Bone Regency] (PDF) (in Indonesian). Archived from the original (PDF) on 30 August 2019.
- Patunru, Abdurrazak D. (1989). Sejarah Bone (in Indonesian). Ujung Pandang: Yayasan Kebudayaan Sulawesi Selatan.
- Pelras, Christian (1996). The Bugis. Oxford: Blackwell Publishers. ISBN 9780631172314.
