= Ongwatko =

Chinese merchant

- 王悅

Kapitan Cina of Makassar
- In office 1679–1701
- Preceded by: Oeikoeko
- Succeeded by: Ongkiego

Ongwatko (Note: Also referred to as Ong Goat Ko, I Wakko, or Wang Yue.) (Chinese: 王悅; fl. 1679–1701) was a Chinese merchant active in Makassar during the late seventeenth century, serving as the city's second Kapitan Cina (Captain of the Chinese). He traded in slaves, maritime products and bird's nest across Eastern Indonesia and the Philippines.

== Early life ==
Ongwatko was the son of Makassar's first Kapitan Cina, Oeikoeko (or Intje Couko). Oeikoeko was a Muslim Chinese who owned an arrack brewery with monopoly rights from the Dutch East India Company, and when Oeikoeko moved to Batavia in 1679 Ongwatko took over the refinery. They were part of Makassar's then-small Chinese community, which numbered just nineteen people shortly after the Makassar War in 1669.

== Mercantile career ==
Ongwatko's mercantile activities centered around Sulawesi, the Maluku Islands, and he also traded to Timor, Mindanao, and Sulu. His tenure as Kapitan Cina coincided with the opening of maritime trade in Qing China, resulting in a boom in Chinese trading activities in Southeast Asia. He was one of the most prominent traders in Makassar during his time, and held a virtual monopoly on the trade of tortoiseshell and edible bird's nest (exports to China), obtaining his supplies from local communities through giving advance payments. He also traded in slaves, and pioneered the trade in sea cucumbers, entering a contract with the king of Buton where Ongwatko paid a fee to the king to allow the collection of sea cucumbers on the island. On one occasion, a trading ship belonging to Ongwatko was looted by pirates, and its cargo manifest included textiles, metal tools, rice, Japanese axes, and Siamese ceramics.

In the local political scene, Ongwatko maintained a good relationship with Arung Palakka, the king of Bone, and was recorded to attend his funeral in 1696. Ongwatko also helped resolve a dispute between Chinese, Wajo, and Malay merchants in 1698, and funded the construction of a Chinese temple in Makassar (today the Ibu Agung Bahari Vihāra) in 1685. Aside from leading the Chinese community, Ongwatko was also responsible for Makassar's Malay community, which did not appoint their own Kapitan until 1706. He would be succeeded by his son Ongkiego as Kapitan Cina in 1701, and Ongwatko's grandsons Ongkingsai and Li Ruzhang would continue to hold the office until 1748 or 1749.
