= Arung Palakka =

Bugis warrior-prince who fought with the VOC and became King of Bone

La Tenritatta Arung Palakka
- Daéng Sérang; Malampé-é Gemme’na
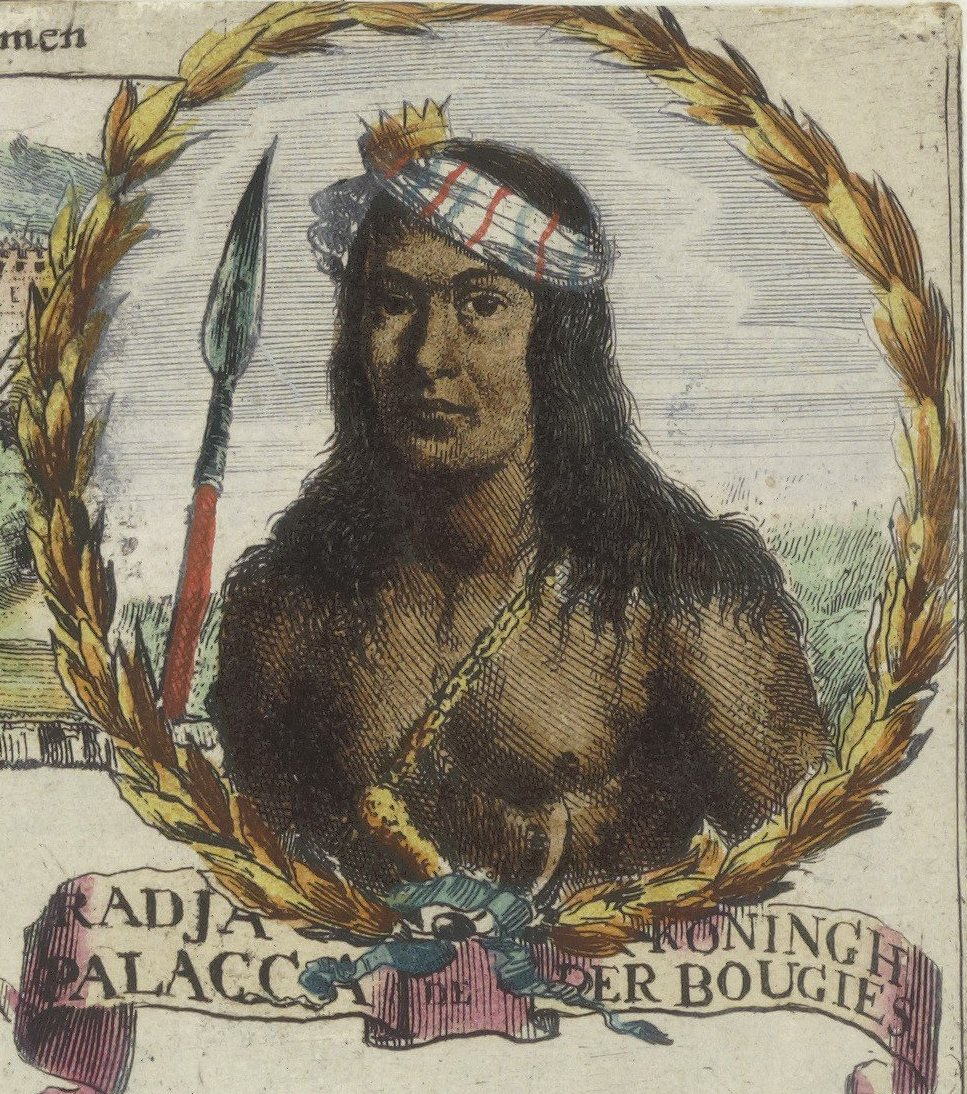
- Potrait by Romeyn de Hooghe

15th King of Bone
- Reign: 1672–1696
- Coronation: 3 November 1672
- Predecessor: La Tenriaji
- Successor: La Patau Matanna Tikka
- Born: September 15, 1634; Lamatta, Mario Riwawo, Soppeng, Bone State
- Died: 6 April 1696 (aged 61); Bontoala, Oedjoeng Pandang, Dutch East Indies
- Spouses: Sira Daéng Talélé Karaéng Ballajawa (m. 1668; div. 1671) Wé Tan-ri Pau Adda Sange Datu-ri Watu (m. 1673) Daéng Marannu (m. 1684)
- Father: La Pottobuné' (Arung Tana Tengnga)
- Mother: Wé Tenri Suwi

Sultan Saaduddin Arung Palakka, or La Tenritatta to Unru' (1634 or 1635 – 1696) was a 17th-century Bugis prince and warrior. He supported the Dutch East India Company (VOC) in the Makassar War (1666–1669) against the Gowa Sultanate in his native South Sulawesi (today part of Indonesia). After the defeat of Gowa, he became the King of Bone and South Sulawesi's most powerful man.

== Biography ==
Arung Palakka was born in 1634 or 1635 in the village of Tettikengrarae, Mario-ri Wawo, Soppeng. His father was La Pottobune Arung Tana Tenga, a minor lord in Soppeng, and his mother was Datu Mario-ri Wawo We Tenrisui, granddaughter of the first Muslim ruler of Bone. Soppeng and Bone were autonomous principalities in South Sulawesi under the hegemony of the Gowa Sultanate. As a child he was known as La Tenritatta, "He who cannot be struck". In the 1646 Battle of Passempe, Bone was defeated by the Gowa Sultanate (Note: Andaya (1981) wrongly dates this battle to 1644; the correct timeframe, according to the Makassar Annals, is 18 April–25 May 1646.) and his family became hostages living in Gowa. The family served under the Chief Minister (Tuma'bicarra butta) of Gowa, Karaeng Pattingalloang, who liked Arung Palakka and gave him a proper upbringing as a prince.

=== Rise to power and reign ===
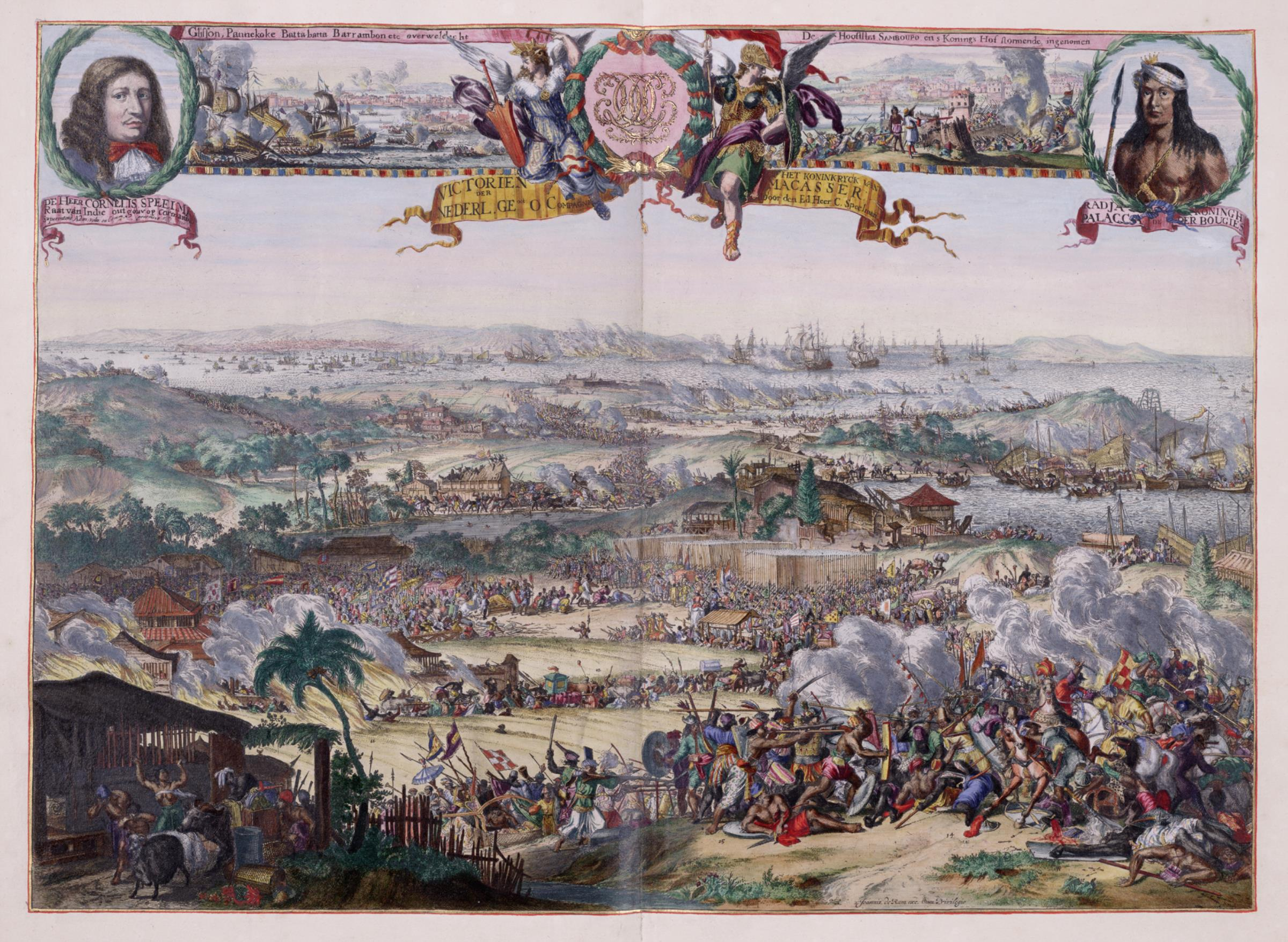
The Makassar War (1666–1669), which saw Palakka's rise to power in South Sulawesi.

In 1660 Bone rose in rebellion against Gowa, and Palakka became one of its leaders, together with the Gowa-appointed regent of Bone, Tobala'. By August 1660 the army under Palakka's command grew to 10,000 men. The rebellion was ultimately crushed, and Palakka fled South Sulawesi. In 1663 he settled in Batavia, which was under control of the Dutch East India Company (VOC). Subsequently, he allied himself with the VOC in the Makassar War against Sultan Hasanuddin of Gowa. Palakka's participation was an essential part of the VOC's plan. His arrival prompted the Bugis of Bone and Soppeng to rise in rebellion against Gowa. While the VOC fleet, under Cornelis Speelman, fought the Gowa fleet, Palakka led a "difficult" land campaign in South Sulawesi. The war ended in the victory of the VOC and Palakka's Bugis forces.

Following the victory against Gowa, Palakka became the most powerful man in South Sulawesi until his death in 1696. In 1672 he was formally given the title of arung (king) of Bone, and Bone replaced Gowa as the supreme principality in South Sulawesi. He and the VOC arranged a division of power, with Palakka dominating internal affairs and the VOC dominating external affairs. During his reign, he ignored the pre-existing consultative system of government and instead governed with authoritarian rule supported by warriors loyal to him. He led a series of campaigns to ensure his domination in South Sulawesi. His value as a military ally and his personal ties with Speelman (later VOC Governor-General) ensured continued support from the VOC.

=== Trunajaya campaign ===
The defeat of Gowa and the subsequent Palakka–VOC rule prompted an outflow of people from South Sulawesi. Notably, some of these refugees settled in Java and joined forces with the Madurese prince Trunajaya in the Trunajaya rebellion against the Mataram Sultanate. The rebellion almost caused Mataram's collapse until the VOC intervened on behalf of Mataram. Palakka aided his VOC allies and led a Bugis army in suppressing the rebellion.

== Death and legacy ==
Arung Palakka died at Bontoala on 6 April 1696 and was buried at the Gowa-Talloq royal cemetery near the Katangka Mosque as he had requested. Bells at Fort Rotterdam rang for two hours and salvos were fired during the interring. His nephew La Patau was immediately declared as his successor by custom, despite an order requiring VOC approval for a ruler to be declared.

Indonesians today, especially those from Makassar, view the Makassar War and Palakka's role in it with bitterness. Palakka is seen as a traitor who allied himself with the colonialist VOC to conquer the Gowa Sultanate, his fellow Indonesians, and a truly Indonesian polity.
