= Alauddin I of Gowa =

Indonesian sultan (1586 –1639)

Alauddin I
- I Mangnga'rangi Daeng Manrabbia Sultan Alauddin Tuminanga ri Gaukanna Tumenanga ri Gaukanna
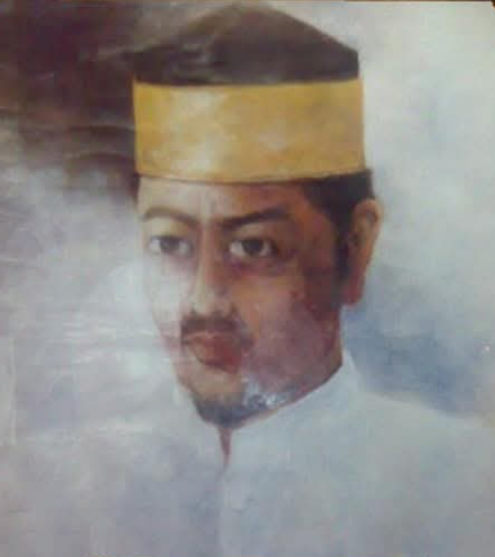

Sultan of Gowa
- Reign: 1593 – 15 June 1639
- Predecessor: Tunipasulu
- Successor: Sultan Malikussaid
- Born: I Mangngarangi; 1586; Gowa, South Sulawesi
- Died: 15 June 1639 (aged 52–53); Somba Opu, Gowa
- Cause of death: Heart Attack
- Spouse: I Laja Daeng Mappasan; I Mainung Daeng
- Issue: I Manuntungi Sultan Malikussaid
- Father: Tunijalloq

Alauddin I (born I Mangngarangi; 1586 – June 15 1639) was the fourteenth ruler of Gowa and became the first Sultan of the Sultanate of Gowa. He is recognized as first ruler of Gowa to embrace Islam. During his reign, he carried out a large-scale expansion. This massive expansion was largely driven by the spread of Islam and the Sultanate's commercial ambitions, as they aimed to dominate the trade routes and surrounding territories in Sulawesi.

== Early life ==
Alauddin, whose birth name was I Mangngarangi, was born in 1586. He was the son of the 12th King of Gowa, I Manggorai Daeng Mammeta Karaeng Bontolangkasa (or Tunijalloq), who ruled from 1565 to 1590. He was also the grandson of Tuma'parisi Kallonna (1510–1546), the ninth King of Gowa, who had previously strengthened the Kingdom of Gowa's standing in the Nusantara region.

I Mangngarangi was appointed king in 1593 at the age of seven, following the end of his older brother's, Tunipasuluq's rule. He was installed by the Tummabicara Butta Makassar, Karaeng Matoaya. The Tumabicara Butta was the second highest office in the bureaucratic structure of the Gowa-Tallo Kingdom alliance acting as a Chief Minister.

By the age of nine years old he was introduced to Islam by an Islamic preacher from Minangkabau named Datuk ri Bandang, from Koto Tangah. Datuk ri Bandang converted I Mangngarangi to Islam on September 22, 1605. After converting to Islam, I Mangerangi adopted the title Alauddin, which translates to 'Above Religion' (or 'Sublimity of the Faith'). During this period, the Gowa-Tallo Kingdom was renamed to the Sultanate of Gowa.

== Reign ==
During the reign of Sultan Alauddin, the Sultanate experienced significant positive development, which can be substantiated by the various achievements he accomplished. One of his most monumental contributions to the people of Makassar, which continues to endure today, was the adoption of Islam as the official state religion, a transition that subsequently extended throughout the populace.
