= Hasanuddin of Gowa =

Sultan of Gowa from 1653 to 1669

Hasanuddin
- Muhammad Bakir I Mallombasi Daeng Mattawang Karaeng Bonto Mangape
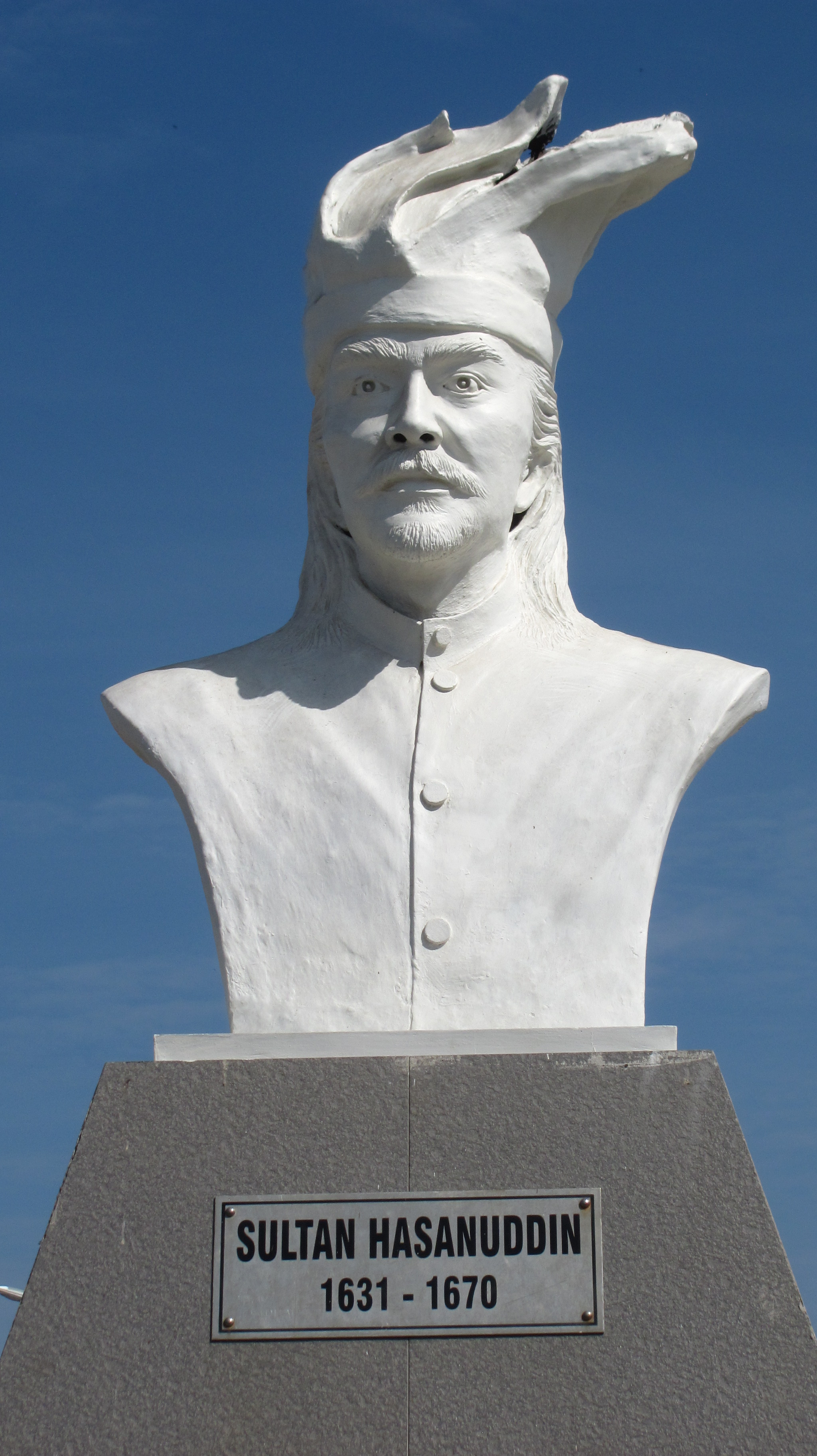
- A bust of Sultan Hasanuddin at Losari beach, Makassar

16th Sultan of Gowa
- Reign: 1653 - 1669
- Predecessor: Malikussaid I of Gowa
- Successor: Amir Hamzah of Gowa
- Born: 12 Januari 1631; Gowa, Sultanate of Gowa
- Died: 12 June 1670 (aged 39); Gowa, Dutch East Indies
- Issue: Sultan Amir Hamzah, Sultan Muhammad Ali, Sultan Abdul Jalil, Karaeng Galesong
Regnal name
- I Mallombasi Daeng Mattawang Muhammad Baqir Karaeng Bonto Mangngape Sultan Hasanuddin Tuminanga ri Balla Pangkana
- Father: Sultan Malikussaid
- Mother: I Sabbe Lokmo Daeng Takontu

Sultan Hasanuddin (Sultan Hasanuddin Tumenanga Ri Balla Pangkana; 12 January 1631 – 12 June 1670) was the 16th Ruler of The Sultanate of Gowa as Sombaya Ri Gowa XVI from 1653 to 1669. He was proclaimed as Indonesian National Hero on 6 November 1973. The Dutch called Sultan Hasanuddin "the Rooster of the East" as he was described as aggressive in battle.

== Early life ==
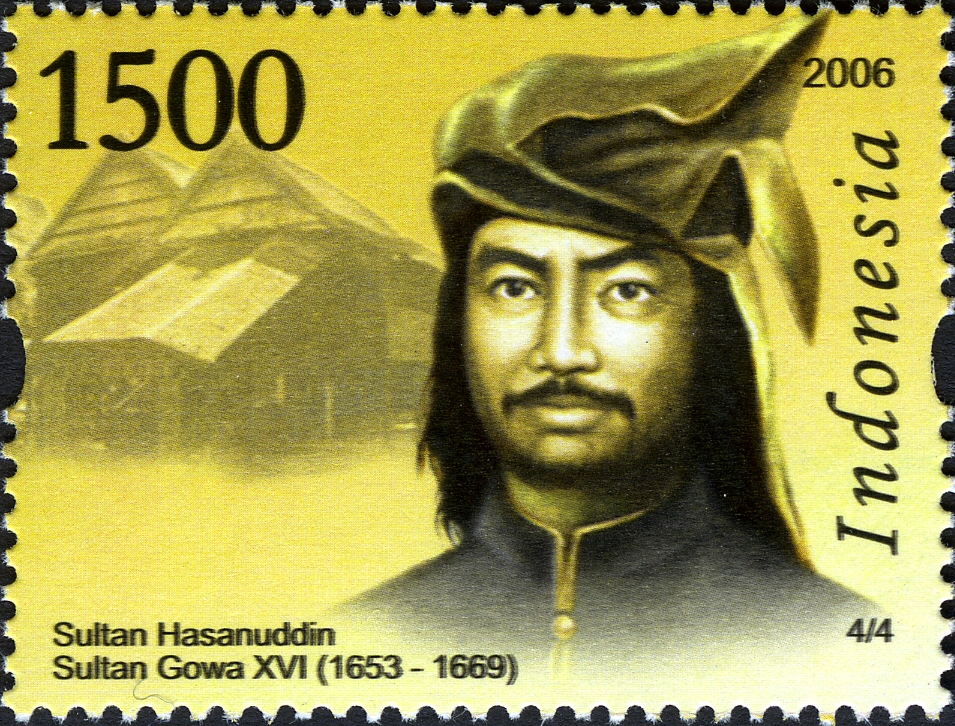
This stamp features Sultan Hasanuddin in a village in a yellow background

Sultan Hasanuddin was born in Makassar, Gowa Kingdom (on what is now part of South Sulawesi) under the name I Mallombasi Daeng Mattawang Muhammad Baqir Karaengta Bonto Mangape Sultan Hasanuddin, as the name of the giving of Qadi Islam Sultanate of Gowa namely Sayyid Syaikh Jalaludin bin Ahmad Bafaqih Al-Aidid, a mursyid of Baharunnur Baalwy in South Sulawesi as well as teacher tarekat of Sheikh Yusuf and Sultan Hasanuddin. He was the second prince of the 15th King of Gowa, Sultan Malikussaid who died on 15 November 1653.

Upon ascension to the throne, Hasanuddin changed his name to Sultan Muhammad Hasanuddin Sultan Hasanuddin Tuminanga ri Balla'pangkana.

== Succession, war and rebellion ==
"......Makassar, after all, was a powerful kingdom, full of combative folk, which, because of its unbreakable power and strong fortresses, despised our nation as a kind of Goliath. They mocked the peace they had made with us and caused trouble to our people on and around Ambon. They regularly attacked us there, as a result of which many of our people had died. The Makassarese even inspired great fear among their mighty neighbors, and many kingdoms, islands and fortifications stood under their control. The kingdom of Makassar itself is equipped with strong castles and many fortresses to repel possible enemies."

— VOC employee Dirk Schouten, 1657

After his accession to the throne of Gowa, Hasanuddin faced a turbulent situation as the Dutch East Indies Company (abbreviated as VOC) colonized large parts of the East Indies. During this period, the Kingdom of Gowa was the sole large east Indonesian kingdom which was not yet colonized by the Dutch.

The conflict between the Makassar and the VOC had started as early as 1616, when 15 Dutch sailors were massacred after the company had taken a number of Makassarese nobles hostage in order to force the Makassarese king into honoring his debts to them. War would ebb and flow between the two powers for over fifty years, as the Dutch were bent on having a complete monopoly of the spice trade, from which Gowa also derived its prosperity. With that goal in mind it was practically impossible for either side to obtain a workable permanent compromise, as the VOC would not tolerate any commercial (and by extension, military) rival in the region.

In order to resist Dutch encroachments, Hasanuddin made every effort to strengthen his military forces. Already Makassar was a cosmopolitan society with a large population of Europeans, of which the Portuguese were the most numerous, numbering nearly 2,000. The large numbers of European experts available allowed Makassar to greatly modernize their army and navy; for example by 1632 the Makassarese ordnance was managed by an Englishmen who had converted into Islam. The capital city was protected by the fortress of Sombaopu, built in the trace Italienne style in the 1630s, within which was also housed the royal palace.

The first conflict between Hasanudin and the Dutch were fought over the company's spice monopoly in Ambon; this escalated into a blockade of the harbor of Makassar by the VOC fleet between 1654–1655. As the war was costly and disrupted the spice trade both sides came into an agreement, signing a treaty on 2 February 1656. However, as the treaty specified that neither sides should intrude into the others' alliances and diplomacy, it would stand in the way of the Dutch agenda to monopolize the spice trade, meaning that further conflict was inevitable. Also, Hasannudin wasn't happy that the treaty forbade him from sending trading fleets to the Moluccas without the company's permission.

Finally, on 27 April 1659, Hasannudin demanded that the company stopped its attacks on Seram, Buru and Amblau, all of which were vassal states of Makassar, evacuated Menado, and admit that its monopoly of the spice trade in the Moluccas "were in contravention of God's laws". This resulted in the VOC breaking off negotiations and preparing for war instead.

A fleet of thirty one ships, manned by a thousand sailors and carrying 1,200 European soldiers and 400 Ambonese mercenaries were gathered in Ambon under the command of Johan van Dam for the VOC war effort. Aware that this force was not enough to capture the city of Makassar itself, the Hoge Regering of Batavia decided to aim for a better bargaining position instead, using subterfuge rather than force. Eleven of the best armed Dutch ships sailed up the coast of Makassar, taking under fire the various fortifications to create an impression of a much larger force. Finally it bombarded Sombaopu with great violence, causing most of the garrison of the southern fortress of Panakkukkang to rush away to help defend it. However, Panakkukkang was the Dutch's actual target, and the remainder of the Dutch fleet, having remained out of sight, swooped down and captured the weakened fortress instead. A Makassarese attempt to recapture the fort were repulsed with great loss, and the Company were able to force Hasannudin back into the negotiating table. A new treaty specified that Makassar would no longer interfere with the Company's business in Menado, Buton and Ambon, that Makassar was prohibited from sailing on Banda and Ambon, that it would pay an enormous war indemnity which would cover the cost of the entire operation, and, worst of all, that all Portuguese should leave Makassar, and the Company would have open trade there.

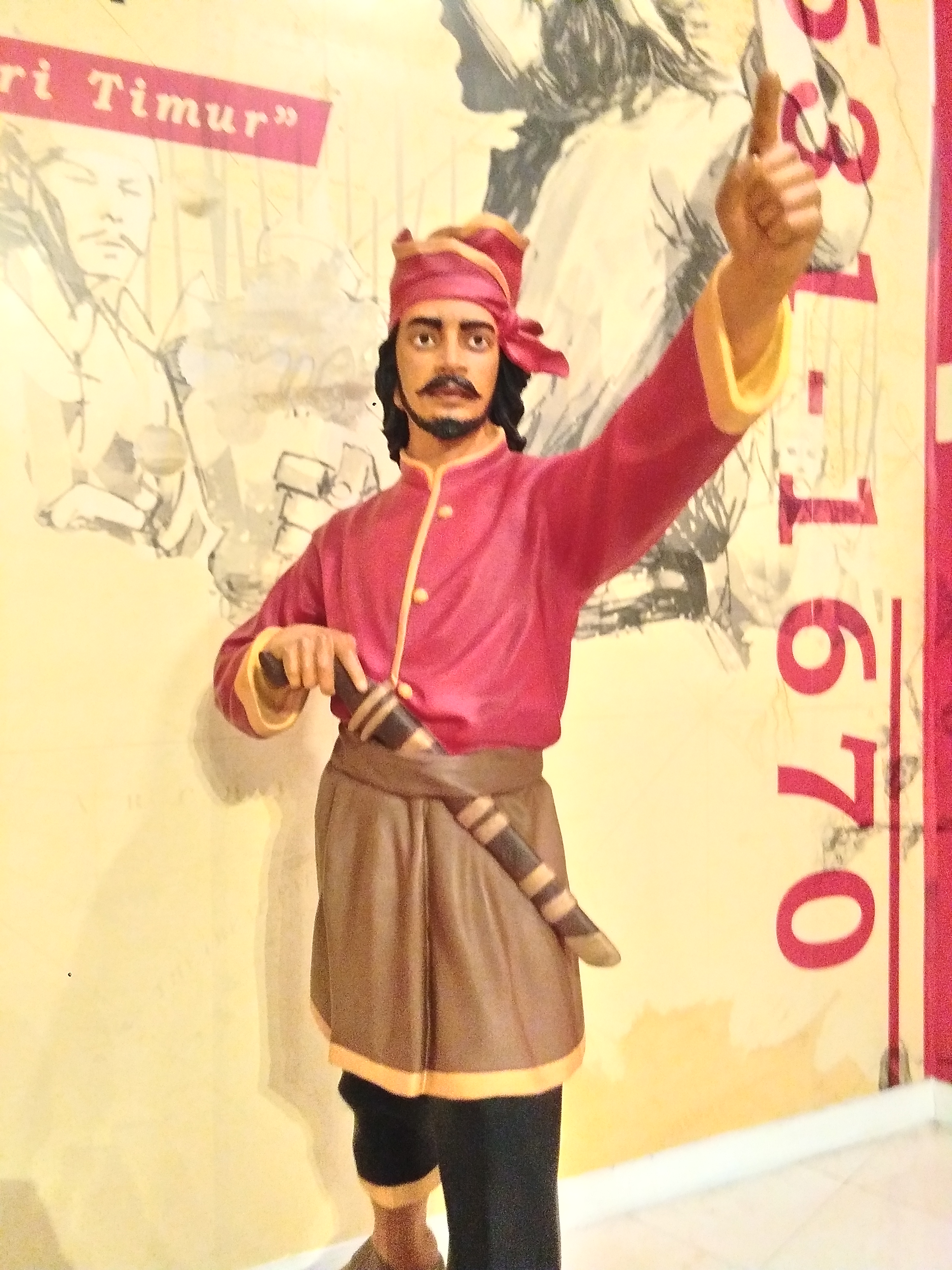
Wax Statue of Sultan Hasanuddin

Gowa's defeat by the Company might have caused its Bugis vassal state of Bone to rise in rebellion in 1660, led by Hasanuddin's future nemesis Arung Palakka. Hasannudin crushed this rebellion, reportedly with great cruelty. Arung Palakka fled to Batavia and became a mercenary in the VOC's army for a while, while large numbers of Buginese rebels also gathered in Buton, now a vassal state of the Company.

Hasanudin began preparing for another conflict with the VOC even before the treaty had even taken effect. Further strengthening the already mighty fortification of Makassar, he sealed the city's entire coastline with a brick wall nearly eleven kilometers long. He also refused to banish the Portuguese living in Makassar, since being enemies of the Dutch they would be vital allies. Sensing the hostility, the Company evacuated its lodge in Makassar in 1665, and 1666 a new fleet were sent to attack Makassar again, under Cornelis Speelman. The fleet consisted of the flagship Tertholen, and twenty other vessels carrying some 1860 people, among them 818 sailors, 578 European soldiers, and 395 native troops from Ambon under Captain Joncker and from Bugis under Arung Palakka and Arung Belo Tosa'deng. Speelman also accepted Sultan Ternate's offer to contribute a number of his war canoes for the war against Gowa. Arung Palakka were dropped off at the island of Kambaena, to launch his own personal campaign to sow discontent among the Buginese, raising them in rebellion. Still wary of the impressive fortifications of Makassar, the Hoge Regering instructed Speelman only to raid the coast in several places, and to have his allies do all the fighting, sparing his European troops. Again Hasannudin were forced to negotiate, signing the treaty of Bongaya in 1667, which further restricted the sovereignty of Makassar. Nevertheless, within a few months he would abrogate the treaty, and Speelman was again sent to attack.

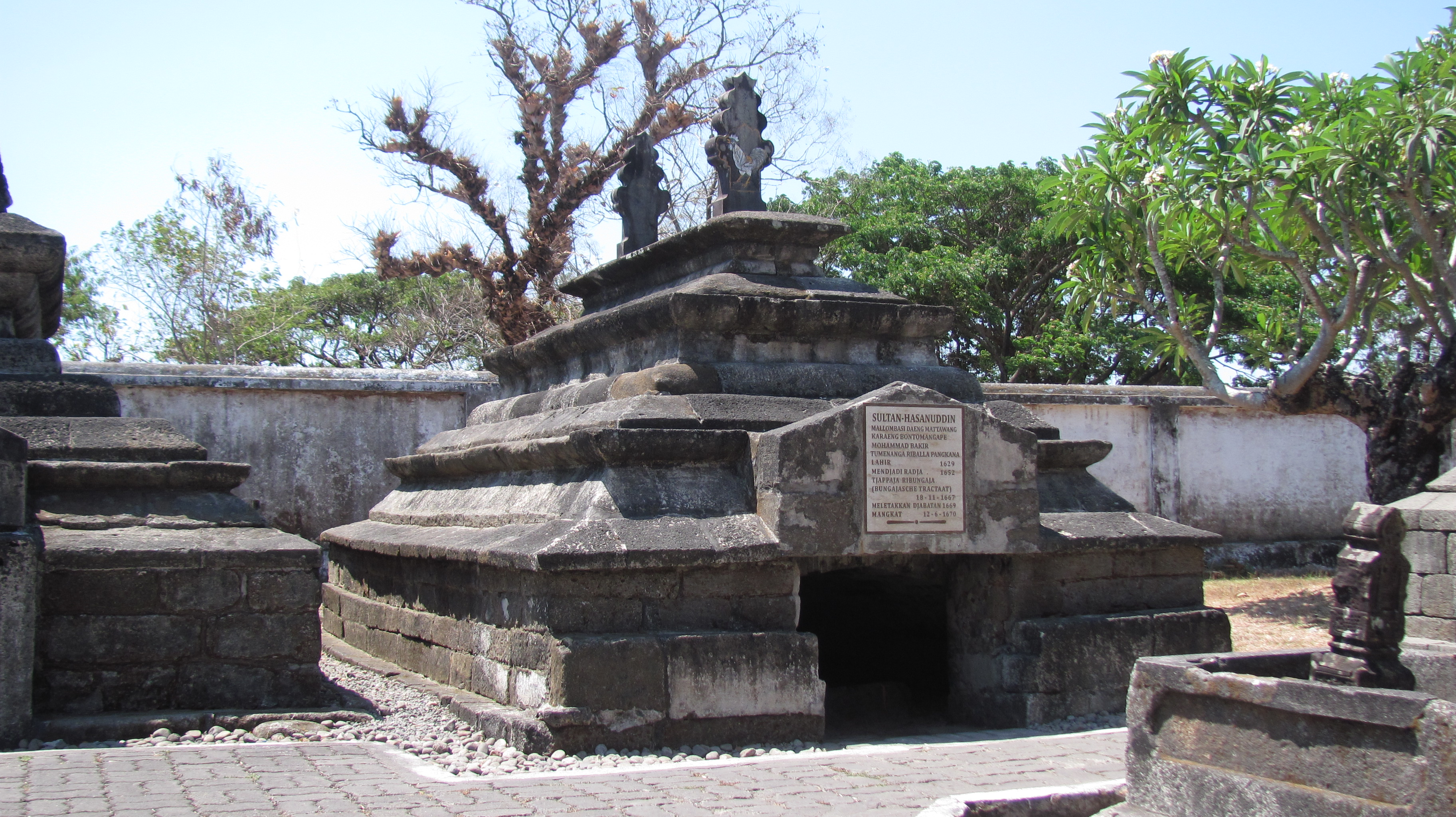
Tomb of Sultan Hasanuddin at Katangka, Somba Opu district, Gowa city, South Sulawesi province

Eventually, Arung Palakka were so successful in stirring up discontent among the Butonese and Buginese that he was able to assemble an army of 10,000 men, for which the company provided transports to join its war effort. With this large force in hand Speelman felt confident enough to attack Makassar directly, despite his orders. Nevertheless, the fortifications of Makassar proved its worth as the VOC fleet exhausted all its ammunition in a useless bombardment, failing to breach Sombaopu's defense. The Company and its allies besieged the city for two and a half years, with diseases taking its toll on the attackers that at one point only 250 European soldiers were fit for service. Finally overcoming the defense through sapping on 12 June 1669, the company made Makassar its puppet state, tearing down the defenses of Sombaopu and erecting Fort Rotterdam in its place.
