= Karaeng Pattingalloang =

Statesman and scholar in Gowa, Indonesia (c.1600–1654)

Karaeng Pattingalloang (c. 1600–1654) was the chief minister of the Kingdom of Gowa in South Sulawesi, Indonesia. Pattingalloang was the second son of Karaeng Matoaya (c.1573-1636), who was the ruler of the Kingdom of Tallo and chief minister (Tuma'bicara-butta) of the partner kingdom of Gowa during its meteoric rise to one of the leading independent ports of Southeast Asia. Pattingalloang succeeded his father as chief minister from 1639 until his death.
The young Pattingalloang was likely partly educated by the Portuguese, who were the largest European minority in the city, since as an adult he spoke Portuguese "as fluently as people from Lisbon itself". He compiled a substantial library of European books in Portuguese, Spanish and Latin, as well as Malay, and sponsored (if he did not author himself) a number of translations of military manuals into Makassarese. He may have been the first Southeast Asian to understand the importance of mathematics for European scientific and military achievements. French Jesuit Alexandre de Rhodes declared him "exceedingly wise and sensible", despite his adherence to Islam. He "had read with curiosity al the chronicles of our European kings. He always had books of ours in hand, especially those treating with mathematics, in which he was quite well versed."

He pestered visiting ships for books and rarities. In 1644 the chief minister sent a shipload of sandalwood to Dutch Batavia to pay for a large globe depicting the latest discoveries, with descriptions to be not in Dutch but in Spanish, Portuguese or Latin. This order took many years for the leading Amsterdam mapmakers to fulfil. When completed it was one of the largest such globes ever made, and inspired other extravagant globes for royal households. The globe destined for Europe arrived only after his death, and was not appreciated by his successors.

In statecraft, Pattingalloang steered his country expertly between quarrelling Europeans and Muslims, insisting against Dutch demands for monopoly that his port would remain open to all. Only after his death did Makassar fall under the joint pressure of Bugis rebellion and Dutch military attack. Even one of his Dutch adversaries conceded he was "a man of great knowledge, science and understanding."
