= Sultanate of Gowa =

Former sultanate in Southern Sulawesi

Sultanate of Gowa ᨔᨚᨅᨐ ᨑᨗ ᨁᨚᨓ (Makasar) Sombayya ri Gowa
- 1320–1957
- Flag

- Sultanate of Gowa at its greatest peak, c. 1658. Light green represents varying degrees of influence.
- Capital: Tamalate (1320–1548); Somba Opu (1548–1670); Kalegowa (1670–1680; 1692–1702; 1753–1895); Ujung Tanah (1680–1684); Mangallekana (1684–1692); Balla Kiria (1702–1720); Katangka (1720–1722); Pabienang (1722–1727); Mallengkeri (1727–1753); Jongaya (1895–1906); Sungguminasa (1936–present)
- Common languages: Makassarese
- Religion: Sunni Islam
- Government: Monarchy
- Sultan, Karaeng Sombayya ri Gowa
  - 1300: Tumanurung
  - 1653–1669: Hasanuddin
  - 1946–1957: Aiduddin
  - 2018–2024: Malikussaid II, Andi Kumala Idjo
  - 2024–present: Muhammad IV, Andi Muhammad Imam Daeng Situju
- History
  - Established: 1320
  - Dissolution of Sultanate: 1957
- Currency: Jingaraʼ, Gold and copper coins was used in circulation, the Barter system was used
Preceded by	Succeeded by
Gowa and Tallo; Majapahit	Dutch East Indies; Republic of Indonesia
- Today part of: Indonesia (as Gowa Regency)

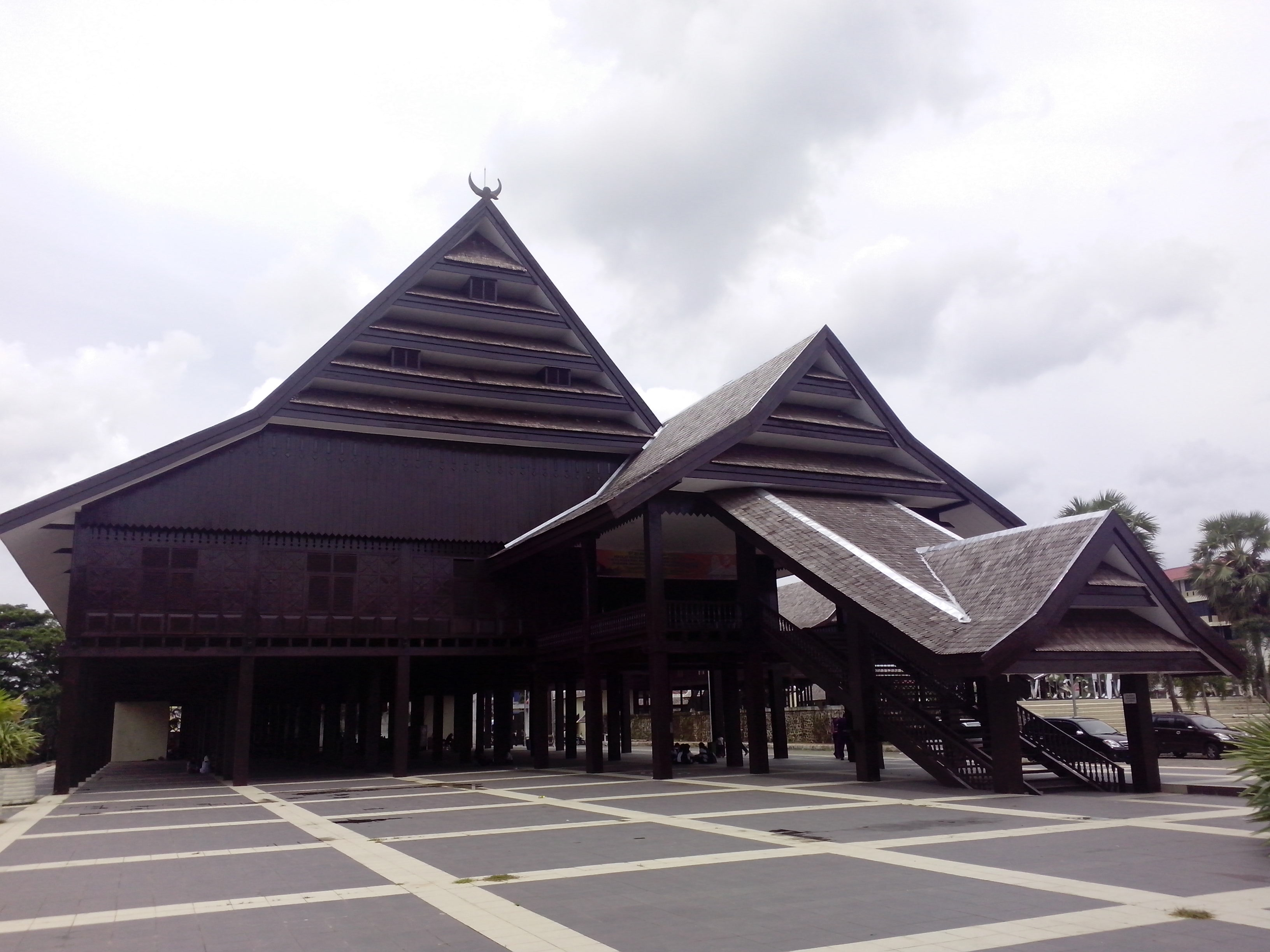
Tamalate Palace in Sungguminasa, Gowa Regency

The Sultanate of Gowa was one of the great kingdoms in the history of Indonesia and the most successful kingdom in the South Sulawesi region. People of this kingdom come from the Makassarese people who lived in the south end and the west coast of southern Sulawesi.

== History ==
Before the establishment of the kingdom, the region had been known as Makassar and its people as Makassarese. The history of the kingdom can be divided into two eras: pre-Islamic kingdom and post-Islamic sultanate.

=== Early history ===
The epic poem the Nagarakretagama, in praise of King Rajasanagara of Majapahit, lists Makassar as one of the kingdom's tributaries in 1365.

The first queen of Gowa was Tomanurung Baine. Not much is known about the exact time when the kingdom was established nor about the first queen, and only during the reign of the 6th king, Tonatangka Kopi, have local sources noted about the division of the kingdom into two new kingdoms led by two Kopi's sons: Kingdom of Gowa led by Batara Gowa as its 7th king covering areas of Paccelekang, Pattalasang, Bontomanai Ilau, Bontomanai 'Iraya, Tombolo and Mangasa while the other son, Karaeng Loe ri Sero, led a new kingdom called Tallo which included areas of Saumata, Pannampu, Moncong Loe, and Parang Loe.

For years both kingdoms were involved in wars until the kingdom of Tallo was defeated. During the reign of King of Gowa X, Tunipalangga (1512-1546), the two kingdoms were reunified to become twin kingdoms under a deal called Rua Kareng se're ata (dual kings, single people in Makassarese) and enforced with a binding treaty. Since then, any king of Tallo also became the king of Gowa. Many historians then simply call these Gowa-Tallo twin kingdoms as Makassar or just Gowa.

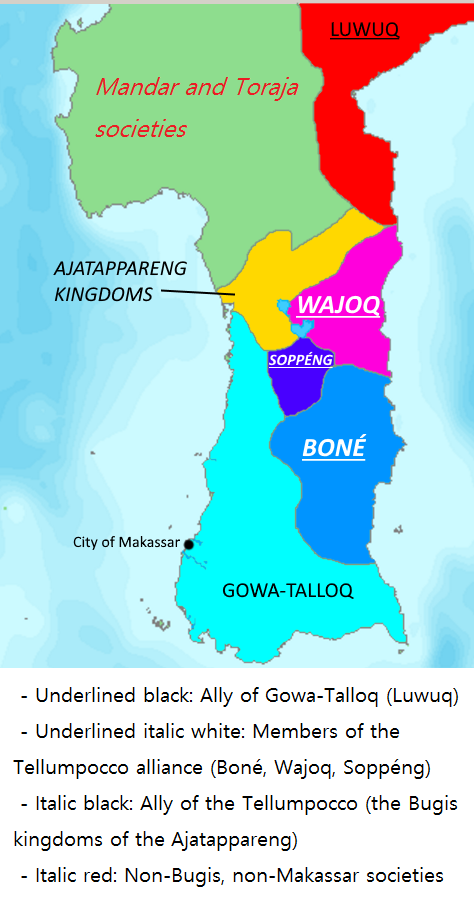
Geopolitical map of kingdoms in South Sulawesi in 16th century

=== Islamic Sultanate ===
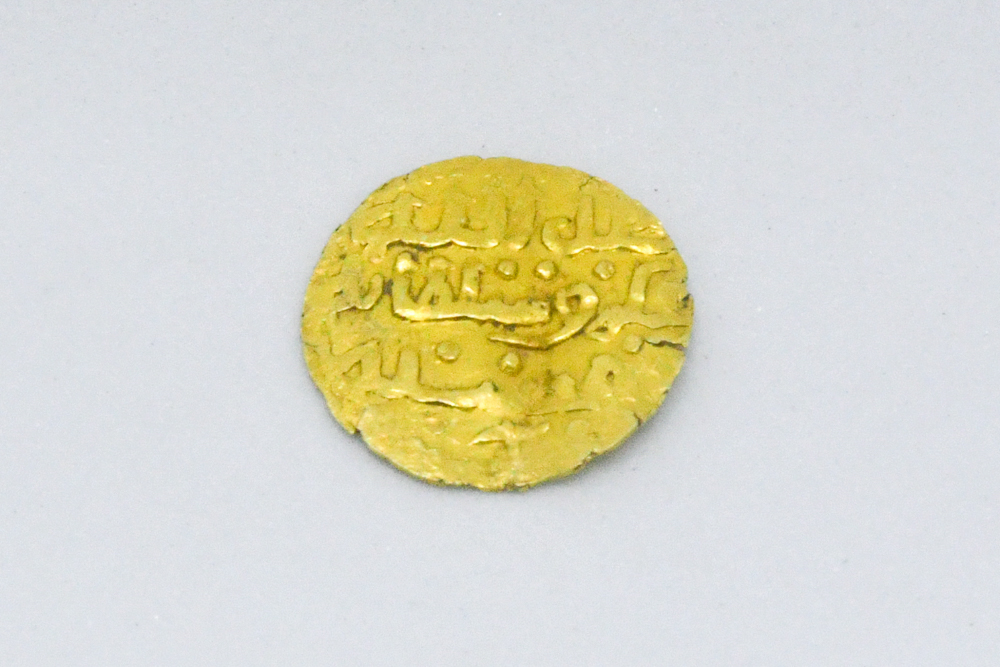
Gold coins of the Gowa-Tallo Sultanate era, during the reign of Sultan Abdul Khairul Mansur Shah (1739-1742).

Traces of Islam in southwest Sulawesi existed since the 1320's upon the arrival of the first Sayyid, Jamaluddin al-Akbar Al-Husaini, who was the grandfather of the Wali Songo.

The conversion of Tallo-Gowa to Islam is traditionally dated to September 22, 1605, when Karaeng Matowaya Tumamenaga Ri Agamanna, the 14th king, converted to Islam, later changing his name to Sultan Alauddin and establishing the kingdom as the Sultanate of Gowa. He ruled the sultanate from 1591 to 1629. His conversion to Islam is associated with the arrival of three ulama from Minangkabau: Datuk Ri Bandang, Datuk Ri Tiro and Datuk Ri Pattimang.

Gowa's patronage of Islam caused it to try and encourage neighboring kingdoms to accept Islam, an offer which they refused. In response in 1611, the sultanate launched a series of campaigns, locally called the "Islamic wars", which resulted in the subjugation and Islamization all of southwest Sulawesi, including their rival Bone. The war later extended to Sumbawa, which was invaded in 1618 and the rulers were forced to convert to Islam. Religious zeal from the rulers was an important factor behind the campaigns, as they saw the conquests as a justified religious act. However, Gowa also desired to expand the political and economic influence of Gowa as it experienced rapid political growth during the 17th century. It was a subsequent stage in a historical rivalry between the states of the region for political control.

According to Indonesian historian Daeng Patunru, in the case of the Bugis kingdoms, the ruler of Gowa initially conquered them due to their growing political power which would undermine Gowa's authority and sphere of influence. Other scholars contend that the conflict with the Bugis was originally started due to the upholding of an old treaty that stated that the Gowa and the Bugis kingdoms were to share and convince the others if they were to discover "a spark of goodness" which in this case Gowa contended was the religion of Islam.

Varying levels of resistance against Gowa from nearby states to consider Islam and its military forces determined the relationship the defeated state would have with Gowa, which were based on socially hierarchical kinship positions. This included strict vassalage and defeated rulers and populations having subordinate or enslaved positions within the empire. This scheme of hierarchical relations and subordinate positions in relation to a more powerful state has ancient roots in the region which predate Islam. The one difference added to this ancient tradition was that the defeated ruler had to profess the shahadah which also served as an acceptance of submission to Gowa. The defeated populations of the states were not commonly forced to convert.

After the conquests, Gowa pursued a policy of religious proselytization within the defeated kingdoms, which included sending Javanese preachers to teach the religion among the masses and establish Islamic institutions. At that time, the Sultanate of Gowa also intended to invade and control Gorontalo region via Limboto by entering with its naval fleet at Tolinggula. However, it was later discovered that envoys from Gorontalo managed to persuade representatives of the Sultanate of Gowa in negotiations not to attack them.

=== War against the Dutch and Bugis ===
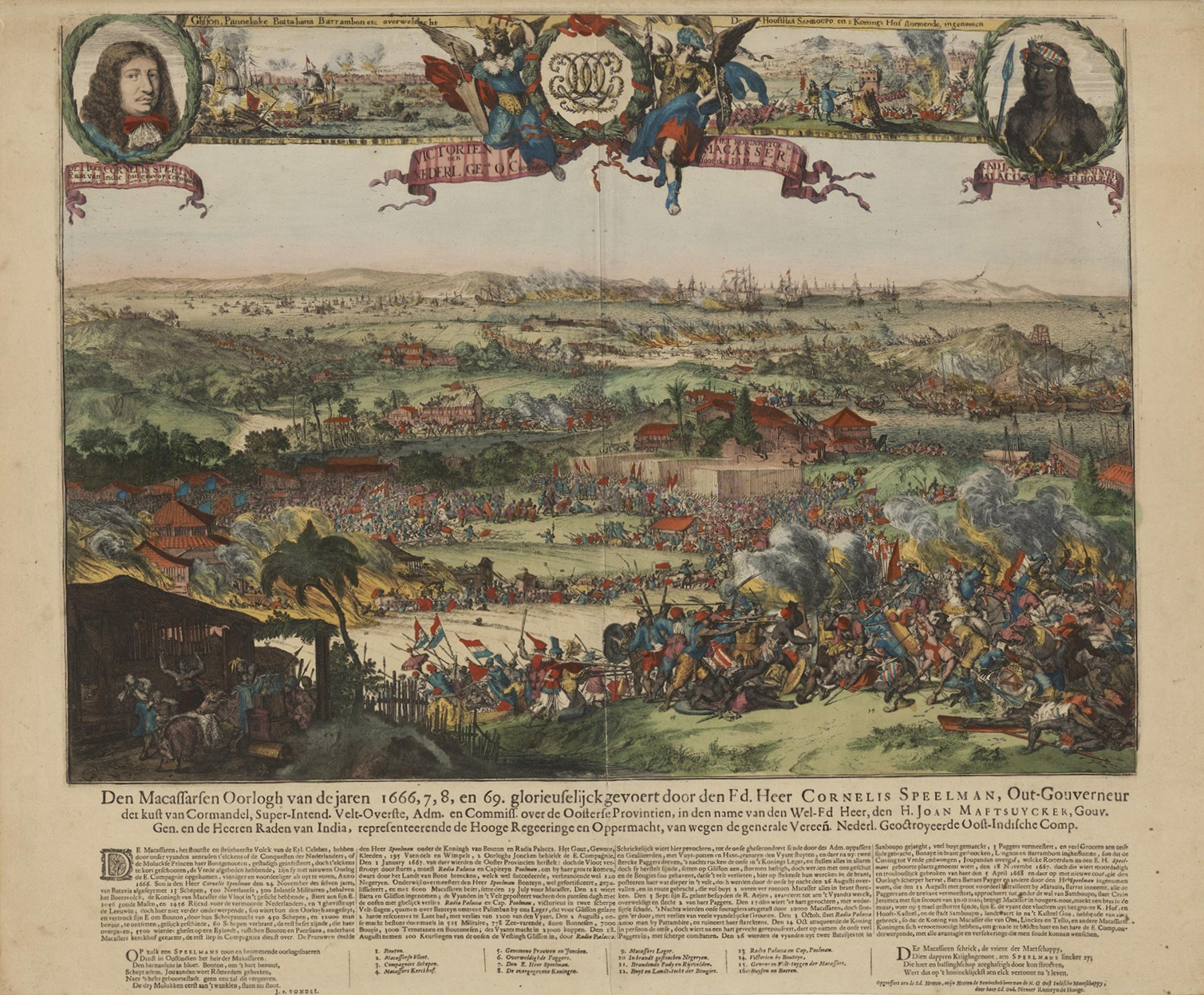
Makassar War, 1666 to 1669.

From 1630 until the early twentieth century, Gowa's political leaders and Islamic functionaries were both recruited from the ranks of the nobility. Since 1607, sultans of Makassar established a policy of welcoming all foreign traders. In 1613, an English factory built in Makassar. This began the hostilities of English-Dutch against Makassar.

In 1644, Bone rose up against Gowa. The Battle of Passempe saw Bone defeated and a regent heading an Islamic religious council installed. In 1660 Arung Palakka, the long-haired prince of the Sultanate of Bonu, led a Bugis revolt against Gowa, but failed.

In 1666, under the command of Admiral Cornelis Speelman, The Dutch East India Company (VOC) attempted to bring the small kingdoms in the North under their control, but did not manage to subdue the Sultanate of Gowa. After Hasanuddin ascended to the throne as the 16th sultan of Gowa, he tried to combine the power of the small kingdoms in eastern Indonesia to fight the VOC, which was assisted by the prince of Bone kingdom of Bugis dynasty, Arung Palakka.

On the morning of 24 November 1666, the VOC expedition and the Eastern Quarters set sail under the command of Speelman. The fleet consisted of the admiralship Tertholen, and twenty other vessels carrying some 1,860 people, among them 818 Dutch sailors, 578 Dutch soldiers, and 395 native troops from Ambon under Captain Joncker and from Bugis under Arung Palakka and Arung Belo Tosa'deng. Speelman also accepted Sultan Ternate's offer to contribute a number of his war canoes for the war against Gowa. A week after June 19, 1667, Speelman's armada set sail toward Sulawesi and Makassar from Butung. When the fleet reached the Sulawesi coast, Speelman received news of the abortive Bugis uprising in Bone in May and of the disappearance of Arung Palakka during the crossing from the island of Kambaena.

The war later broke in 1666 between the VOC and the sultanate of Gowa and continued until 1669, after the VOC had landed its strengthened troops in a desperate and ultimately weakening Gowa. On 18 November 1667 the Treaty of Bungaya was signed by the major belligerents in a premature attempt to end the war.

Feeling aggrieved, Hasanuddin started the war again. Finally, the VOC requested assistance for additional troops from Batavia. Battles broke out again in various places with Sultan Hasanuddin giving fierce resistance. Military reinforcements sent from Batavia strengthened the VOC's military capability, allowing it to break the Sultanate of Gowa's strongest fortress in Somba Opu on June 12, 1669, which finally marked the end of the war. Sultan Hasanuddin resigned from the royal throne, dying exactly a year later on June 12, 1670.

After the Makassar war, Admiral Cornelis Speelman destroyed the large fortress in Somba Opu, and built up Fort Rotterdam (Speelman named this fortress after his birthplace in Netherlands) in its place as the headquarters of VOC activities in Sulawesi. In 1672 Arung Palakka was raised to the throne to become the sultan of Bone.

=== Dissolution of Sultanate ===
Since 1673 the area around Fort Rotterdam grew into a city currently known as Makassar. Since 1904 the Dutch colonial government had engaged in the South Sulawesi expedition and started war against small kingdoms in South Sulawesi, including Gowa. In 1911 the Sultanate lost its independence after losing the war and became one of the Dutch Indies' regencies. Following the Indonesian Independence from Netherlands in 1945, the sultanate dissolved and has since become part of the Republic of Indonesia and the former region becomes part of Gowa Regency.

== Government ==
=== Political administration ===
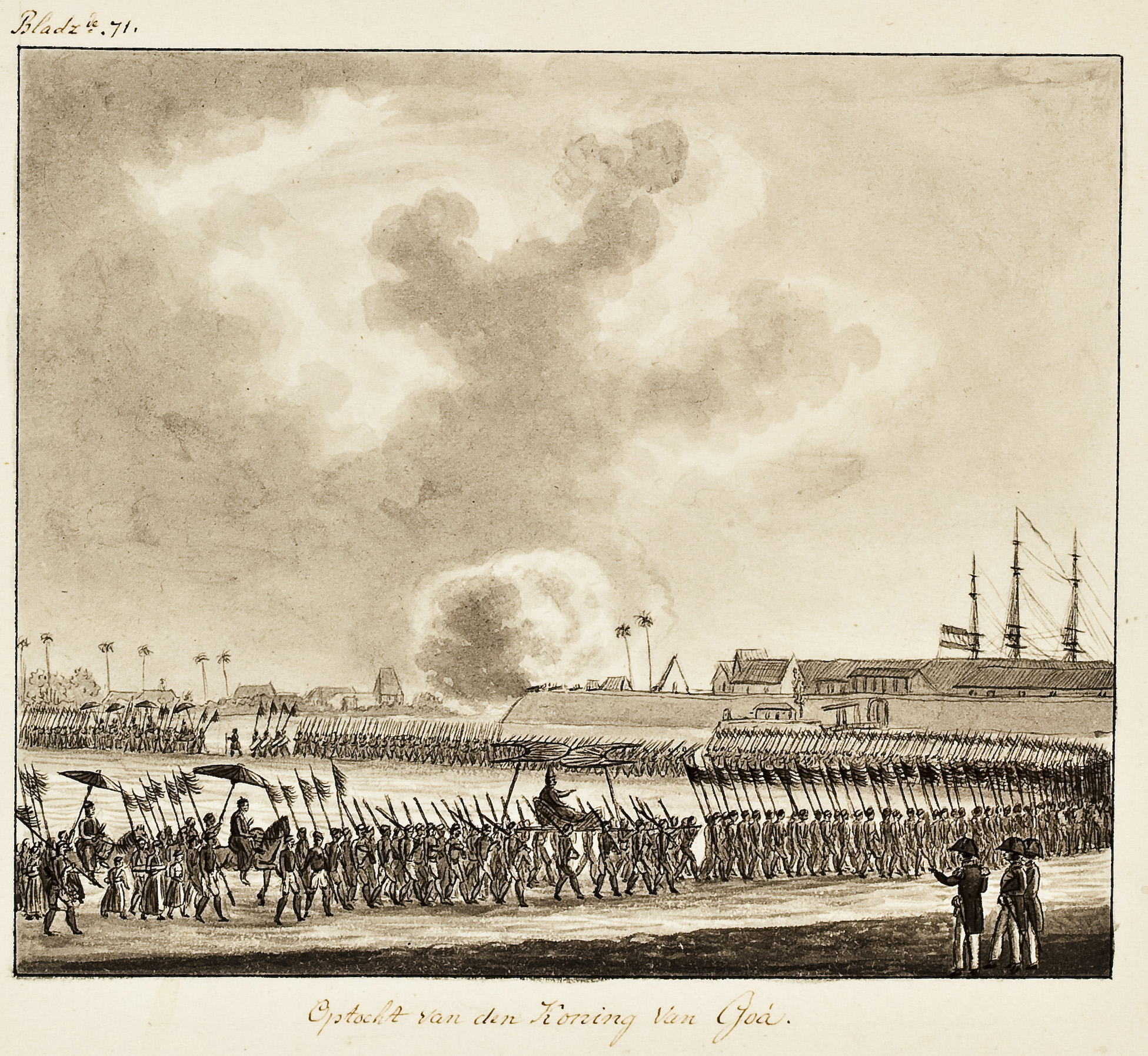
Procession of the King of Gowa near Dutch Fort Rotterdam in Makassar, Sulawesi, in 1816

The variety of titles used by leaders of small polities is bewildering: anrongguru, dampang, gallarrang, jannang, kare, kasuiang, lao, loqmoq, todo, and more besides. All were local titles Makassarese used before the rise of Gowa. Gowa's expansion brought some systematic order to this variety.

Granting titles was an important method of establishing and recognizing a given person/s and a given community's place within society. Ideally, but not always in fact, this hierarchy of titles corresponded to the natural hierarchy of the white blood that the nobles possessed. Distinguishing nobles from commoners, for example, was the right to have a royal or daeng name as well as a personal name. Distinguishing lower ranking nobles such as anaq ceraq from higher-ranking nobles like anaq tiqno was the latter's right to a karaeng title. Granted by the ruler of Gowa, karaeng titles not only signified the bearer's accepted high status, but were often toponyms that gace the bearer the right to demand tribute and labor from the community of that name.

Offices did become the domain of the nobles with karaeng titles. The most important of these was Tumabicarabutta, whose task it was to assist the ruler of Gowa as regent and chief advisor. This pattern of the ruler of Talloq advising the ruler of Gowa became the norm in the first part of the 17th century.

Another important office was Tumailalang (literally, "the person on the inside"), the trio of ministers. From the title it appears that the Tumailalang were inchange of managing everyday affairs within Gowa, there was a join tumailalang-sabannaraq office during the reign of Tumapaqsiriq Kallonna. During the subsequent reign, Tunipalannga separated these offices and by the reign of Tunijalloq, there were 2 Tumailalang, later known as the elder tumailalang toa and the younger tumailalang lolo. All holders of the Tumailalang posts were high-ranking karaengs.

=== List of rulers ===
Rulers of Gowa used the title Karaeng Sombayya ri Gowa meaning "the king who is worshipped in Gowa", shortened to Karaeng Gowa, Somba Gowa, KaraengE ri Gowa or KaraengE. Islamic period of Gowa started during the reign of I Mangarangi Daeng Manrabbiya Sultan Alauddin in 1605.

List of Rulers of Gowa
No	Monarch	Lifetime	Reign	Additional info
1	Tumanurung		Mid-14th century	
2	Tumassalangga Baraya			
3	I Puang Loe Lembang			
4	Tuniatabanri			
5	Karampang ri Gowa			
6	Tunatangkalopi			
7	Batara Gowa, titled Tumenanga ri Parallakkenna			
8	Tunijalloʼ ri Passukkiʼ			
9	Tumapaʼrisiʼ Kallonna		1511 - 1546	
10	I Manriwagauʼ Daeng Bonto Karaeng Lakiung Tunipallangga		1546 - 1565	
11	I Tajibarani Daeng Marompa Karaeng Dataʼ Tunibatte		1565 (only 40 days)	
12	I Manggorai Daeng Mammeta Tunijalloʼ		1565 - 1590	
13	I Tepukaraeng Daeng Paraʼbung Tunipasuluʼ (deposed)		1590 - 1593	
14	I Manngarangi Daeng Manrabbia Sultan Alauddin, titled Tumenanga ri Gaukanna	1586 - 15 June 1639	1593 - 15 June 1639	
15	I Mannuntungi Daeng Mattola Karaeng Lakiung Sultan Malikussaid, titled Tumenanga ri Papambatuna	11 Dec 1607 - 5 Nov 1653	1639 - 5 Nov 1653	
16	I Mallombassi Daeng Mattawang Karaeng Bontomangape Sultan Hasanuddin, titled Tumenanga ri Ballaʼ Pangkana	12 Jan 1631 - 12 June 1670	1653 - 17 June 1669	
17	I Mappasomba Daeng Nguraga Sultan Amir Hamzah, titled Tumenanga ri Alluʼ	31 Mar 1657 - 7 May 1674	1669 - 1674	
18	I Mappaossong Daeng Mangewai Karaeng Bisei Sultan Muhammad Ali, titled Tumenanga ri Jakattaraʼ	29 Nov 1654 - 15 Aug 1681	1674 - 1677	
19	I Mappadulung Daeng Mattimung Karaeng Sanrobone Sultan Abdul Jalil, titled Tumenanga ri Lakiung		1677 - 1709	
20	La Pareppa Tusappewali Sultan Ismail, titled Tumenanga ri Somba Opu		1709 - 1712	
21	I Mappauʼrangi Karaeng Kanjilo Sultan Sirajuddin, titled Tumenanga ri Pasi		1712 - 1739 1739 - 1742	
23	I Mappasempe Daeng Mamaro Karaeng Bontolangkasaʼ		1739	
24	I Mappababasa Sultan Abdul Kudus		1742 - 1753	
25	Batara Gowa Sultan Fakhruddin (exiled to Sri Lanka)		1753 - 1767	
26	I Mallisujawa Daeng Riboko Arungmampu Sultan Imaduddin, titled Tumenanga ri Tompobalang		1767 - 1769	
27	I Makkaraeng Karaeng Tamasongoʼ Sultan Zainuddin, titled Tumenanga ri Mattowanging		1769 - 1777	
28	I Mannawarri Karaeng Bontolangkasaʼ Sultan Abdul Hadi		1779 - 1810	
29	I Mappatunru Karaeng Lembangparang, titled Tumenanga ri Katangka		1816 - 1825	
30	Karaeng Katangka Sultan Abdul Rahman, titled Tumenanga ri Suangga		1825	
31	I Kumala Karaeng Lembangparang Sultan Abdul Kadir, titled Tumenaga ri Kakuasanna	d. 30 January 1893	1825 - 30 Jan 1893	
32	I Mallingkaang Daeng Manyonri Karaeng Katangka Sultan Idris, titled Tumenanga ri Kalabbiranna	d. 18 May 1895	Jan 1893 - 18 May 1895	
33	I Makkulau Daeng Serang Karaeng Lembangparang Sultan Husain, titled Tumenang ri Bundu'na		18 May 1895 - 13 April 1906	
34	I Mangngimangngi Daeng Matutu Karaeng Bontonompoʼ Sultan Muhibuddin, titled Tumenanga ri Sungguminasa		1936 - 1946	
35	Andi Ijo Daeng Mattawang Karaeng Lalolang Sultan Aiduddin	d. 1978	1946 - 1957	1957 - 1960 as the first Regent of Gowa Regency

== Gallery ==
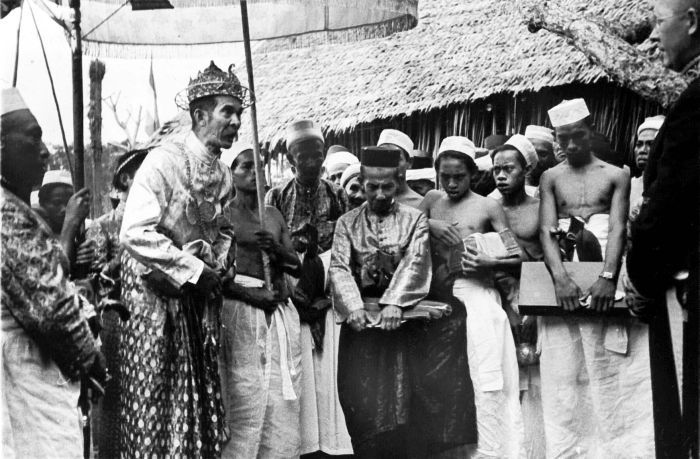
I Mangngimangngi Daeng Matutu Karaeng Bontonompo Sultan Muhammad Thahir Muhibuddin Tumenanga ri Sungguminasa (1936-1946) during the appointment of G.A. Bosselaar as Governor of Celebes (early 1930s)

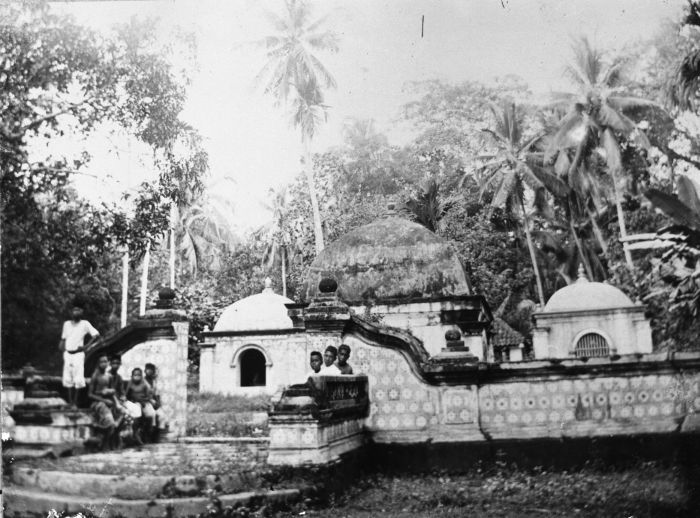
Burial place of the princes of Gowa (1)

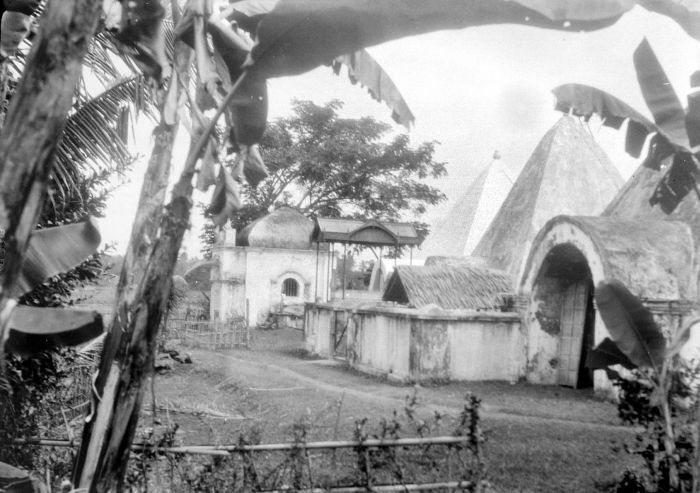
Burial place of the princes of Gowa (2)

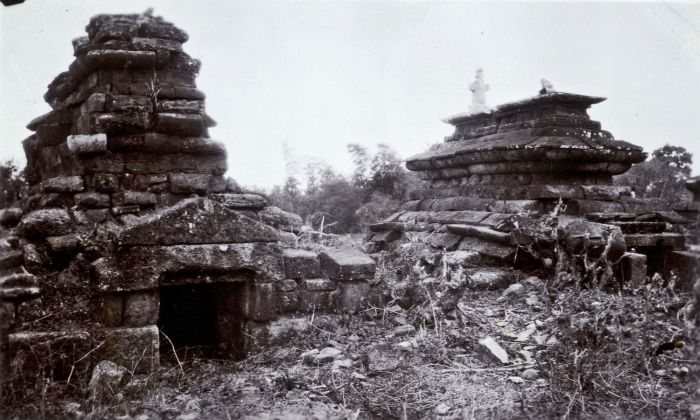
Burial place of the princes of Gowa (3)

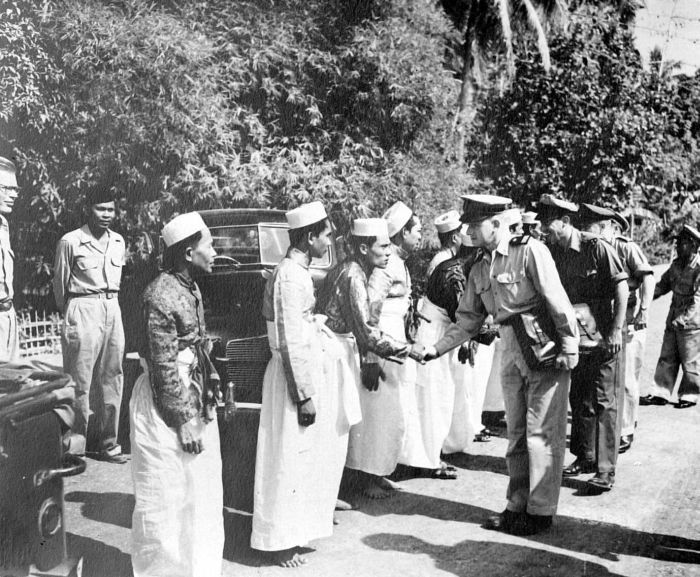
The arrival of Dutch authorities who would attend the signing of the Short Statement by Raja Gowa in Sungguminassa

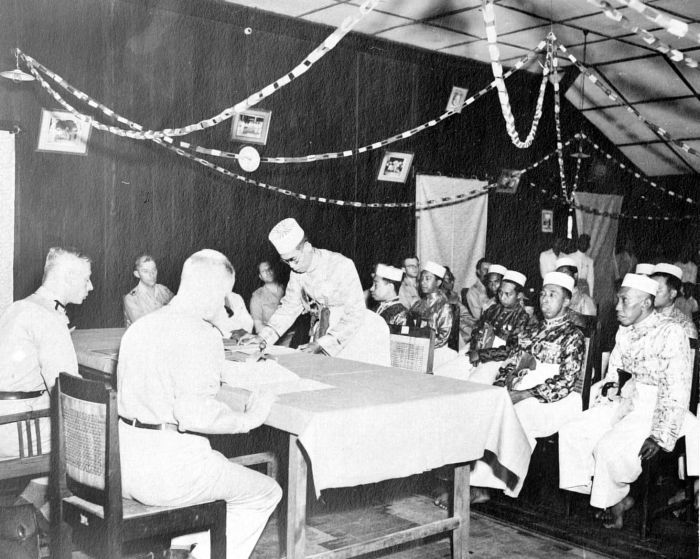
Raja (King) of Gowa signed the Brief Statement at his home

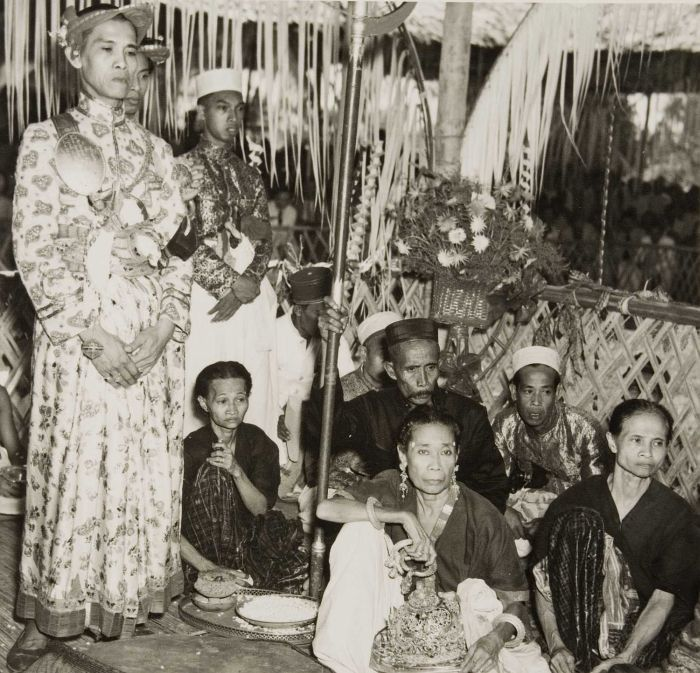
Coronation of the Raja of Gowa

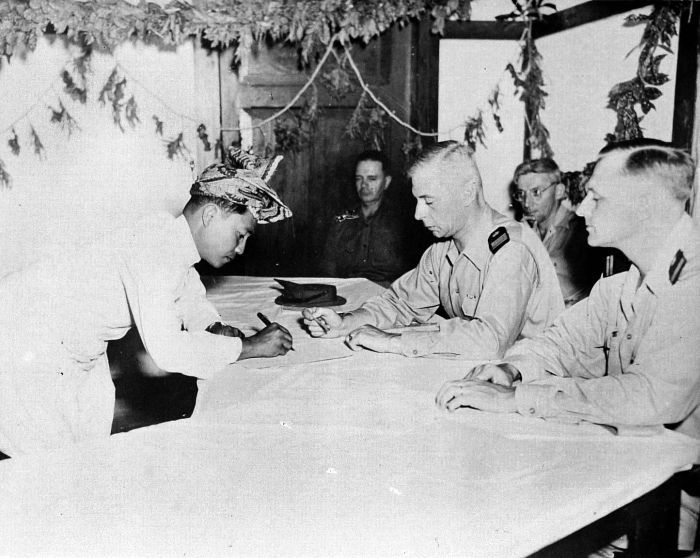
On October 15, 1946, seven tribe rulers signed the Brief Declaration in front of the resident of South Sulawesi Lion Cachet

== See also ==
- Makassan contact with Australia
- Bone Sultanate
- Sultanate of Ternate
- Sultanate of Tidore
- Makassar
- Gowa Regency
