= Treaty of Bongaya =

1667 treaty between the Kingdom of Gowa and the VOC

The Treaty of Bongaya (also spelled Bongaja) was signed on November 18, 1667, between Hasanuddin of Gowa, ruler of the Sultanate of Gowa, and the Dutch East India Company (VOC). In the midst of the Second Anglo-Dutch War Hasanuddin launched a war against the Sultanate of Ternate, but the Dutch were able to defeat his forces.

The treaty resulted in all non-Dutch Europeans being banned from Makassar. Only one of Hasanuddin's forts was allowed to continue to exist and the Dutch seized what later became Fort Rotterdam. Gowa was reduced to a vassal and its dependencies were transferred to the VOC.

== Background ==
Hasanuddin of Gowa, ruler of the Sultanate of Gowa, was aligned with the Kingdom of England. Dutch failures in the Second Anglo-Dutch War embolden Hasanuddin to not compromise with the Dutch. Hasanuddin sent 6,000 men against the Sultanate of Ternate and he achieved several victories against Ternate's fleet before Dutch commissioner Jan van Wesenhagen arrived to negotiate. The Dutch East India Company (VOC) declared war on Gowa on 5 October 1666, and achieved multiple victories before entering into negotiations with Hasanuddin on 19 October.

== Content ==
On 18 November 1667, the Treaty of Bongaya was signed between Gowa and the VOC. The Englishmen in Makassar were taken as prisoners by the Dutch. The treaty prohibited all Europeans, except the Dutch, from Makassar. Makassar's port was placed under the same Dutch monopoly present in the rest of the Dutch East Indies.

Gowa's dependicies, such as Minahasa, were transferred to the Netherlands and Gowa was reduced to a vassal of the VOC. Hasanuddin was required to destroy all of his fortresses except for the one at his royal residence in Samboepo. Jum Pandan, a stronghold that would be converted into Fort Rotterdam, was ceded to the Dutch.

A day of celebration was held in Batavia when news of the treaty reached it in March 1668.

== See also ==
- List of treaties

== Works cited ==
=== Books ===
- Ormrod, David; Rommelse, Gijs (2020). War, Trade and the State: Anglo-Dutch Conflict, 1652-89. Boydell & Brewer. ISBN 9781787446830.

=== Journals ===
- Bassett, D. (1958). "English Trade in Celebes, 1613-1667". Journal of the Malaysian Branch of the Royal Asiatic Society. 31 (1). Malaysian Branch of the Royal Asiatic Society: 1–39. doi:10.2307/41503122. JSTOR 41503122.
- Nawawi, Mohd (1971). "Punitive Colonialism: The Dutch and the Indonesian National Integration". Journal of Southeast Asian Studies. 2 (2). Cambridge University Press: 59–168. doi:10.2307/20069916. JSTOR 20069916.
