= Cornelis Speelman =

Governor-general of the Dutch East Indies (1628–1684)

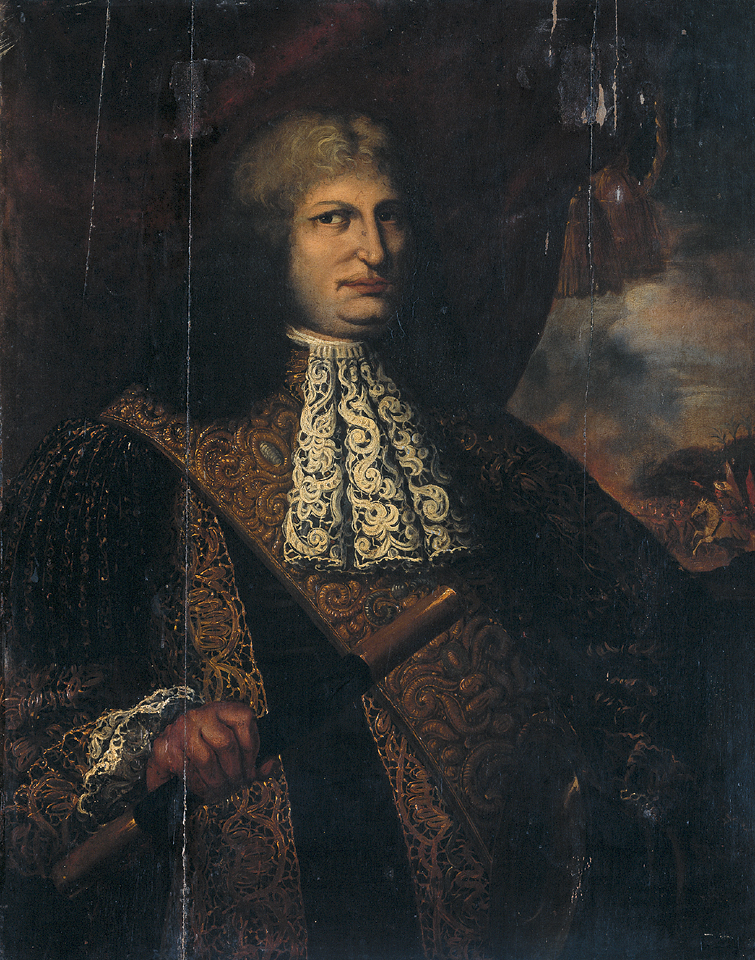
- Portrait of Cornelis Speelman

Governor-General of the Dutch East Indies
- In office 25 November 1681 – 11 January 1684
- Preceded by: Rijcklof van Goens
- Succeeded by: Johannes Camphuys

Personal details
- Born: 2 March 1628 Rotterdam, Dutch Republic
- Died: 11 January 1684 (aged 55) Batavia, Dutch East Indies

Cornelis Janszoon Speelman (2 March 1628 – 11 January 1684) was Governor-General of the Dutch East Indies from 1681 to 1684.

Cornelis Janszoon Speelman was the son of a Rotterdam merchant. He was born on 2 March 1628. In his 16th year, he left aboard the Hillegersberg for the Indies. He was employed as an assistant (assistent) in the service of the Dutch East India Company (VOC).

== Biography ==
In 1645, he arrived in Batavia, Dutch East Indies. He became bookkeeper (boekhouder) in 1648 and second merchant (onderkoopman) in 1649. He became secretary (secretaris) to the Dutch Council of the Indies (Raad van Indië). He travelled with ambassador Joan Cunaeus to Persia that year, and wrote an account of the voyage. They were received by the Shah Abbas II with great festivity. Even before his voyage came to an end, in 1652, he was promoted to buyer (koopman).

On his return to Batavia, he took up a post in the office of the bookkeeper-general (boekhouder-generaal), for whom he deputed for a long time, and whom he succeeded in 1657. Meanwhile, he had married the fifteen-year-old Petronella Maria Wonderaer, daughter to the receiver-general (ontvanger-generaal). In 1659, he was placed in charge of the company's clerical and administrative staff (kapitein over de compagnie pennisten) in Batavia. In 1661, he became schepen van Batavia (a sort of alderman post connected with local government there).

== Career ==
On 12 June 1663, Cornelis Speelman was appointed governor and director of Dutch Coromandel, but was suspended by the Heren XVII (Lords Seventeen), being accused of having illegally engaged in private trading. He had bought a diamond for his wife and later re-sold it because she had not liked it. Despite his strenuous protests, the court in Batavia wanted to make an example of him and he was sentenced to a 15 months suspension and a fine of 3,000 guilders. In 1666, he was named admiral and superintendent of an expedition to Makassar.

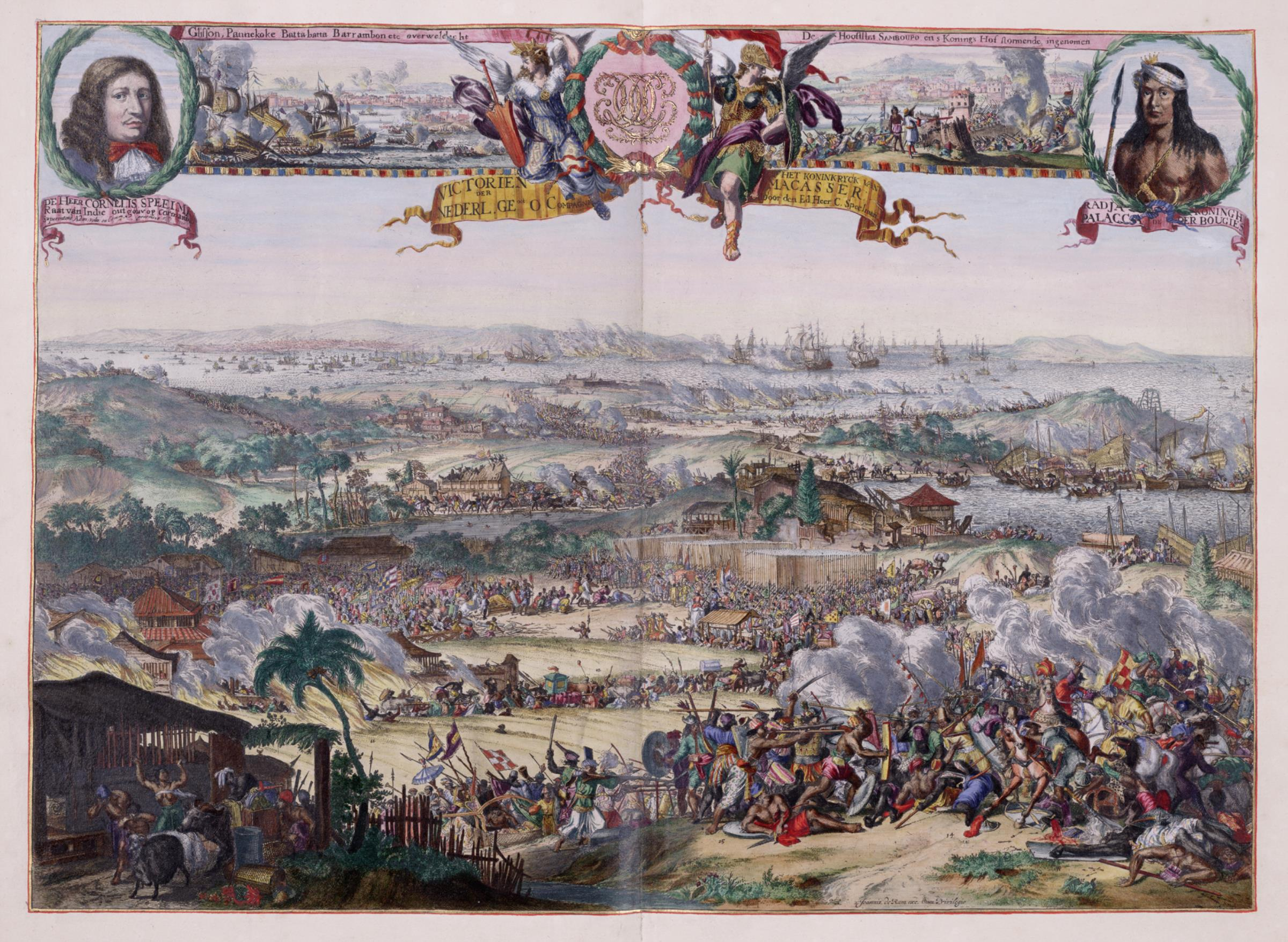
Conquest of Makassar by Speelman, 1666–1669.

On 18 November 1667, he concluded the so-called Bongaais Treaty (Treaty of Bongaya). In the same year, he was named commissioner (commissaris) of Amboina, Banda, and Ternate. Consequently, he became counsellor-extraordinary (raad extra-ordinaris) to the Dutch Council of the Indies. He travelled once again, in 1669, as admiral of another expedition to Makassar where he completely subjugated the kingdom, receiving a gold chain and medallion in recognition of this the following year.

He became a full Counsellor of the Indies on 23 March 1671. The following year he was admiral of a fleet sent against the French. In December 1676, he led an expedition to Central Java, supporting the ruler of Mataram who was facing the Trunajaya rebellion. On Java's East Coast, he went to war against the rebel leader Trunajaya. It took some time before peace was re-established. He was called back to Batavia at the end of 1677 and on 18 January 1678 named First Counsellor and Director-General of the Indies (Eerste Raad en Directeur-Generaal van Indië). Also in that year he was appointed president of the College van Schepenen (to do with local government) in Batavia. On 29 October 1680 he was named governor-general, a post he took up on 25 November 1681, succeeding Rijckloff van Goens.

During the term of office of Cornelis Speelman as governor-general, the sultan of Ternate was defeated. He ceded all his lands of his kingdom to the company. Speelman also subdued the city of Bantam. Cornelis Speelman died on 11 January 1684 in the Castle at Batavia. His funeral was accompanied with great clamour and splendour, for which no pains or monies were spared. He was buried in the Kruiskerk to the salute of 229 cannon shots. He was followed as governor-general by Johannes Camphuys.

== Sources ==
- Site in Dutch dedicated to the VOC
- Encyclopaedie van Nederlandsch-Indië, part Soek-Zij.
- Putten, L.P. van, 2002. – Ambitie en onvermogen : gouverneurs-generaal van Nederlands-Indië 1610–1796.
