= Bernardus =

Bernardus is a Latinized form of the Germanic name Bernard. It has been a given name in the Netherlands since the 17th century, though bearers tend to use a short form in daily life, like Barend, Ben, Ber, Berend, Bernard, Bert, and Bertus. People with this name include:

Latinized names

- Bernardus Carnotensis (Bernard de Chartres; died c. 1124), French Neo-Platonist philosopher, scholar, and administrator
- Bernardus Claravallensis (Bernard de Clairvaux; 1090–1153), French abbot, Saint Bernard
- Bernardus Ultrajectensis (Bernard van Utrecht), late 11th-century Dutch priest and writer
- Bernardus Silvestris (Bernard Silvestre; fl. 1143–48)), French Platonist philosopher and poet
- Bernardus Papiensis (Bernardo Balbi; fl. 1150–1213), Italian canonist and bishop
- Bernardus Compostellanus Antiquus (fl. 1198–1200), Spanish jurist
- Bernardus Compostellanus Junior, 13th-century Spanish priest and writer
- Bernardus Parmensis (Bernardo di Botone; died 1266), Italian canonist
- Bernardus de Trilia (Bernard de la Treille; c. 1240 – 1292), French Dominican theologian and scholastic philosopher
- Bernardus Guidonis (Bernard Gui; 1261–1331), French Dominican inquisitor and writer
- Bernardus Trevisanus (Bernardo da Treviso; 1406–1490), Italian alchemist
- Bernardus Oricellarius (Bernardo Rucellai; 1448–1514), Florentine politician and humanist
- Bernardus Clesius (Bernhard von Cles; 1484–1539), Austrian cardinal, bishop, prince, diplomat, humanist and botanist
- Bernardus Paludanus (Berent ten Broecke; 1550–1633), Dutch scientist and physician

Given names

- Bernardus Accama (1697–1756), Dutch historical and portrait painter
- Bernardus Johannes Alfrink (1900–1987), Dutch Roman archbishop and cardinal
- Bernardus Antonie "Bernard" van Beek (1875–1941), Dutch landscape painter
- Bernardus Johannes "Bernard" Blommers (1845–1914), Dutch etcher and painter
- Bernardus P.J.N. "Bernard" Bolzano (1781–1841), Bohemian mathematician, logician, philosopher, and theologian
- Bernardus Joannes "Bertus" Caldenhove (1914–1983), Dutch footballer
- Bernardus J.K. Cramer (1890–1978), Dutch architect
- Bernardus Croon (1886–1960), Dutch rower
- Bernardus Gerhardus "Brand" Fourie (1916–2008), South African ambassador to the United States
- Bernardus "Ber" Groosjohan (1897–1971), Dutch footballer
- Bernardus IJzerdraat (1891–1941), Dutch resistance fighter in the Second World War
- Bernardus Petrus "Bernard" Leene (1903–1988), Dutch track cyclist and Resistance member
- Bernardus C.J. "Bernard" Lievegoed (1905–1990), Dutch medical doctor, psychiatrist and author
- Bernardus Marinus "Ben" Pon (1936–2019), Dutch motor racing driver
- Bernardus van Schijndel (1647–1709), Dutch genre painter
- Bernardus W.M. "Bert" van Sprang (1944–2015), Dutch astronomer
- Bernardus D. H. "Bernard Tellegen (1900–1990), Dutch electrical engineer and inventor
- Bernardus J.M. "Ben" Verwaayen (born 1952), Dutch businessman
- Bernardus J.M. "Ben" Zonneveld (born 1940), Dutch plant geneticist and botanist
- Bernardus J.W. "Bernard" Zweers (1854–1924), Dutch composer and music teacher

== See also ==
- 3266 Bernardus, a minor planet named after Andres Bernardus Muller, Dutch astronomer
