= Van Sprang =

van Sprang is a surname. Notable people with the surname include:

- Alan van Sprang (born 1971), Canadian actor
- Bert van Sprang (1944–2015), Dutch astronomer

== See also ==
- 3098 van Sprang, main-belt asteroid
