= JWG =

JWG may refer to:

- John Wayne Gacy (1942–1994), American serial killer
- FAA LID for Watonga Regional Airport in Blaine County, Oklahoma, USA
- Joint Working Group
- Jongerenwerkgroep, Dutch meteorology and astronomy youth division founded in 1967 by Bert van Sprang
