= Bernard of Compostella =

Bernard of Compostella is the name of two medieval Spanish ecclesiastical lawyers:

- Bernardus Compostellanus Antiquus (early thirteenth century)
- Bernardus Compostellanus Junior (mid-thirteenth century)
