= Compostela =

Compostela may refer to:

- Santiago de Compostela, Galicia, Spain
  - Archdiocese of Santiago de Compostela
  - Compostela (la), a certificate given to those who have walked the Camino de Santiago (Way of St James)
  - SD Compostela, Spanish football team based in Santiago de Compostela
  - University of Santiago de Compostela, public university founded in 1495
- Azua de Compostela, Azua, Dominican Republic
- Compostela de Indias, Nayarit, Mexico
- Compostela, Davao de Oro, a municipality in Davao Region, Philippines
- Compostela, Cebu, a municipality in Central Visayas, Philippines
- Compostela (album), a 2014 album by Canadian singer-songwriter Jenn Grant
- Compostela Valley, now called Davao de Oro, a province in Davao Region, Philippines

== See also ==
- Bernard of Compostella (disambiguation)
