= Colonial architecture in Padang =

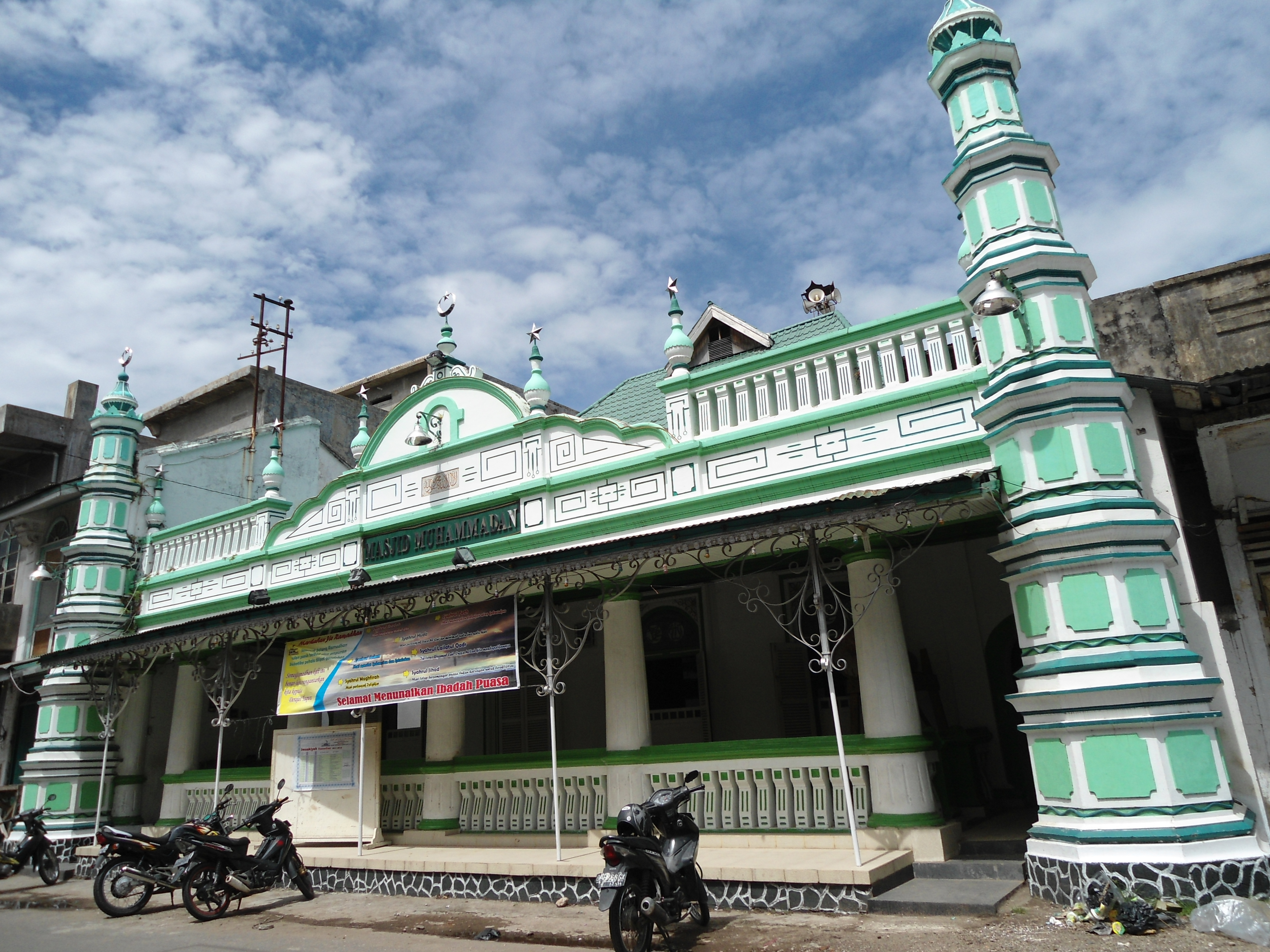
Masjid Muhammadan, a historic mosque in Padang

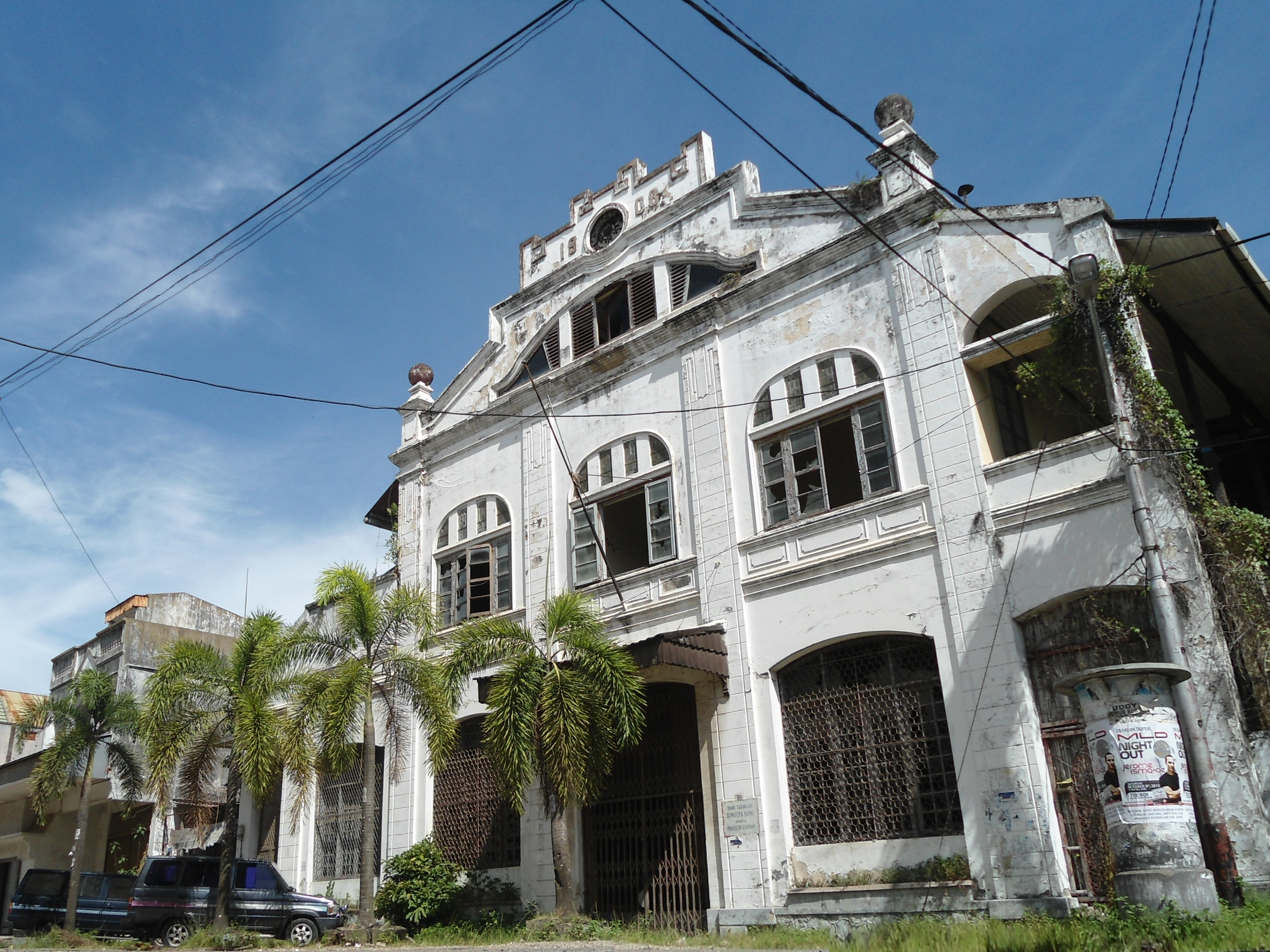
Old Town Padang

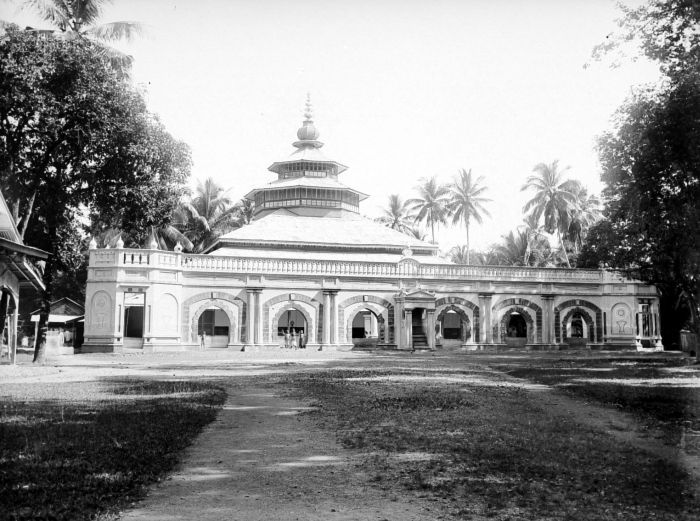
Ganting Grand Mosque before the installation of its minarets, c. 1900–1923

Colonial architecture in Padang, Sumatra, Indonesia, includes the Masjid Muhammadan. Padang has long been a trade center and was a center of pepper trade and gold mine from the 16th to 17th century . Trade extended to India, Portugal, United Kingdom and the Netherlands. In 1663 the city came under the Dutch authority (Dutch East Indies). The city was under British authority twice, during the war between United Kingdom and the Netherlands (1781-1784) and during the Napoleonic Wars (1795-1815). Afterwards the city was transferred back to the Netherlands. It came under control of Imperial Japan during World War II, and after the war control was eventually transferred to the independent Republic of Indonesia. Padang has also been a center for coffee, salt and textile trade. The book "Indische Bouwkunst" lists more than 2,000 projects built between 1900 and 1958 – many of which in Padang- , as well as over 150 architects who designed them. This book has been translated into Bahasa Indonesia and is available as a free download.

== Gallery ==
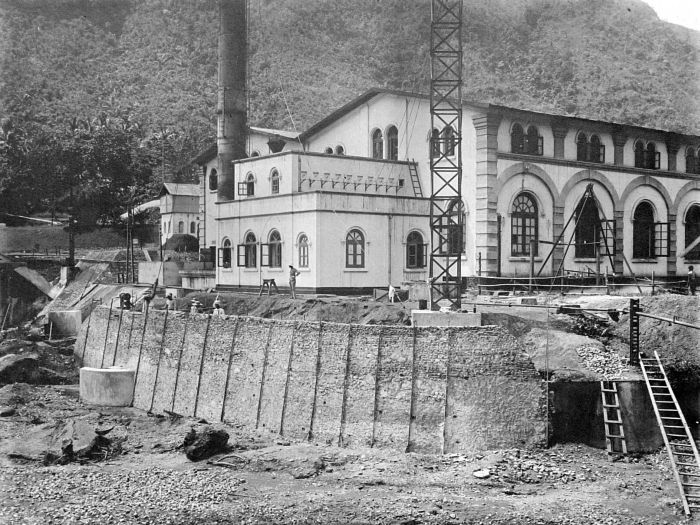
Electrical plant photographed in 1912

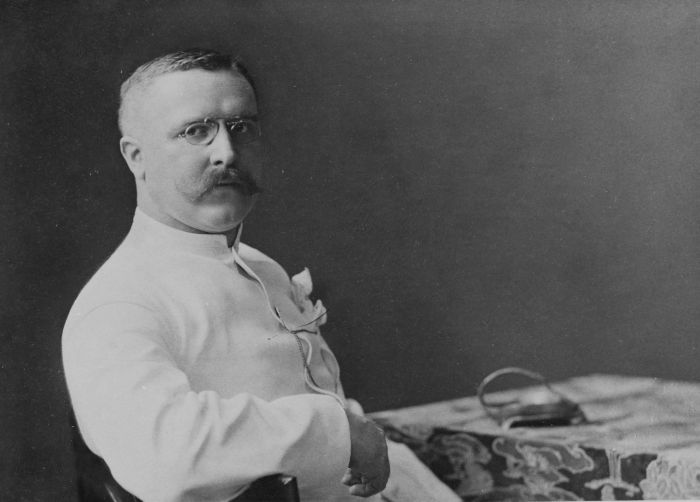
Padang Tobacco Company worker

== See also ==
- Colonial architecture in Indonesia
