= Colonial architecture of Makassar =

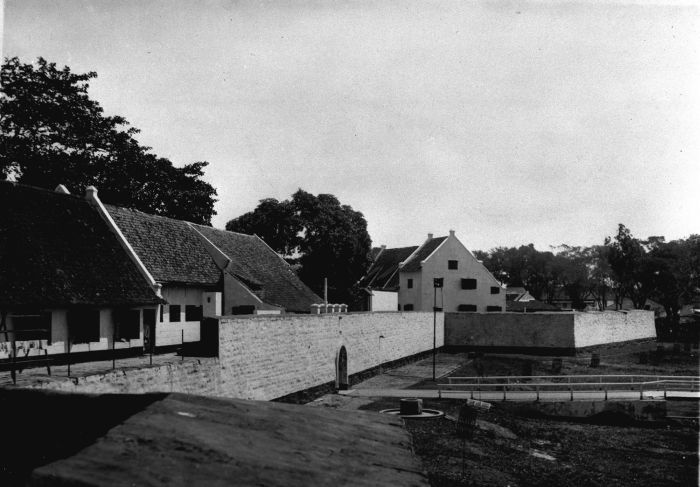
Fort Rotterdam, a notable colonial building in Makassar that still survives

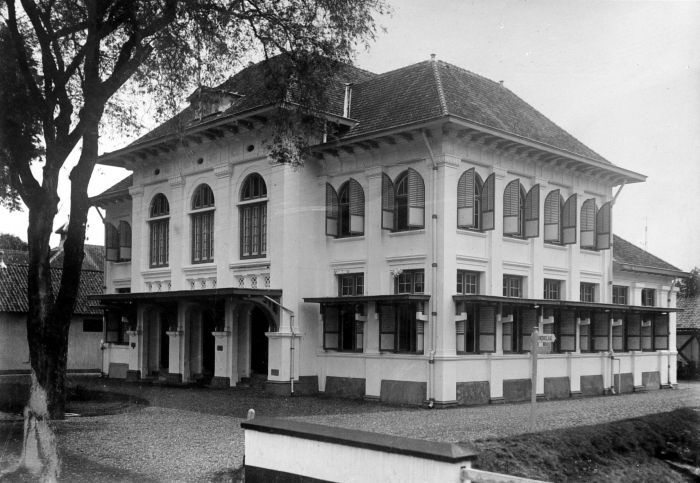
City Hall (Stadhuis) in the early 20th century

Colonial era architecture of Makassar in South Sulawesi, Indonesia includes Fort Rotterdam and other Dutch buildings constructed when the area was part for the Dutch East Indies. Most of the colonial era old towns had been demolished as a result of harbor expansions. As the gateway for Eastern province, the city was involved in the spice trade. Makassar eventually came under Dutch control in 1669. Harbor expansions made many buildings disappeared in Passarstreet, including the former Javasche Bank (Bank Indonesia) and the building of the Nederlandse Handelmaatschappij (Dutch Trading Company), both designed by the Amsterdam architect Eduard Cuypers (1858–1927) and Marius Hulswit (1862–1921), last worked from Batavia (Jakarta). Successors of both formed the architectural firm Fermont-Cuypers, with Theo Taen (1889–1970) as designer of the SMP Brother (1939) and the Stella Maris Hospital (1940). The book "Indische Bouwkunst" lists more than 2000 projects built between 1900 and 1958 – many of which in Makassar- , as well as over 150 architects who designed them. This book has been translated into Bahasa Indonesia and is available as a free download.

== Gallery ==
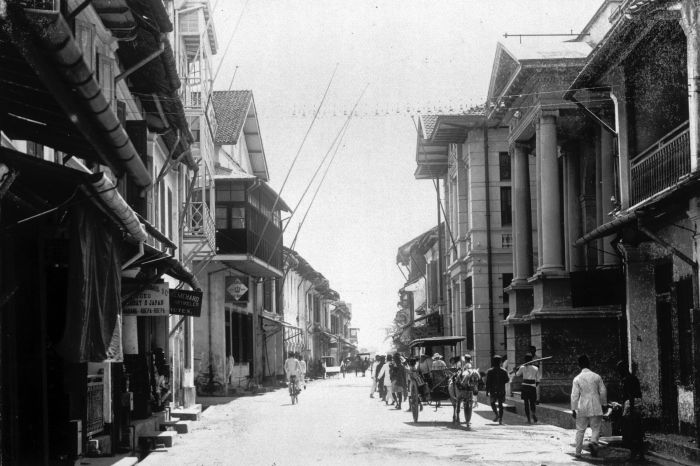
Market Street (De Passarstraat) in the early 20th century

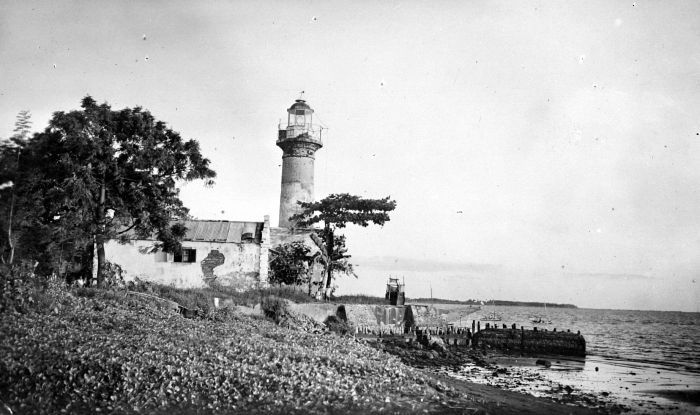
Fort Rotterdam lighthouse and Lannea grandis and Terminalia edulis trees (left and right respectively)

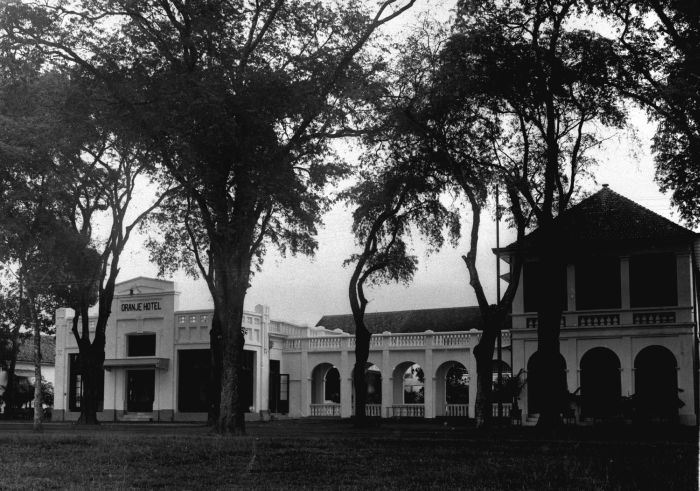
Orange hotel (Oranjehotel) in 1920s

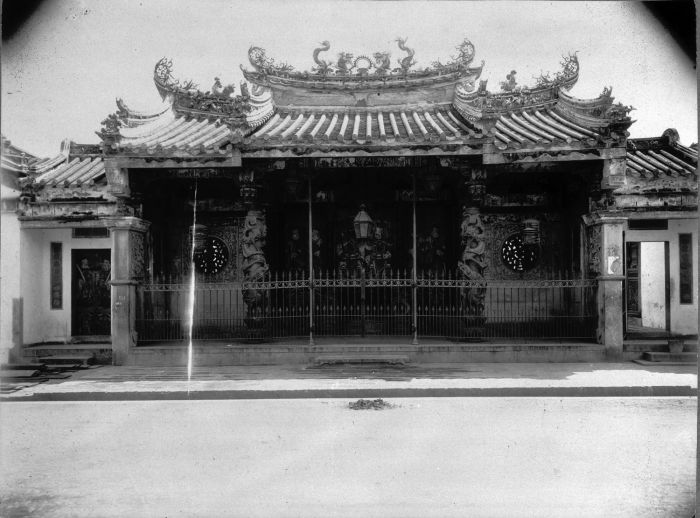
Chinese temple in Makassar

== See also ==
- Colonial architecture in Indonesia
