= Colonial architecture of Indonesia =

Dutch East Indies architectural style

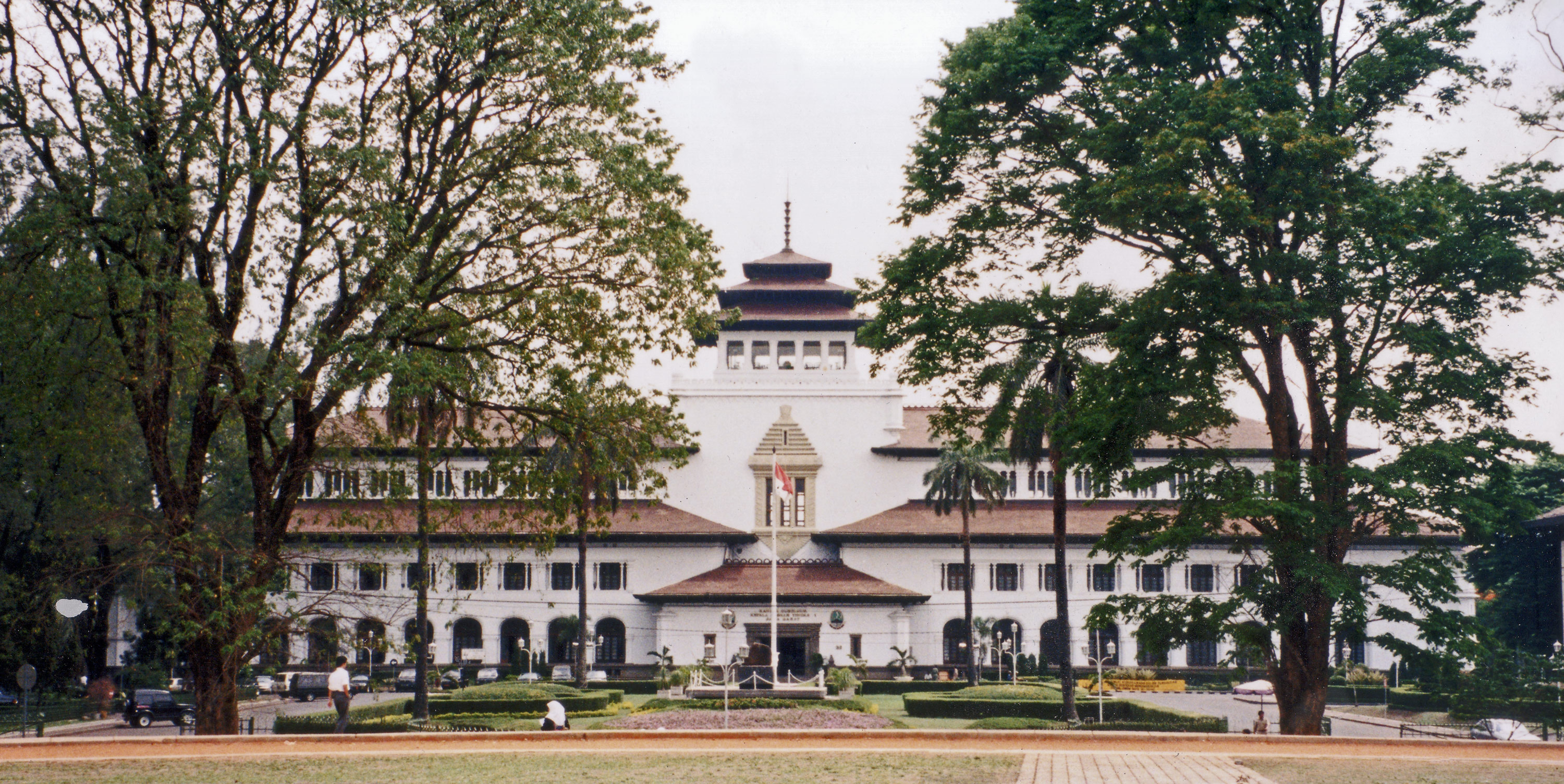
Gedung Sate in Bandung shows an attempt by colonial architects to achieve a distinctively Indonesian architectural style by fusing the local Sundanese, Western, and ancient Hindu-Buddhist architectures of Indonesia together.

The colonial architecture of Indonesia refers to the buildings that were created across Indonesia during the Dutch colonial period, during that time, this region was known as the Dutch East Indies. These types of colonial era structures are more prevalent in Java and Sumatra, as those islands were considered more economically significant during the Dutch imperial period. As a result of this, there is a large number of well preserved colonial era buildings that are still densely concentrated within Indonesian cities in Java and Sumatra to this day.

In the rest of the archipelago, there is also a sizeable amount of old Dutch East India Company (VOC) era forts and warehouses that were built during the Dutch colonial period of Indonesia, particularly around the Maluku Islands and Sulawesi, though these tend to be more scattered about and in less dense concentrations compared to those found on Java and Sumatra.

The three styles of colonial architecture in Indonesia are:

- Old Indies Style
- Indies Empire style
- New Indies Style

== Early architecture: replicating the mother country ==
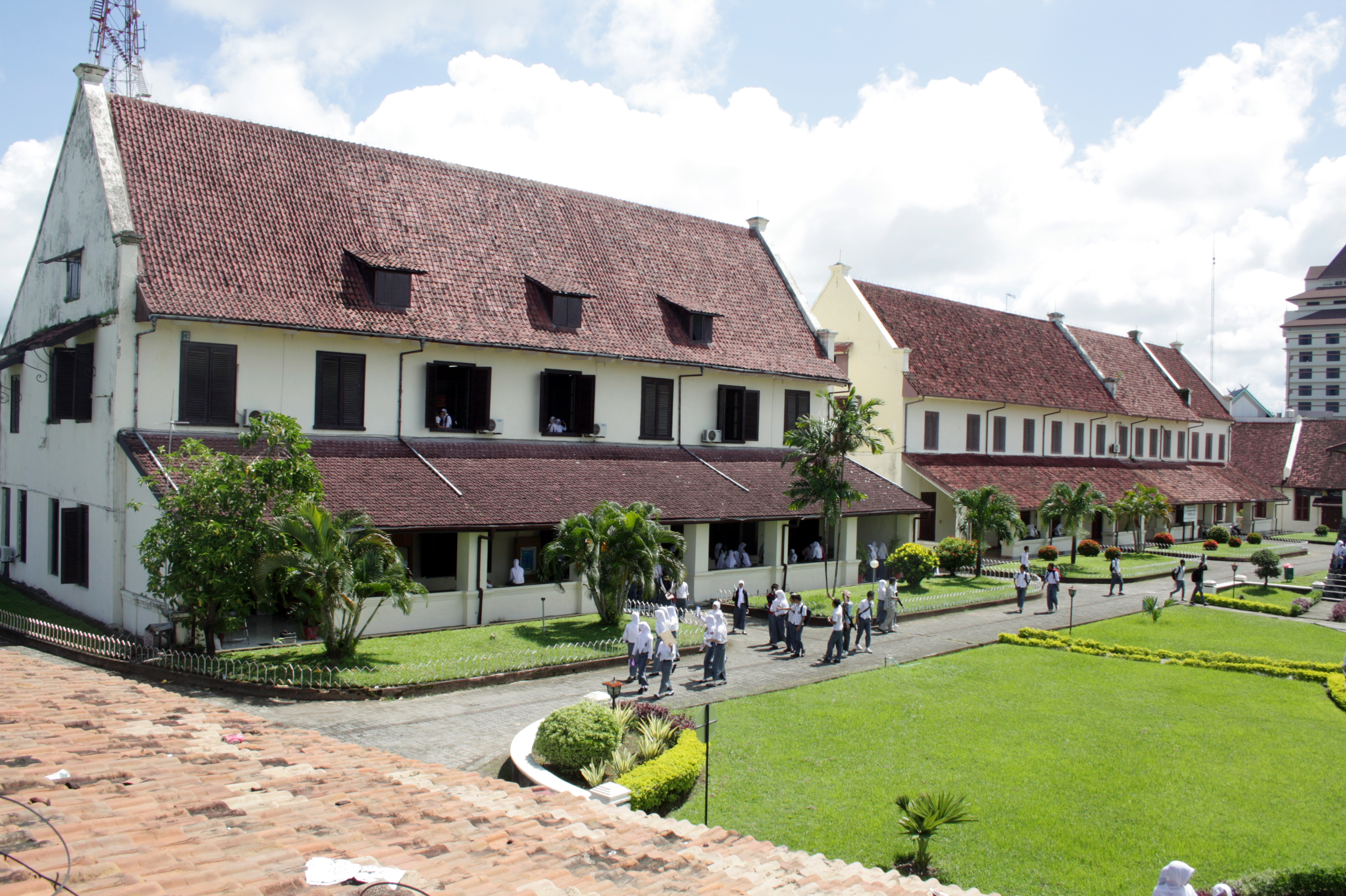
Fort Rotterdam in Makassar a typical Dutch fort of the 17th century.

Upon arriving in the East Indies, the Dutch's architecture were mainly derived from knowledge and workmanship of the home country. On most cases masonry were favored for much of their construction. Previously timber and its by-products had been almost exclusively used in the Indies, with the exception of some major religious and palace architecture. During the early period of colonization the Dutch colonies were mainly ruled by the VOC, who were mainly concerned with functionality of its construction rather than making structure as prestigious display.

One of the first major Dutch settlements was Batavia (later Jakarta) which in the 17th and 18th centuries was a fortified brick and masonry city built on a low lying terrain. The Dutch settlements in the 17th century were generally intra-muros, within walled defences to protect them from attack by other European trade rivals and native revolt. The fort was both a military base and a center of commerce and administration. The city was laid out into a grid with blocks that are divided by canals, complete with a Town Hall and Churches, just like any Dutch city would have been at the time. The houses within Batavia are described as being "fairly tall with a narrow façade and plastered walls inset with crossbar windows provided with rattan wickerwork for ventilation". And as in the Netherlands they were mainly terraced houses with small courtyard. Similar behavior of town planning and architecture can be noted in the development of the VOC port of Semarang in the 18th century.

For almost two centuries, the colonists did little to adapt their European architectural habits to the tropical climate. In Batavia, for example, they constructed canals through its low-lying terrain, which were fronted by small-windowed and poorly ventilated row houses, mostly in a Chinese–Dutch hybrid style. The canals became dumping grounds for noxious waste and sewage and an ideal breeding ground for the anopheles mosquitos, with malaria and dysentery becoming rife throughout the Dutch East Indies colonial capital. And by the second half of the 17th century people inside walled Batavia started to build their large countryside estates and villas alongside the Molenvliet Canal, the best examples to survive are former mansion of Reyner de Klerk which was built in rigid European style.

=== Chinese Influence ===
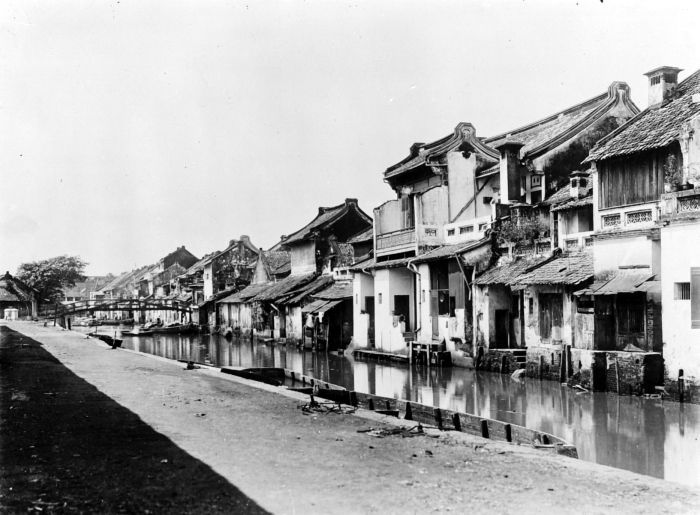
Pintoe Ketjil's Chinese shophouses along Ciliwung River.

Both VOC and later Dutch government encourage Chinese immigration to their colonies in the East Indies, these Chinese were brought as laborers and many of them ended up as a contractors during the early development of Batavia. In fact at the early 18th century Batavia had been described as a "Chinese city", and they had dominated the trade and economic sector of many VOC outposts around the East Indies. Many of the main colonial cities have large number of Chinese shophouses, which incorporated elements of the Chinese, Dutch and as well as Indigenous, particularly in the ventilation system. Unfortunately many example of these Chinese dwellings have been largely demolished in favor of cheap modern small offices. Parts of Surabaya, Medan, Tangerang and Semarang still has few examples around the Chinatown area. The most eminent example is Tjong A Fie Mansion in Medan, built in the year 1900 by a rich Chinese businessman Tjong A Fie; and also Candranaya Building in Jakarta which was built in 1807 by a Kapitan China. The Chinese also had built their ancestral temples in many cities, mainly in the historic Chinese quarters across the country and in imposingly Chinese style. The oldest temple to have survived is Kim Tek Ie in Glodok which dates back to 1650.

=== Early adaptation to the local environment ===
Although row houses, canals and enclosed solid walls were first thought as protection against tropical diseases coming from tropical air, years later the Dutch learnt to adapt their architectural style with local building features (long eaves, verandahs, porticos, large windows and ventilation openings). The Dutch Indies country houses of the middle 18th century were among the first colonial buildings to incorporate Indonesian architectural elements and attempt adapting to the climate. The basic form, such as the longitudinal organisation of spaces and use of joglo and limasan roof structures, was Javanese, but it incorporated European decorative elements such as neo-classical columns around deep verandahs. The style is known as Indies Style.

== 19th century ==
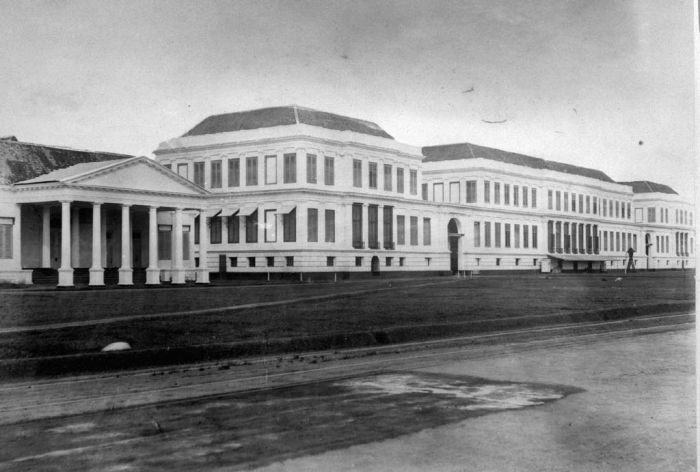
The Palace of Daendels, completed in 1828 (now A.A. Maramis Building)

At the end of the 19th century, great changes were happening across much of colonial Indonesia, particularly Java. The VOC had gone into bankruptcy and its possession were acquired by the Crown of the Netherlands. Economic reform were started by the French-pro Governor General Daendels, who were appointed in Java to manage the deteriorating VOC outposts. Daendels popularized the French neoclassic Empire Style in the Indies, which later became known as Indies Empire style. Daendels quit the by then already dilapidated castle of Batavia and expanded a suburb on the satellite town of Weltevreden in the south. Due to trade blockade by the English there was difficulties in gaining building materials, and thus majority of the old fortification of Old Batavia were dismantled to build public buildings of the 19th century style in Batavia. Similarly all the outpost on the outer islands beyond Java have experienced similar trend of architecture style, however very few of these buildings manage to survive.

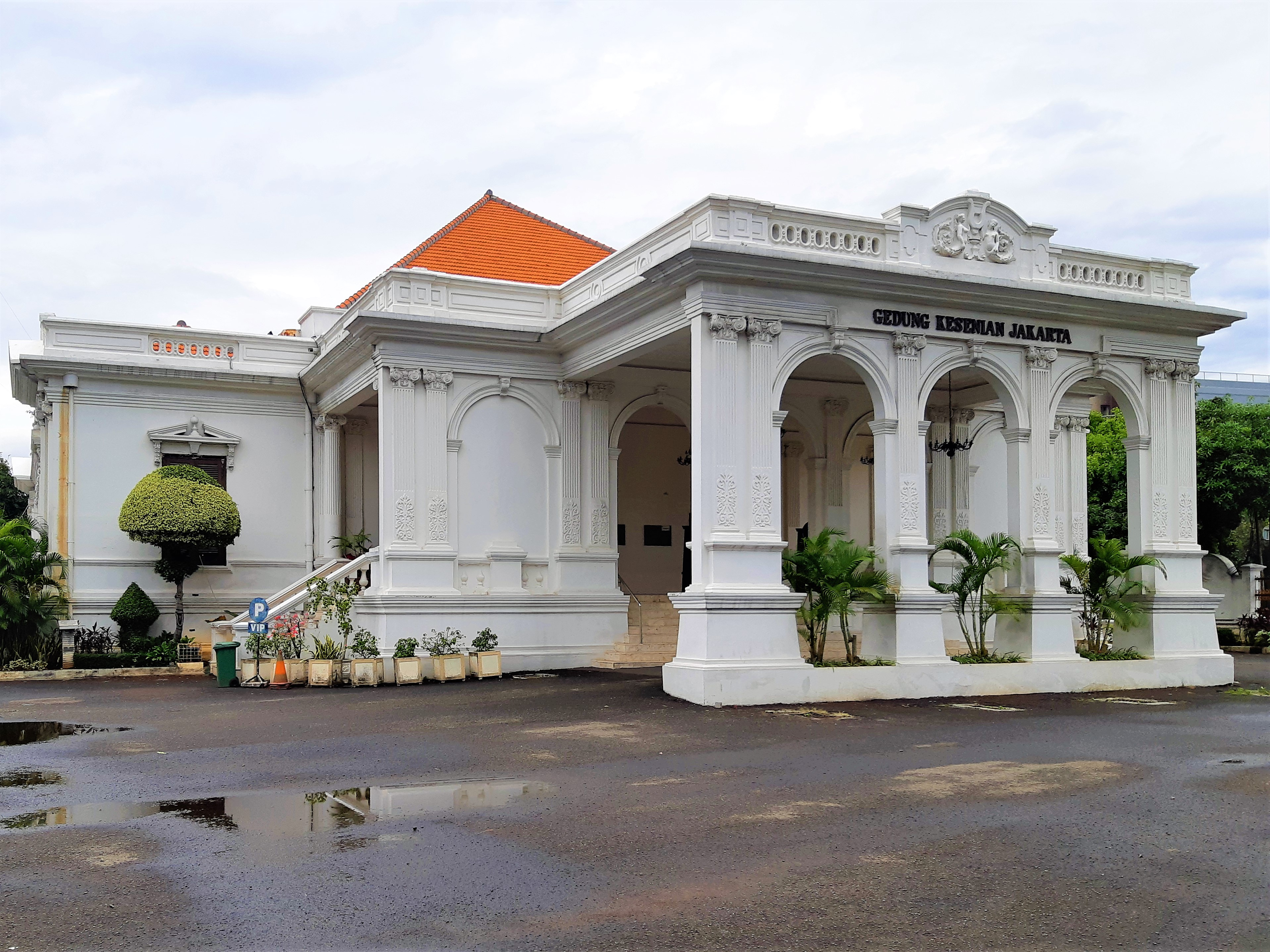
Jakarta Art Building (formerly Batavia Schouwburg)

In the late 19th century the taste for architecture in Europe have begun shifting to Neo Gothic and Neo Renaissance, the colony however didn't experience a boom in this style of architecture until later period. It was in this period also that the number of growing appreciation of indigenous architectural forms; Tawang railway station (1864) in Semarang features example of a harmonious assimilation of eastern and western ideas. In 1869 Suez Canal have been opened which had increased the volume of ships travelling from Europe to the East, new ports such as Tanjung Priok and Tanjung Perak were built to accommodate the increasing arriving ships. And it was also around the same period that Dutch Ethical Policy were implemented for the native of Dutch East Indies resulting several construction boom in cities. Near the end of the 19th century, a major civic building the Jakarta Cathedral was built in Neo-Gothic style, and on later period several Catholic churches; such as Surabaya's Kepanjen Church and Malang's Ijen Church, are also built in similar manner. However Neo Gothic remained stranger in the tropical setting of the Indies and were not as implemented as in British Raj. While Neo Renaissance can be seen in several buildings such as Blenduk Church of Semarang.

== 20th century ==
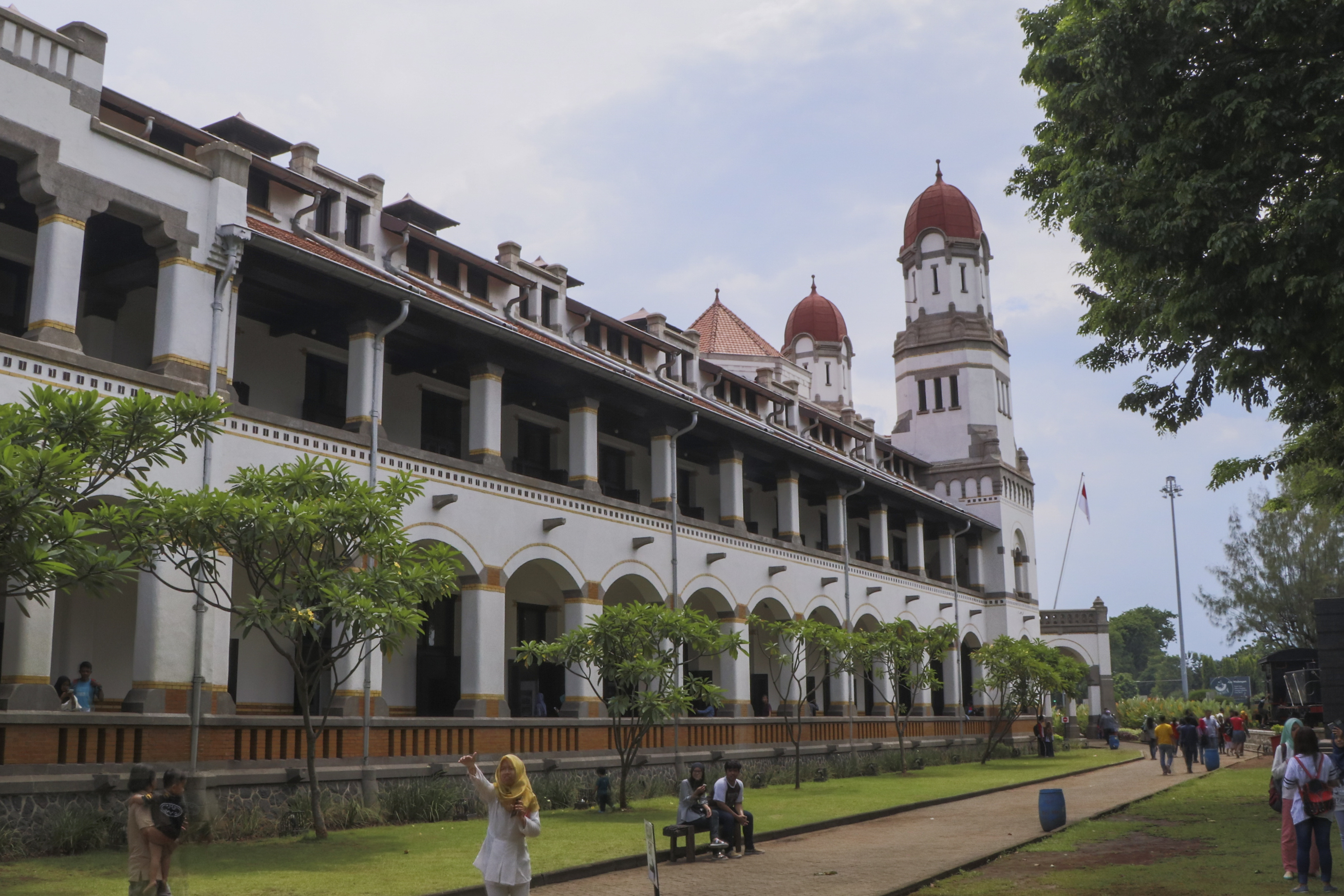
Lawang Sewu, an example of New Indies Style architecture

At the turn of the 20th century there was further significant changes in the colony. The Dutch by this period had managed to control most of the present-day Indonesian border. The Dutch had also implemented the Dutch Ethical Policy that encouraged both entrepreneurial opportunities for Europeans and flow of foreign investment. There was also increasing interest in exploiting Indonesia's wealth in oil and gas, leading capitalists to further set an eye on the archipelago and the Dutch to upgrade its infrastructures. Significant improvements to technology, communications and transportation had brought new wealth to Java's cities and private enterprise was reaching the countryside. The architectural trend of the colony followed the Metropolis' status both in economic health and popularized style. At the early 20th century, most of the buildings in the colony were built in Neo Renaissance style of Europe which was already popularized in the Netherlands by Pierre Cuypers. His nephew Eduard Cuypers visited the Indies in 1909 and designed from Amsterdam in collaboration with his branch in Batavia several magnificent offices for De Javasche Bank across the country. Eduard Cuypers would also establish largest architectural agency in the East Indies, till 1927 called Hulswit-Fermont, Batavia and Ed. Cuypers, Amsterdam. After the death of Eduard Cuypers, the office was called Fermont-Cuypers and designed more than a hundred buildings until 1957 across the country. Other prominent architect such as Berlage designed two buildings strictly in Dutch style such as the Algemene Insurance company in Surabaya and a building in Batavia. Cosman Citroen also had designed Lawang Sewu in strikingly European appearance.

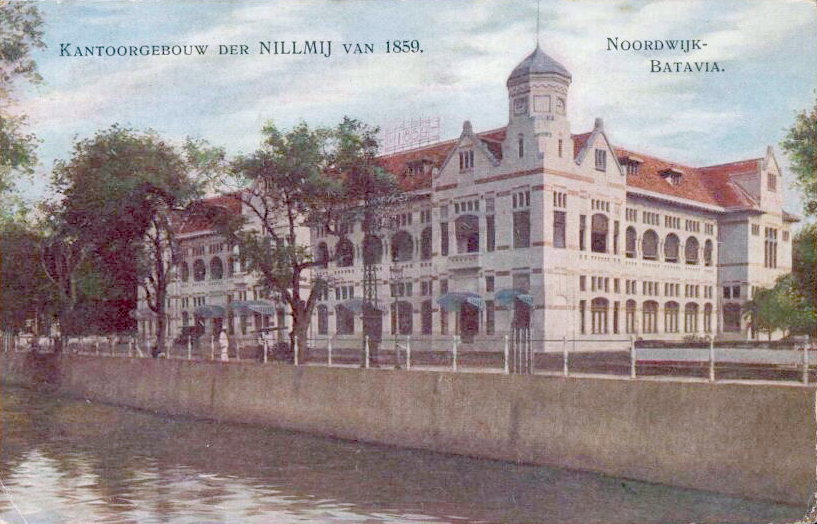
Moojen's NILLMIJ in Batavia, 1912 (now Jiwasraya Building)

However, by the 1920s, the architectural taste have begun to shift in favor of Rationalism and Modernist movement, particularly there was increasing Art Deco architecture design influenced by Berlage. In the first three decades of the 20th century, the Public Works Department rolled out major public building and city planning programs. The key designer was T. Karsten, who developed his predecessors' ideas for incorporating indigenous Indonesian elements into rational European forms. Bandung, which once was described as a "laboratory", is of particular note with one of the largest remaining collections of 1920s Art-Deco buildings in the world, with the notable work of several Dutch architects and planners, including Albert Aalbers, Thomas Karsten, Henri Maclaine Pont, J. Gerber, and C.P.W. Schoemaker. A large number of train stations, business hotels, factories and office blocks, hospitals and education institutions were built in this period. With economic growth and increasing European migration to the colony, there was increasing middle class population and urbanization from the countryside. To accommodate this growth several modern Garden Suburb were built across the cities of the Indies such as P.A.J. Moojen's Menteng in Jakarta, T. Karsten's New Candi Suburb in Semarang, and most of North Bandung.

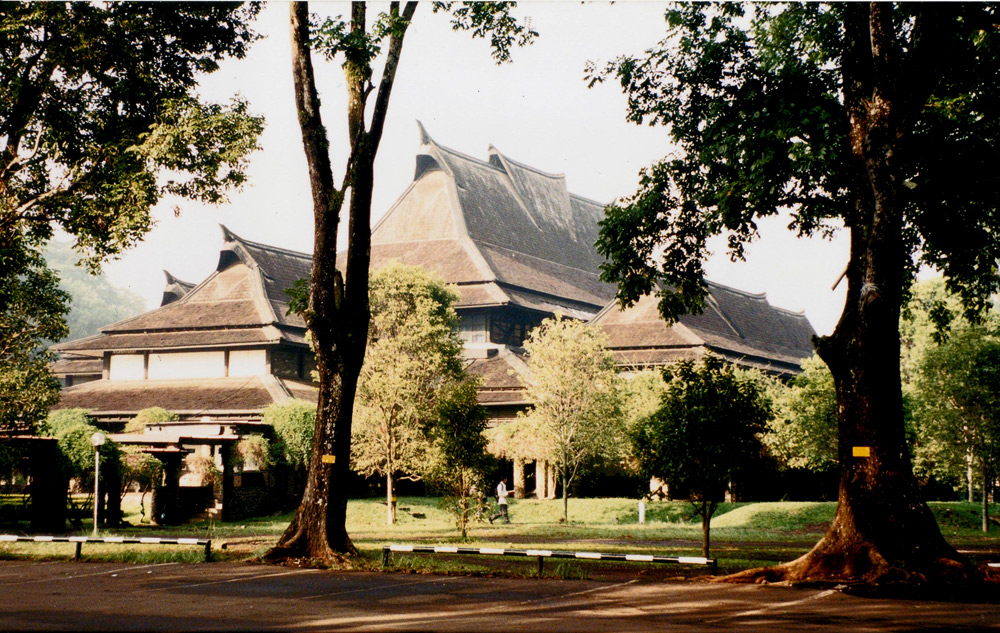
Ceremonial Hall, Bandung Institute of Technology, Bandung, by architect Henri Maclaine-Pont.

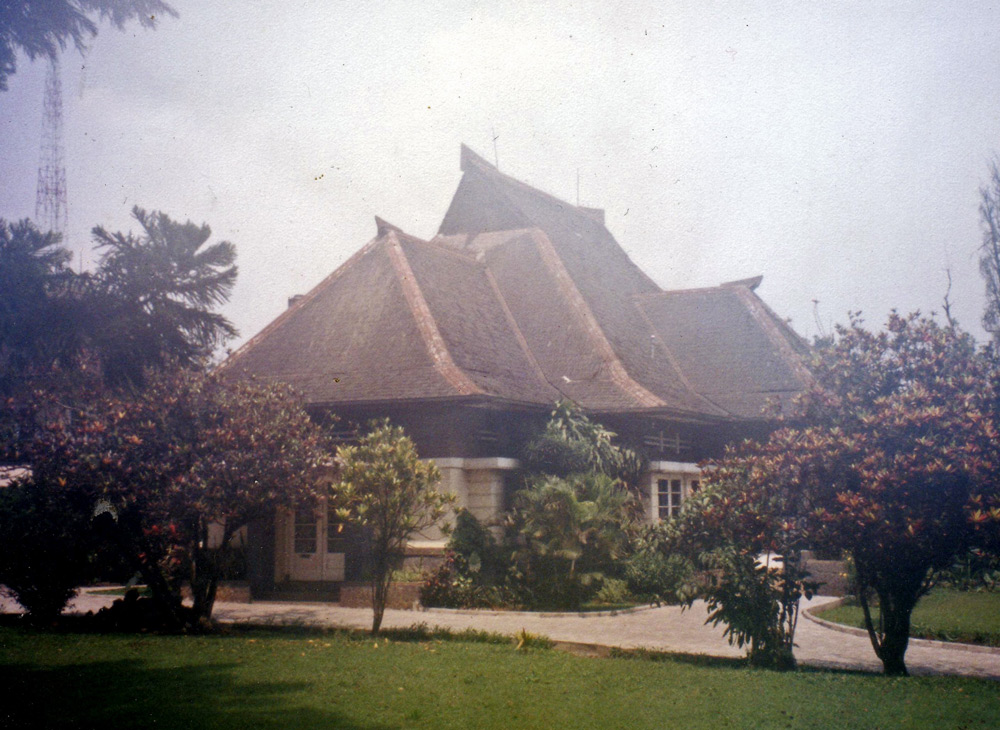
This pre-war Bandung home is an example of 20th century Indonesian Dutch Colonial styles

Various Dutch architects also made the Indies their architectural and engineering playground. This resulted to the introduction of 'Dutch architecture styles' such as Nieuwe Zakelijkheid, De Stijl and Amsterdam School. But most architects were during first half of the 20th century more open to other more global stylistic influences as Beaux-arts, Art deco, Expressionism, etc., than their colleagues in the Netherlands.. Most of which had survived and can be observed in design for colonial period offices, churches, public buildings and villas. Perhaps the highest form of "enlightenment" can be seen in Villa Isola, designed by Schoemaker in Bandung. Several architect such as C.P.W. Schoemaker and H.M. Pont also made an attempt on modernizing the indigenous architecture of Indonesia, by incorporating it with western modernity, paving the way for the creation of vernacular New Indies Style. The development of this architecture trend paralleled the growth of Delft School of the Netherlands. Bandung Institute of Technology, Pasar Gede of Solo and Pohsarang Church in Kediri are clear example of this experiment.

The attempt of conforming with the local architecture had already begun since the early VOC period as appeared in the Indies Style. The differences is whereas the Indies Style country houses were essentially Indonesian houses with European trim, by the early 20th century, the trend was for modernist influences—such as art-deco—being expressed in essentially European buildings with Indonesian trim (such as the pictured home's high-pitched roofs with Javan ridge details and often with more consideration for air ventilation). Practical measures carried over from the earlier Indies Style country houses, which responded to the Indonesian climate, included overhanging eaves, larger windows and ventilation in the walls.

== The outer islands ==
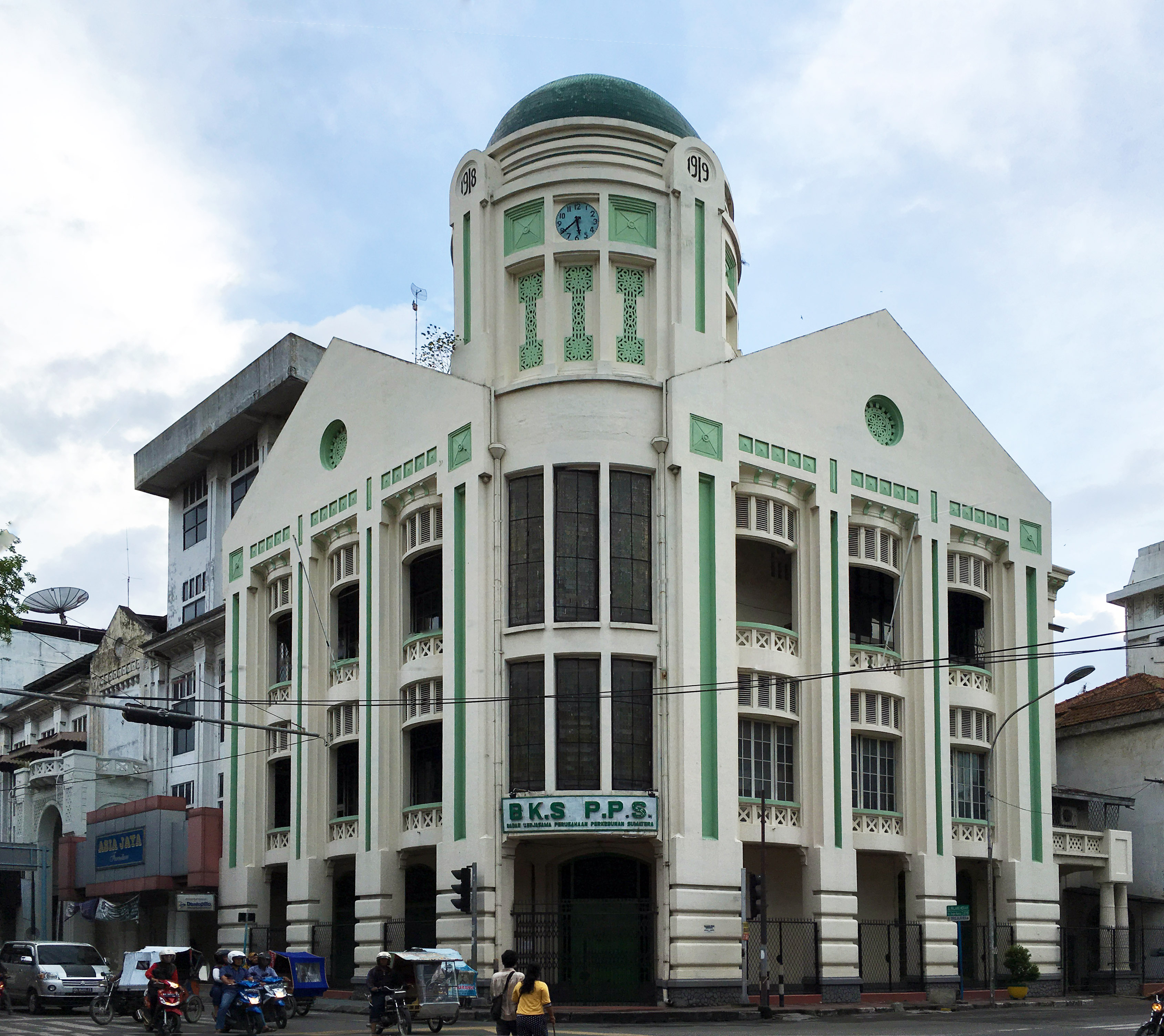
Art Deco in Medan appeared in the former building of AVROS, now the Sumatra Planters Association (BKS PPS).

There are plenty of colonial architecture and infrastructure that remain functional beyond Java. The island of Sumatra in particular benefited from its abundance of oil and tin, in comparison to Java's mostly plantation based economy. The best buildings are concentrated in West Sumatra, North Sumatra and Aceh. Medan was once known as "Parijs van Sumatra" and have a large number of Art Deco colonial offices concentrated around Kesawan Square. For the European and upper class local population the Dutch had planned and built the Garden Suburb of Polonia. Moorish Revival architecture also paved their way to Sumatra's Mosque design. The Maimun Palace and Great Mosque of Medan are beautiful example of the movement. There are large concentration of colonial offices, public buildings and villas in the city of Padang, Sawahlunto, Bukittingi and Banda Aceh, all of which was major economic cities in colonial Sumatra. Other parts of Sumatra also include Bangka-Belitung Islands Regency (a major source of Tin), and the pepper port of Bengkulu.

In Makassar, which once was considered the gateway for Eastern province, has several fine colonial era buildings. The best surviving example of colonial buildings is Fort Rotterdam, followed by the old Cityhall, Court of Justice and Harmonie Society building that now function as an art gallery. Large scale demolition of colonial era old town took place in Makassar as a result of its harbor expansion.

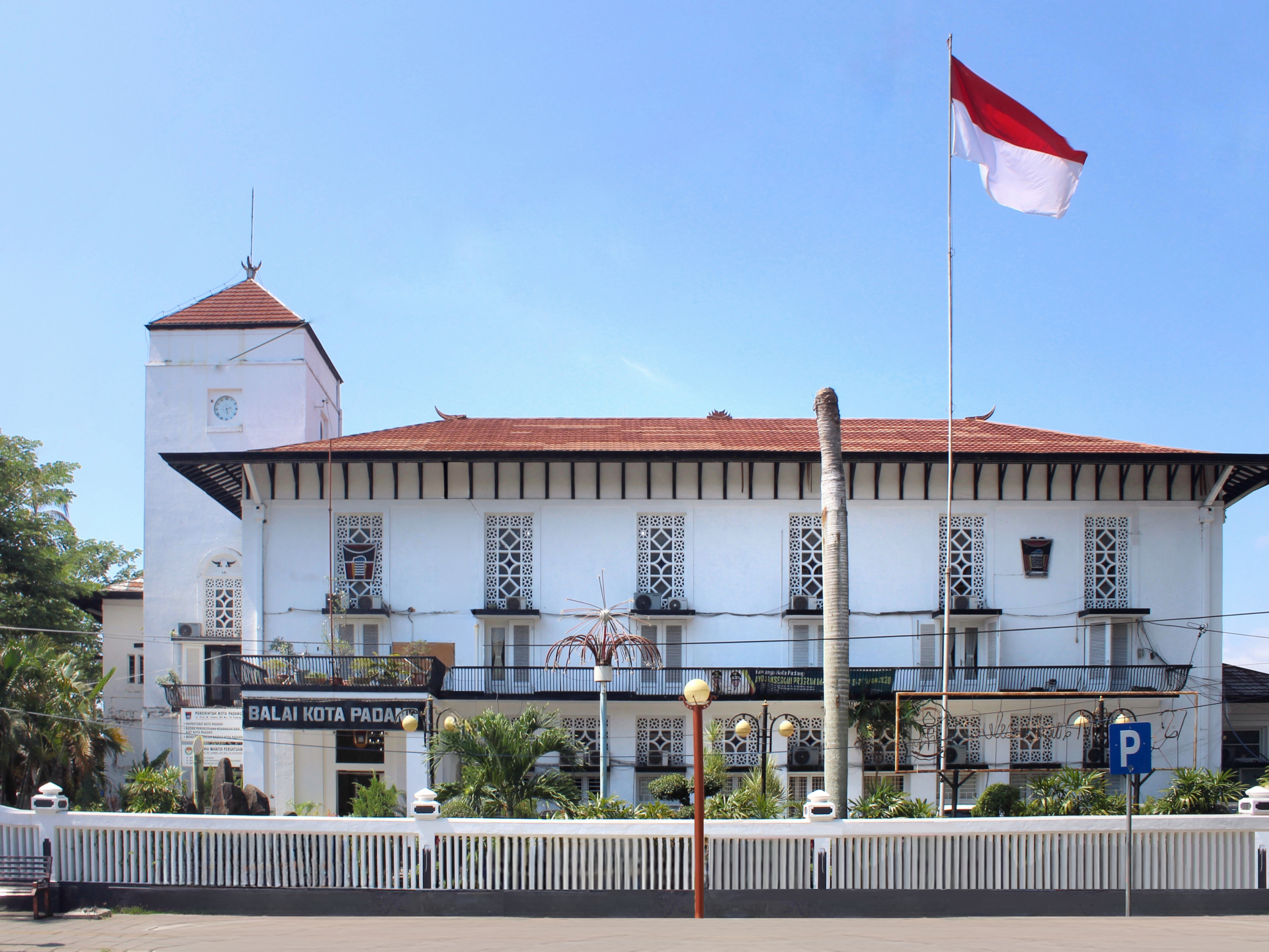
Padang City Hall, Padang

Colonial rule was never as extensive on the island of Bali as it was on Java— it was only in 1906, for example, that the Dutch gained full control of the island—and consequently the island only has a limited stock of colonial architecture. Singaraja, the island's former colonial capital and port, has a number of art-deco kantor style homes, tree-lined streets and dilapidated warehouses. The hill town of Munduk, a town amongst plantations established by the Dutch, is Bali's only other significant group of colonial architecture; a number of mini mansions in the Balinese-Dutch style still survive.

There are numerous forts built by European powers across the archipelago, but the highest concentration are located around the Maluku Islands. Most are built the early colonial era to protect Dutch interest in the spice trade. There is particularly a high concentration of colonial buildings in Banda Neira, Saparua, and Nusa Laut, with several 17–18th century churches and fortification. Ambon City was once renowned for its "colonial charm" and stock of Dutch buildings; however, the city was largely destroyed during World War II.

== In independent Indonesia ==
The lack of development due to the Great Depression, the turmoil of the Second World War and Indonesia's independence struggle of the 1940s, and economic stagnation during the politically turbulent 1950s and 60s, meant that much colonial architecture has been preserved through to recent decades. Although colonial homes were almost always the preserve of the wealthy Dutch, Indonesian and Chinese elites, and such buildings in general are unavoidably linked with European colonialism, the styles were often rich and creative combinations of two cultures, so much so that the homes remain sought after into the 21st century. Native architecture was arguably more influenced by the new European ideas than colonial architecture was influenced by Indonesian styles; and these Western elements continue to be a dominant influence on Indonesia's built environment today.

== Examples ==
Below are list of articles featuring Dutch colonial architecture across Indonesia.

- Bandung
  - List of colonial buildings in Bandung
- Bogor
  - Architecture of Bogor
- Cirebon
  - Cirebon City Hall
  - Cirebon railway station
- Jakarta
  - Colonial architecture in Jakarta
- Makassar
  - Colonial architecture in Makassar
- Medan
  - Colonial architecture in Medan
- Padang
  - Colonial era architecture in Padang
- Semarang
  - Dutch architecture in Semarang
- Surabaya
  - Colonial architecture of Surabaya

== See also ==
- Dutch colonial architecture
- Architecture of Indonesia
- Colonial architecture in Southeast Asia
- List of church buildings in Indonesia
- Rumah adat
- Landhuis
- Indies Empire style
- New Indies Style
- Malay houses
- Sino-Portuguese architecture
- Bahay kubo
- Bahay na bato

== Works cited ==
- Tjahjono, Gunawan, ed. (1998). Architecture. Indonesian Heritage. Vol. 6. Singapore: Archipelago Press. ISBN 9813018305.
- Norbruis, Obbe (2020). Landmarks from a bygone era, Life and work of Ed. Cuypers & Hulswit-Fermont 1897-1927. Volendam: LM Publishers. ISBN 9789460220128.
- Norbruis, Obbe (2020). Architecture from the Indonesian Past, Life and work of Fermont-Cuypers 1927-1957. Volendam: LM Publishers. ISBN 9789460220159.
- Norbruis, Obbe (2021). Indische Bouwkunst, architecten en hun oeuvre in Nederlands-Indië en Indonesië in de eerste helft van de 20ste eeuw. Volendam: LM Publishers. ISBN 9789460220296.
- Norbruis, Obbe (2021). Arsitektur di Nusantara. Para Arsitek dan Karya Mereka di Hindia-Belanda dan Indonesia pada Paruh Pertama Abad ke-20.
- Schoppert, P.; Damais, S. (1997). Java Style. Paris: Didier Millet. ISBN 9625932321.
