= B.J.K. Cramer =

Dutch architect

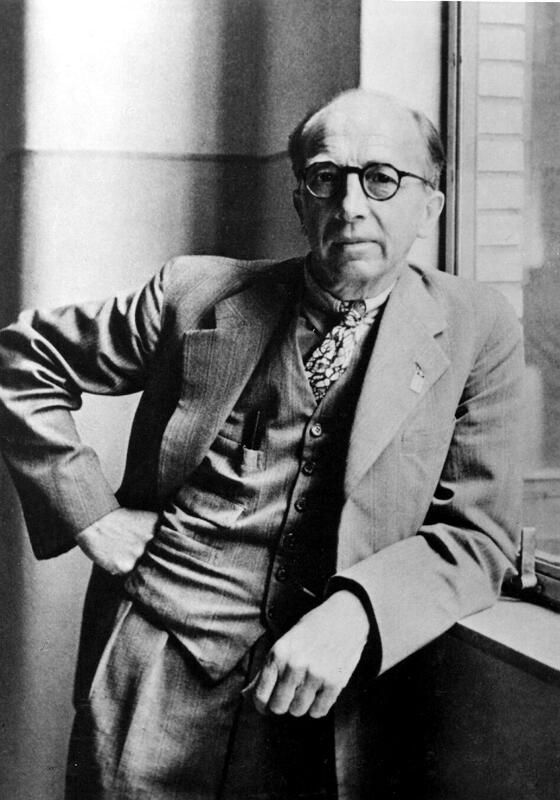
Portrait of B.J.K. Cramer

Bernardus Jozua Karel (Bernard Joshua Charles or B.J.K.) Cramer (Delft, 4 March 1890 - Zutphen, 19 December 1978) was a Dutch architect.

== Life and work ==
He worked in the Dutch East Indies from 1918 until approximately 1923 in Batavia, Dutch East Indies as part of the Civil Service Public Works (Batavia bij de Dienst Burgerlijke). He returned to the Netherlands in 1923 and founded his own architectural firm.

The renovation of the Weversend was one of his first projects in the Netherlands.

Jan Kruisheer (1925-2000), known for his hospital architecture, worked for Cramer beginning in 1954 and took over the firm after Cramer's retirement in 1959.

== Works ==
- Pasar Glodok, Pancoran-Jalan Pintu Besar Utara (Pantjoran-Binnen Nieuwpoortstraat), Batavia (now Jakarta) (1920)
- Pasar Gambir
- Missigit, Batavia
- Renovation of Weversend
- Gemeentelijk slacht- en koelhuis
- Engineers School at the William Buytewechstraat 45 by architects BJK Cramer and C. Elffers (1949)

== Gallery ==
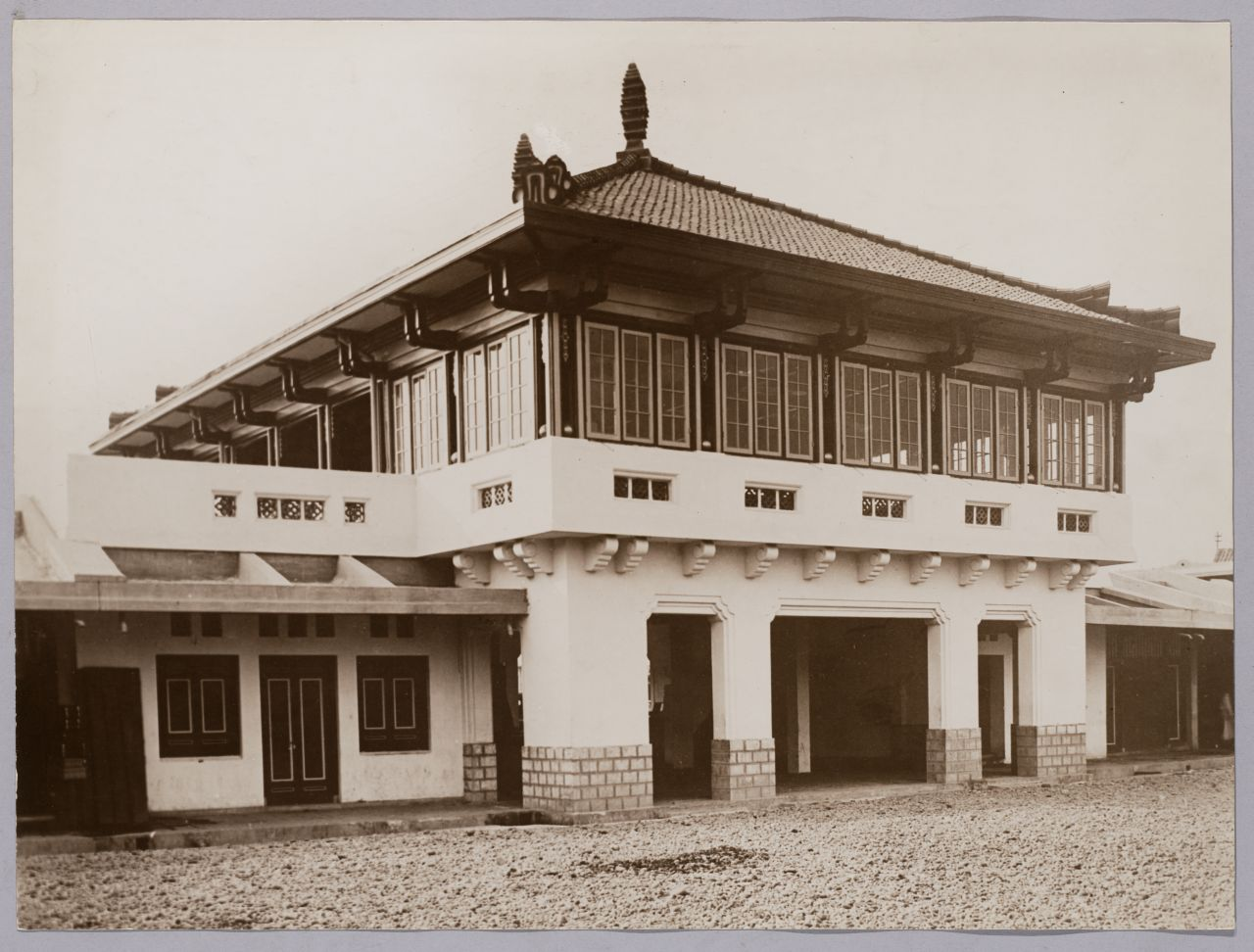
"Hoofdgebouew", Pasar Glodok Main Building, Batavia, Dutch East Indies

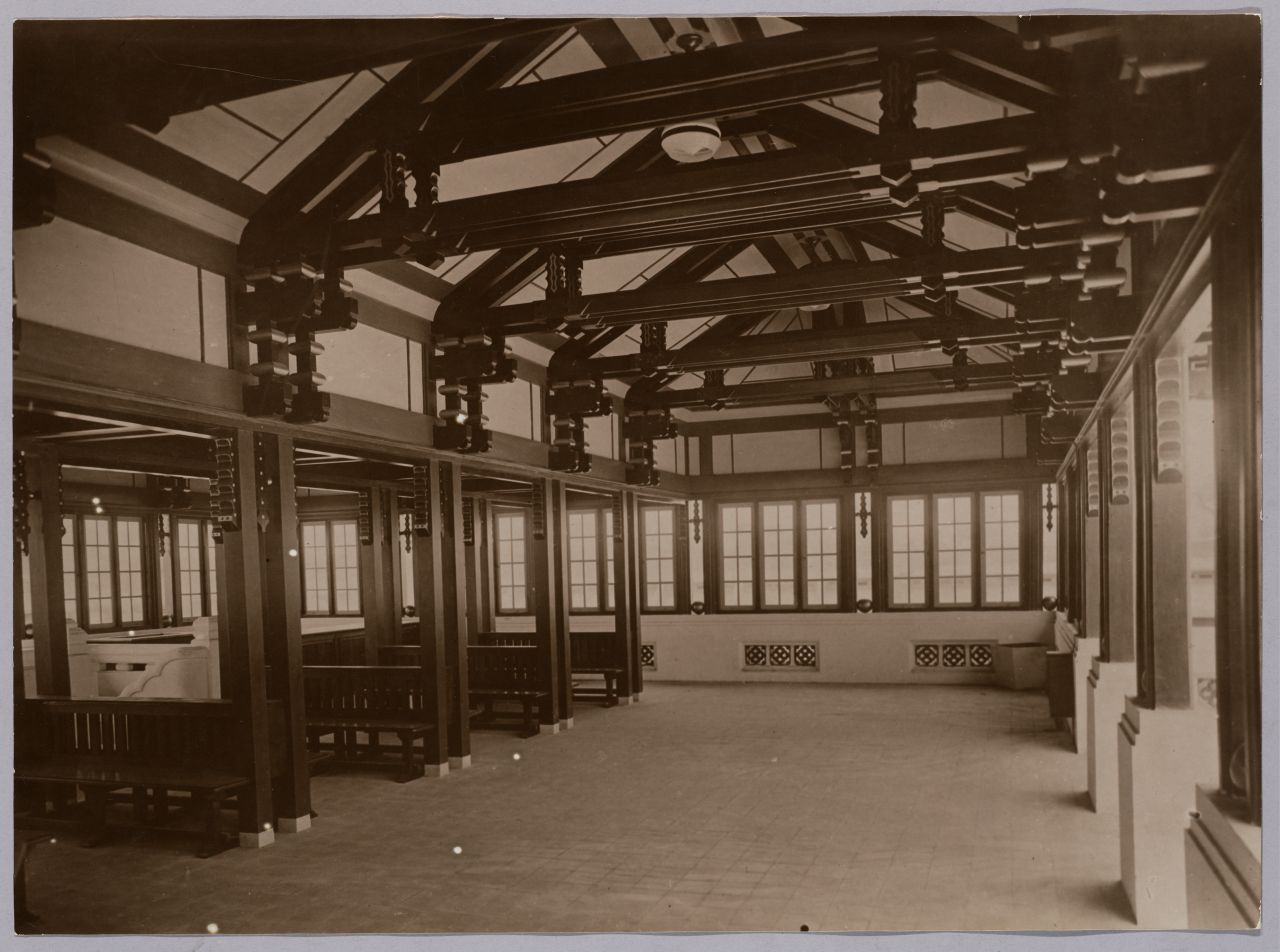
Pasar Glodok Main Building

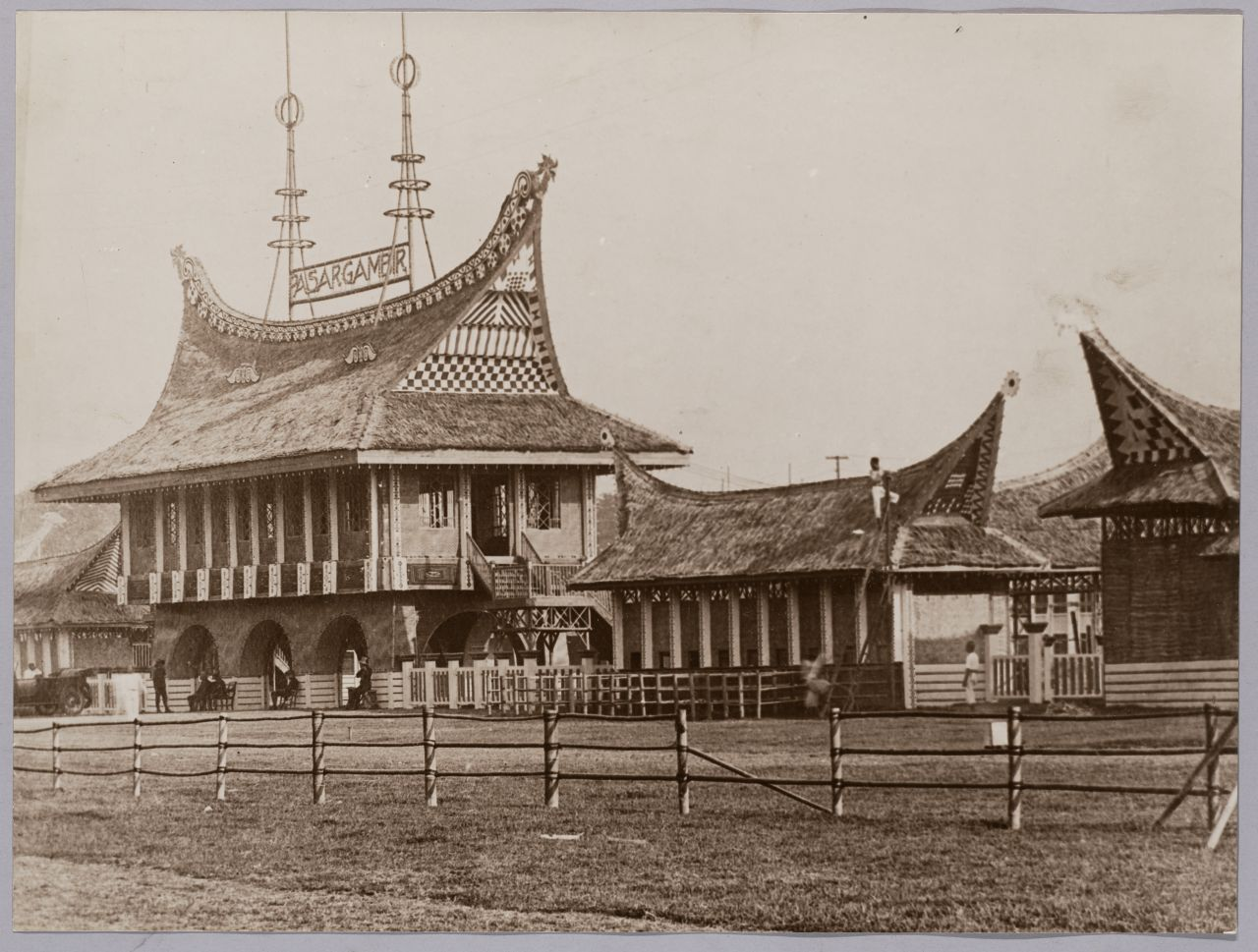
Pasar Gambir (Gambir Fair)

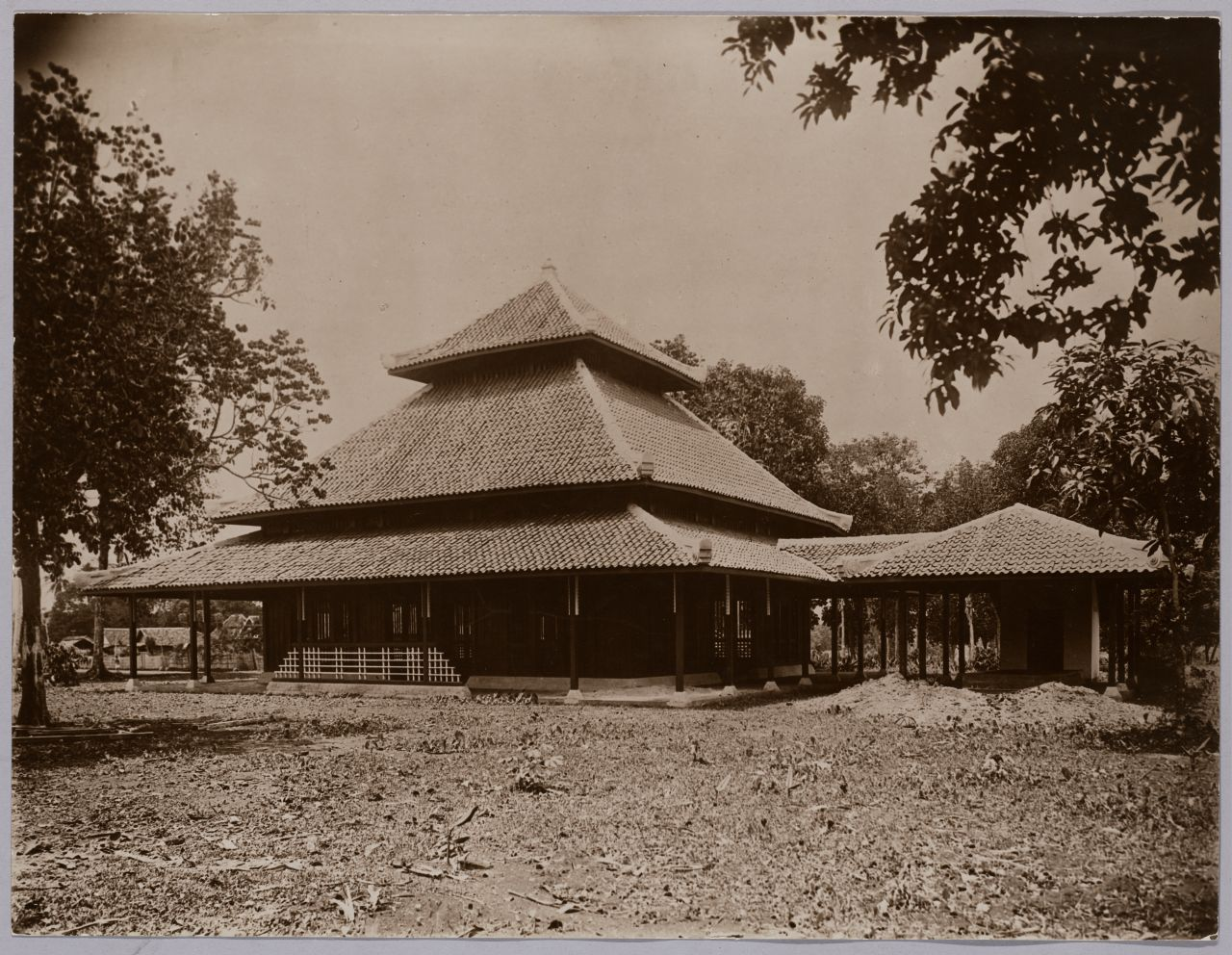
Missigit (mosque)

== See also ==
- Colonial architecture of Indonesia
- List of Indonesian architects
