= Colonial architecture of Southeast Asia =

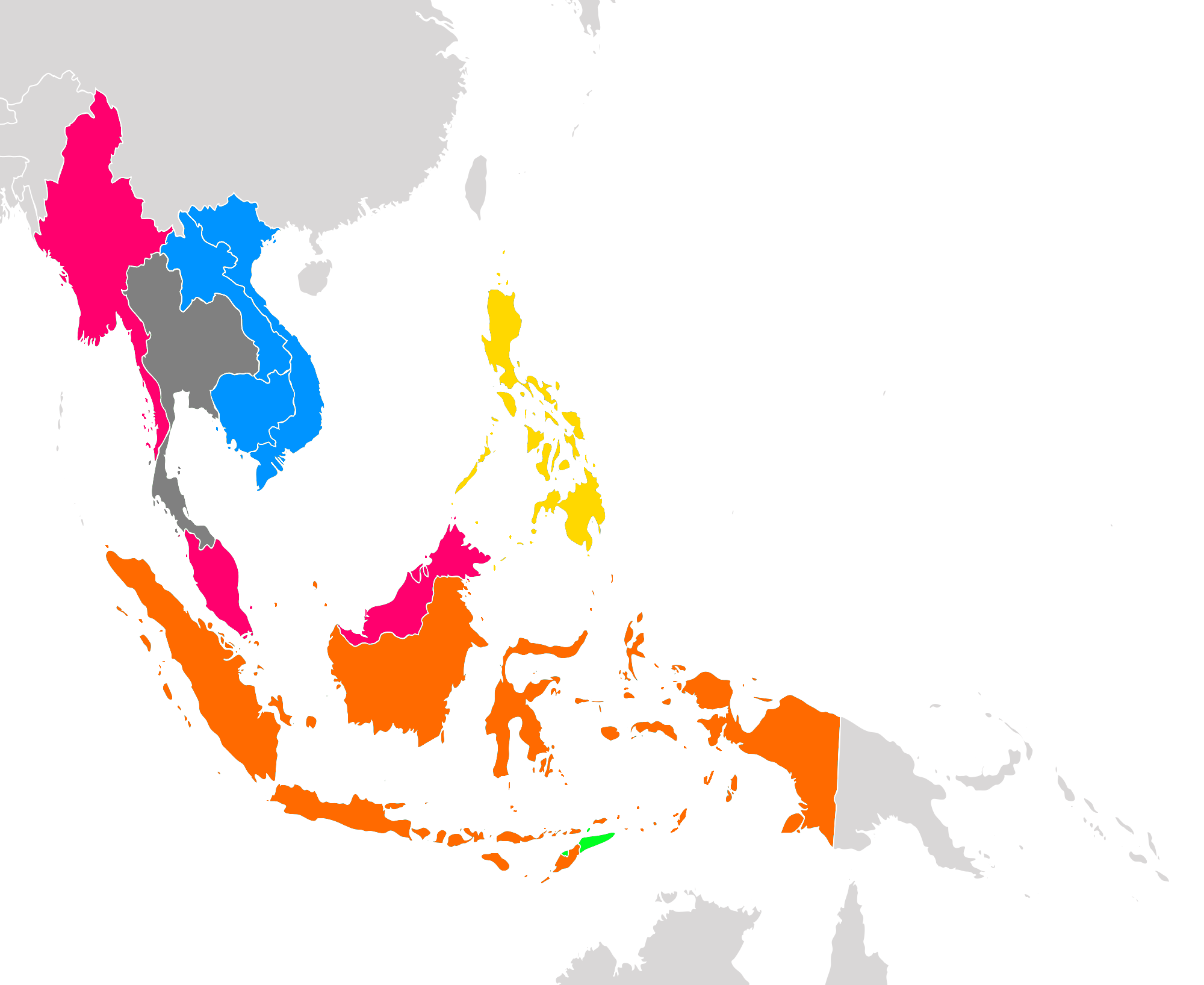
European colonisation of Southeast Asia French Indochina Dutch East Indies Portuguese Timor Spanish East Indies British Burma, Malaya and Borneo

During the 17th, 18th, and 19th century, European nations began to consolidate naval routes into South East Asia, whereby India was used as the main trade route for ships to stop and refuel or trade. Over this time, mostly during the 19th century, various Western Colonies began to gain influence various countries and construct colonial architecture in Southeast Asia. This period saw many classical buildings constructed in the neoclassical and French Colonial style of architecture.

== UNESCO World Heritage list ==
=== Luang Prabang in Laos ===
The ancient capital of Laos, Luang Prabang is a host of French Colonial buildings. Luang Prabang was listed in the UNESCO World Heritage Site for its "remarkably" well preserved architectural, cultural and religious heritage with a blend of urban developments over several centuries including the French Colonial influences. During the French Colonial period, there was a visible shift and transition of traditional residential buildings into French-style buildings within various areas in South East Asia. Whilst this transition was not completely transformative, French influence intentionally modified their buildings to embrace the tradition and culture of the previous history. As such, South East Asia now has a harmonious split between traditional and French colonial buildings. The 1887 ransack and pillage from the Black Flag Army, who were a Chinese Bandit group, encouraged the kingdom to accept receiving protection from the French. Soon after a commissariat was erected. In the early 20th century, the French Colonials has established many buildings and whilst somewhat preserving traditional architecture, the French Colonials had an evident influence on the city. They built a mansion for the résident-supérieur (governor) where the precedent royal palace was. They also established a courthouse, housing for civil servants, a prison, barracks for a small detachment and a hospital.

=== Hoi An in Vietnam ===
Hoi An reflects a combination of Chinese, Japanese, Vietnamese and later European influences that have created a diverse city with various architectural styles. Hoi An Ancient Town was listed as a National Cultural Heritage Site in 1985 and thus a Special National Cultural Heritage Site under the Cultural Heritage Law of 2001.

== French Colonial Style - houses ==
Although colonial architecture only had a limited influence in South East Asia, there was still a distinct style of housing found throughout, especially in areas located around Laos, Cambodia and Vietnam. Prior to French colonisation, cities consisted of ramshackle collections of bamboo or wooden stilted houses with thatched roofs, whereby the main cluster was around former palaces and temples. The French colonial architectural houses consisted of two-story brick and stucco villas. While incorporating some art deco decoration, they embodied wooden shuttered windows and pitched tile roofs. Comparatively the structures were thick walled and usually incorporated a verandah.

The French did not embody European design into their houses, however, they utilised styles such as Vietnam styles to better accommodate for the warmer climate. As such a new design emerged, combining traditional materials and designs with European technical innovations. This design became larger and the bottom floors of the two-story villas, which used to be used as a multi-purpose level, became increasingly used in private space due to European privacy, a stronger economy, and higher quality of living. Modern colonial houses also began to use columns with mortar material.

== Hanoi ==
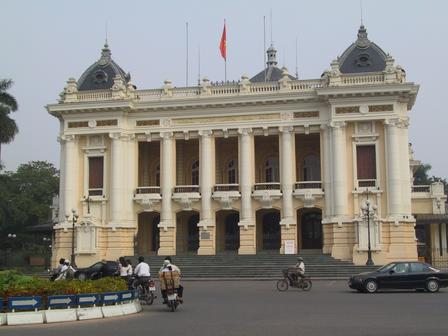
View from the front of Hanoi Opera House

In the late 19th century when the French occupied Hanoi, The French constructed French-Colonial style buildings over old Vietnamese housing and establishments. These establishments were imposing but vibrant French-style villas. The section of the town is regarded as the French Quarters, which is now known as Ba Dinh. The French Quarters are characterised by wide tree-lined streets. This area of Vietnam is a host of well established luxurious hotels and upmarket restaurants. For travellers, attractions such as the Hoa Lo Prison and Museum of Vietnamese Women can be visited in the French area of the city.

=== Hanoi Opera House ===
Hanoi's Opera House is designed based on the Palais Garnier, which is the older of Paris' two opera houses. It is considered as one of Hanoi's most iconic landmarks. Built from 1901 to 1911, the opera house served as a project by the French Government when they occupied Vietnam. It was designed and supervised by Harley and Broyer with many comments from other architects. The work involved 300 workers and was made from 35,000 bamboo poles, concrete blocks, iron and steel. The purpose of the building was for Western artists to perform to the French Colonists. Vietnamese elites could enter on events only if they dressed up and were charged extra more money for tickets.

=== Long Bien bridge ===
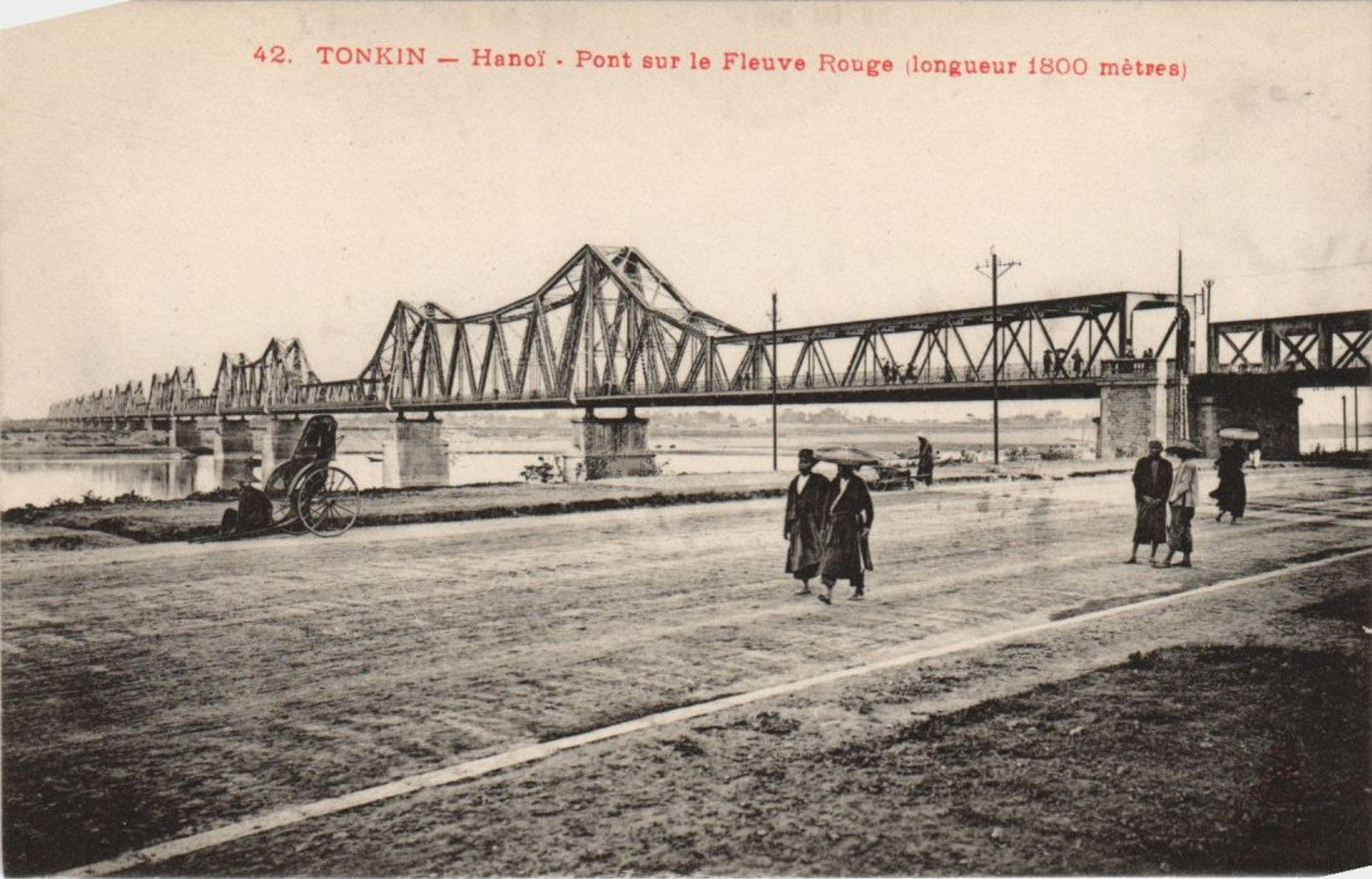
The Bridge, soon after completion

Built from 1899 to 1902, designed by Gustave Eiffel, the 2.4-kilometre bridge was the longest bridge in Asia for its time. Although built by the French, the majority was built by (3000) Vietnamese. During the period of French, The bridge was formerly named Paul Doumer. It signified a symbol of architecture in South East Asia. It acted as a connection point to transport goods from Northern Vietnam to the Dien Bien battle. It also contributed to the win of Vietnam army against the French in 1954.

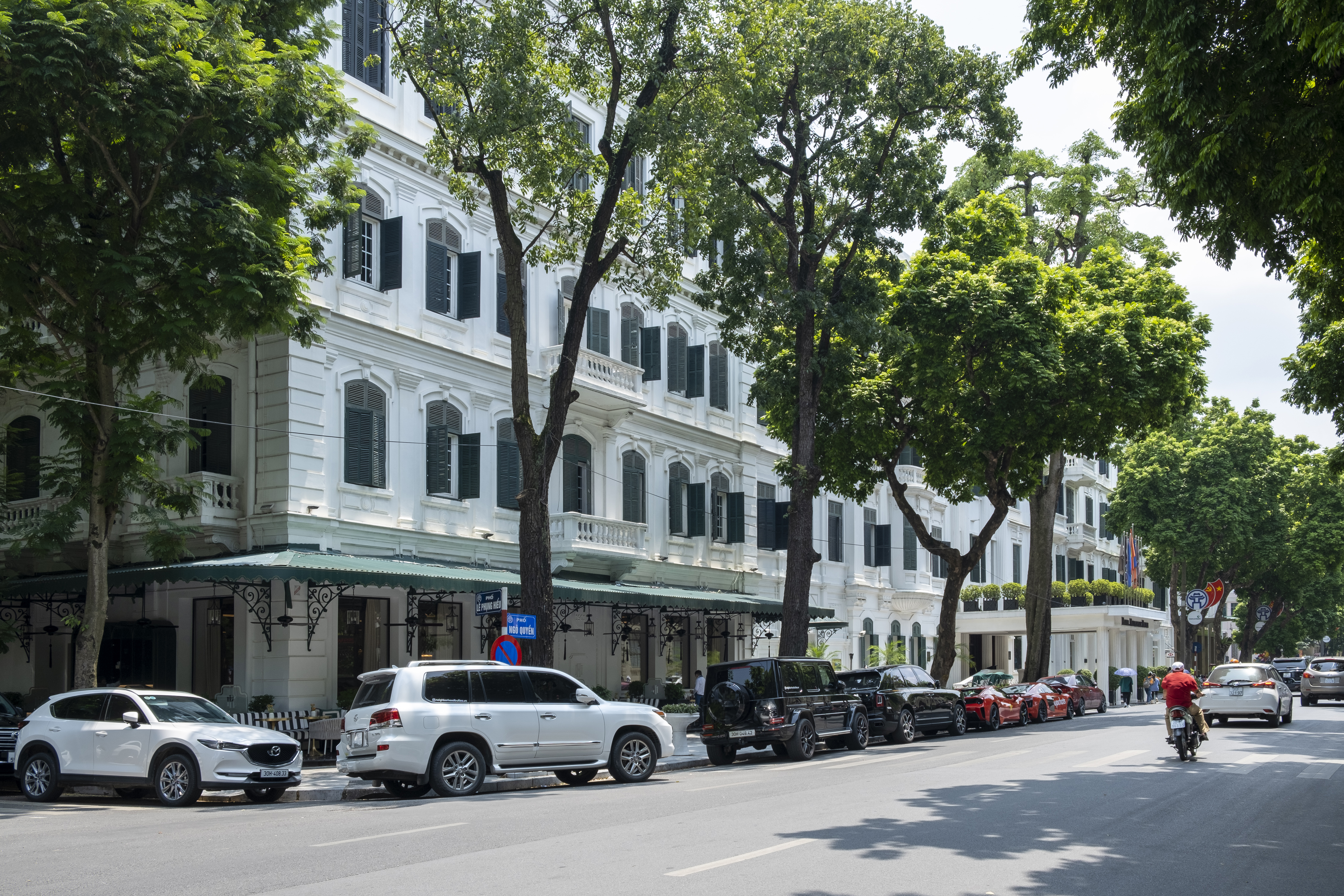
The outside of the Sofitel Legend Metropole Hanoi, showing the typical colonial overhangs, and multi-story neo-classical design

=== Sofitel Legend Metropole Hanoi ===
The Sofitel Legend Metropole Hanoi, original known as the Grand Hotel Métrople opened in 1901. It was constructed with a French Colonial architectural style and designed by André Ducamp and Gustave-Émile Dumoutier. In the 1950s the hotel was converted into the 'Thong Nhat Hotel', meaning Reunification, whereby the hotel was used by the Vietnams government as a guesthouse to those visiting the area. In the 1960s, the hotel constructed a bomb shelter to protect guests and employees against American air raids. During the war, the hotel rooms were converted into embassies for various countries.

The hotel is divided up into two wings; the historic Metropole wing and the Opera wing, which started in 1994 and completed in 2008. The Metropole wing has multi-story space features chandelier's, bamboo furniture, and wooden walls. This wing is also space to Le Club, which overlooks the hotel's courtyard garden which also includes a colonial Bamboo Bar. The Opera wing rooms are designed to replicate the neoclassical style, with items such as standalone bathtubs and finished with mahogany furnishings and Vietnamese fabrics.

== Saigon ==
Saigon (Ho Chi Minh City) has architectural styles influenced by French, Chinese, American, and Khmer cultures. The most prominent are the French colonial buildings, particularly in the French Quarter, while Chinese influences are seen in Chinatown and the port. American influence is less visible architecturally but is evident in the city's modern infrastructure and some buildings related to the Vietnam War including the Fall of Saigon to the Viet Cong forces with its communist roots of Marxist-Leninist faction by Ho Chi Minh. Khmer artifacts are housed at the Ho Chi Minh City Museum of Fine Arts, showcasing a legacy of the Khmer Empire. Saigon has both Chinese and Cambodian influences once became part of French Cochinchina and Indochina reflected in its history and architecture, particularly within the city's historical sites and architectural styles. UNESCO does recognize and support the preservation of cultural heritage in Vietnam, including the historical and architectural features of Ho Chi Minh City.

== Singapore ==
Singapore was planned and designed by Sir Stamford Raffles in 1822. As a major trading hub, Singapore's wealth increased throughout the 19th Century.

=== The Asian Civilisations Museum ===
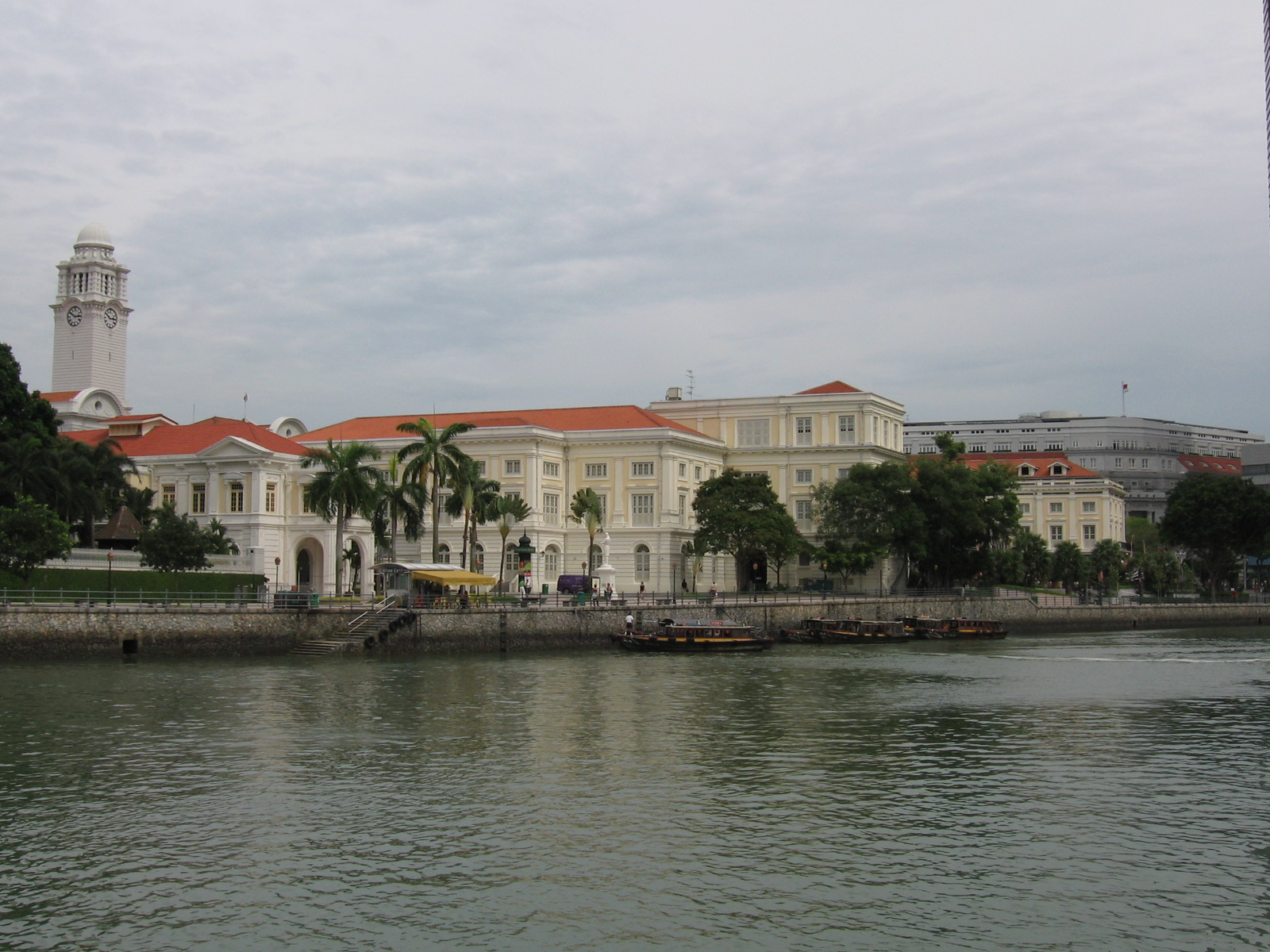
Asian Civilisations Museum, viewed from the Singapore River

The Asian Civilisations Museum was formerly built as the Empress Place Building, which opened in 1867. It was initially named Government House. The original design was to be a courthouse however it soon became housing for colonial government offices (Government Secretariat as well as Treasury and Stamp Office). The building hosts a neoclassical Palladian style. It has timber-louvred windows and pitched clay tiles. Inside has high ceilings, plaster mouldings and Doric columns.

=== Shophouses ===
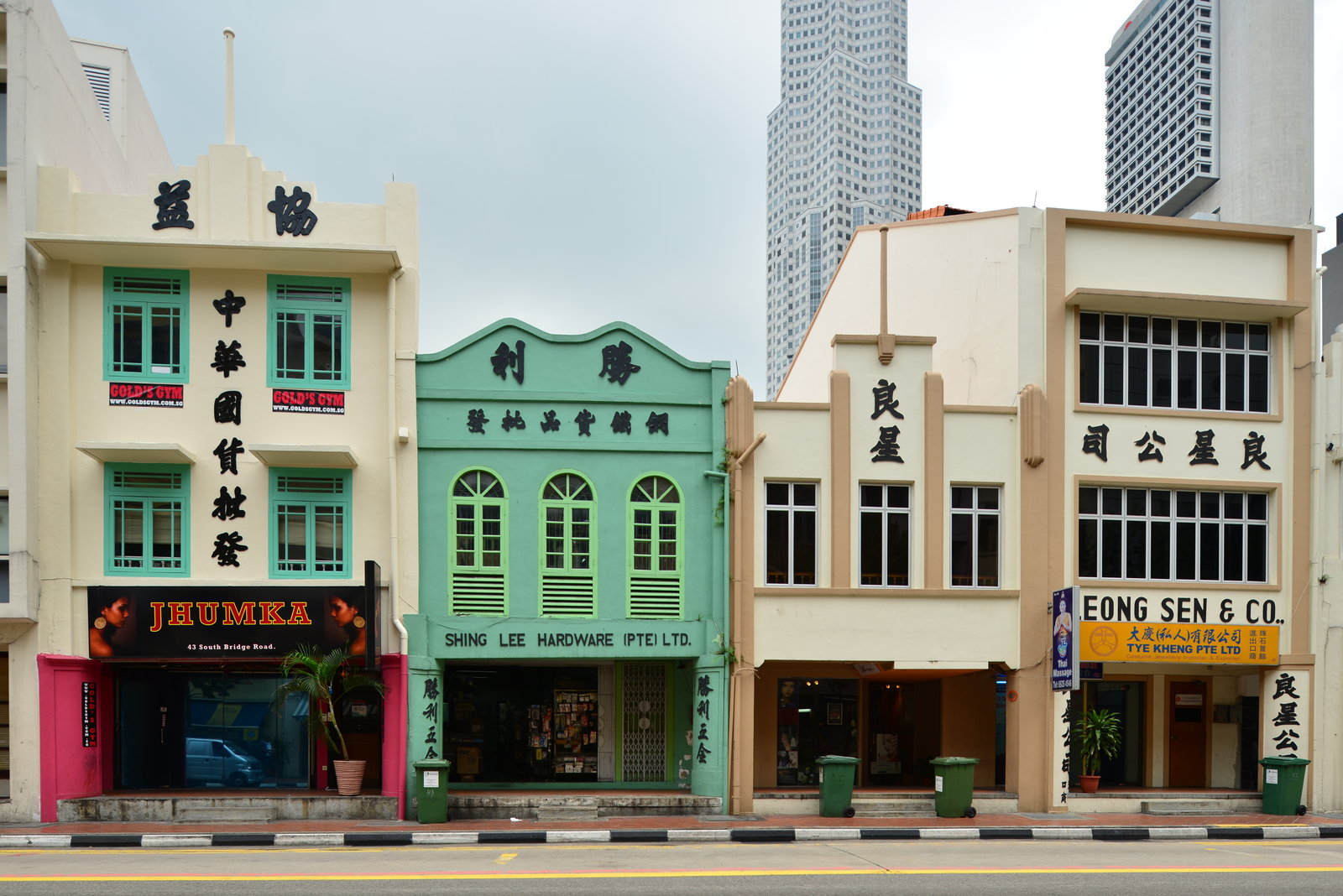
Shophouses in Singapore

Shophouses in Singapore have two stories and long narrow design. They were designed and made from 1840 to 1960. Often having continuous walls, they had a canopy overhanging the walkway known as a 5-foot-way. Sir Stamford Raffles designed them in a way that every house should have a verandah. The original shophouses were low with Doric columns. The early 1900s saw the first of the transitional style, these were taller in height and began using ornamentation. The late style (1900-1940), also known as the 'Singapore electric', was the most exotic with ornamentation and Chinese symbols mixed in with the traditional characteristics. They exhibited bright tiles, plaques and festoons. The Second Traditional style and Art Deco style embodied a more traditional approach with coloured ceramic tiles and streamlined designed.

== Yangon ==
Yangon has the highest concentration of Colonial buildings in the world. Yangon and Myanmar first was a colony of Britain in 1824 shortly after the First Anglo-Burmese War and was until independence in 1948.

=== Ministers building ===
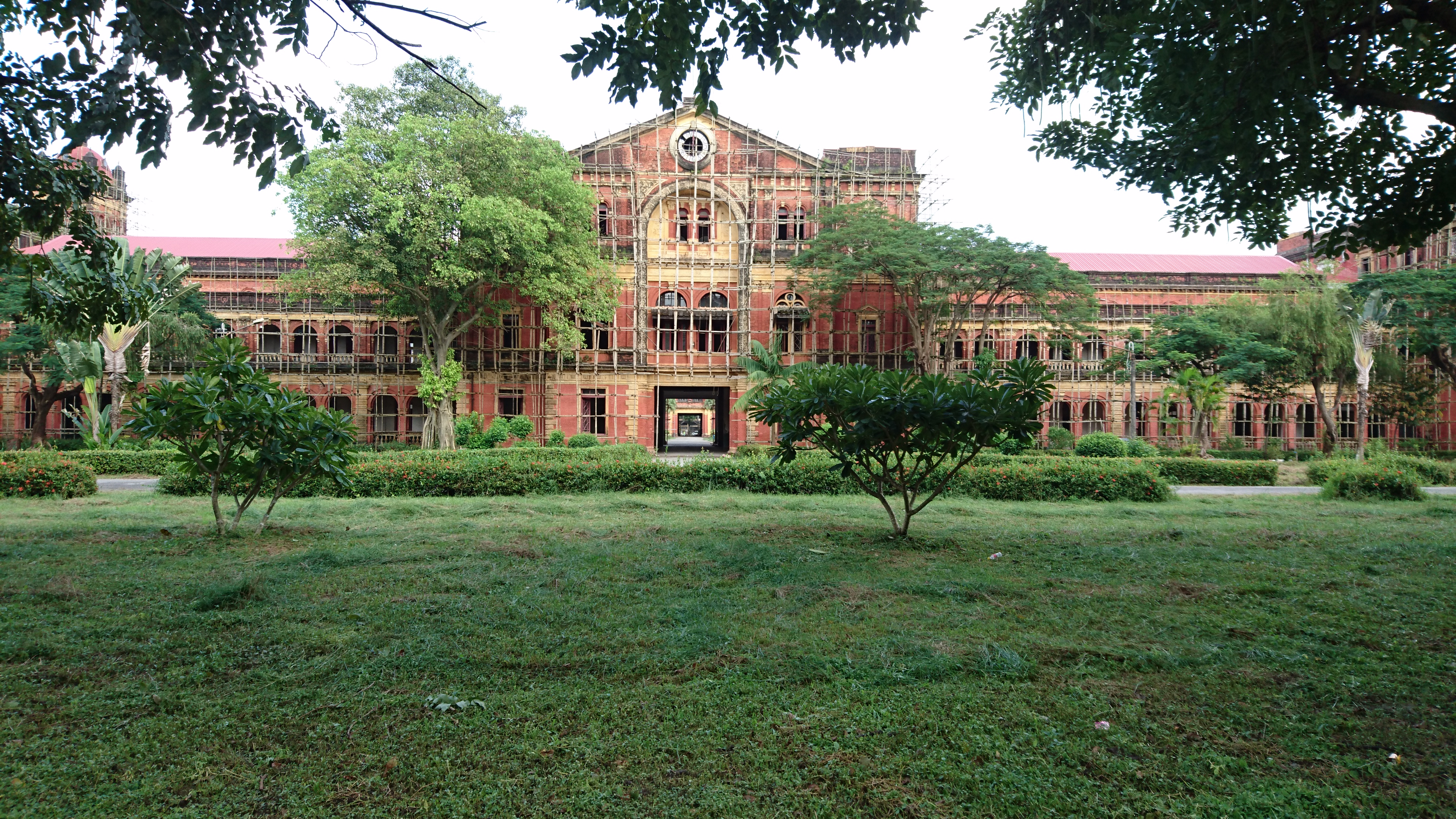
Ministers building

The ministers building was built in a period from 1889 between 1905. It was originally used for administrative services for British-Burma. It became a hub for Colonial- bureaucracy. It covers a vast 400,000 square feet of building area and is an icon of Myanmar's colonial-era architecture. Designed by British architect Henry Hoyne-Fox, the building constructed in two main stages (the south and north wings). The wings of the building have classical red brick buildings with some cast stone dressings which are arranged in a semi-circle within the inner quadrangle. There are also a number of surrounding buildings that were constructed after the initial building between the period from 1905 to the 1930s. Due to the lack of sustainable use over time and the harsh tropical environment have left the space with numerous conservation challenges.

=== High Court ===
The high court is another neo-Classical Victorian building situated in the centre of Yangon across from Independence Park. The building was completed in 1911, designed by James Ransome. The entire building acts as a courtyard and is still used for local court today. The courthouse is known for its British Queen Anne style architecture. This includes a similar red-bricked exterior and a clock tower.
