= Muhammadan Mosque =

Mosque in Padang, West Sumatra, Indonesia

- Masjid Muhammadan
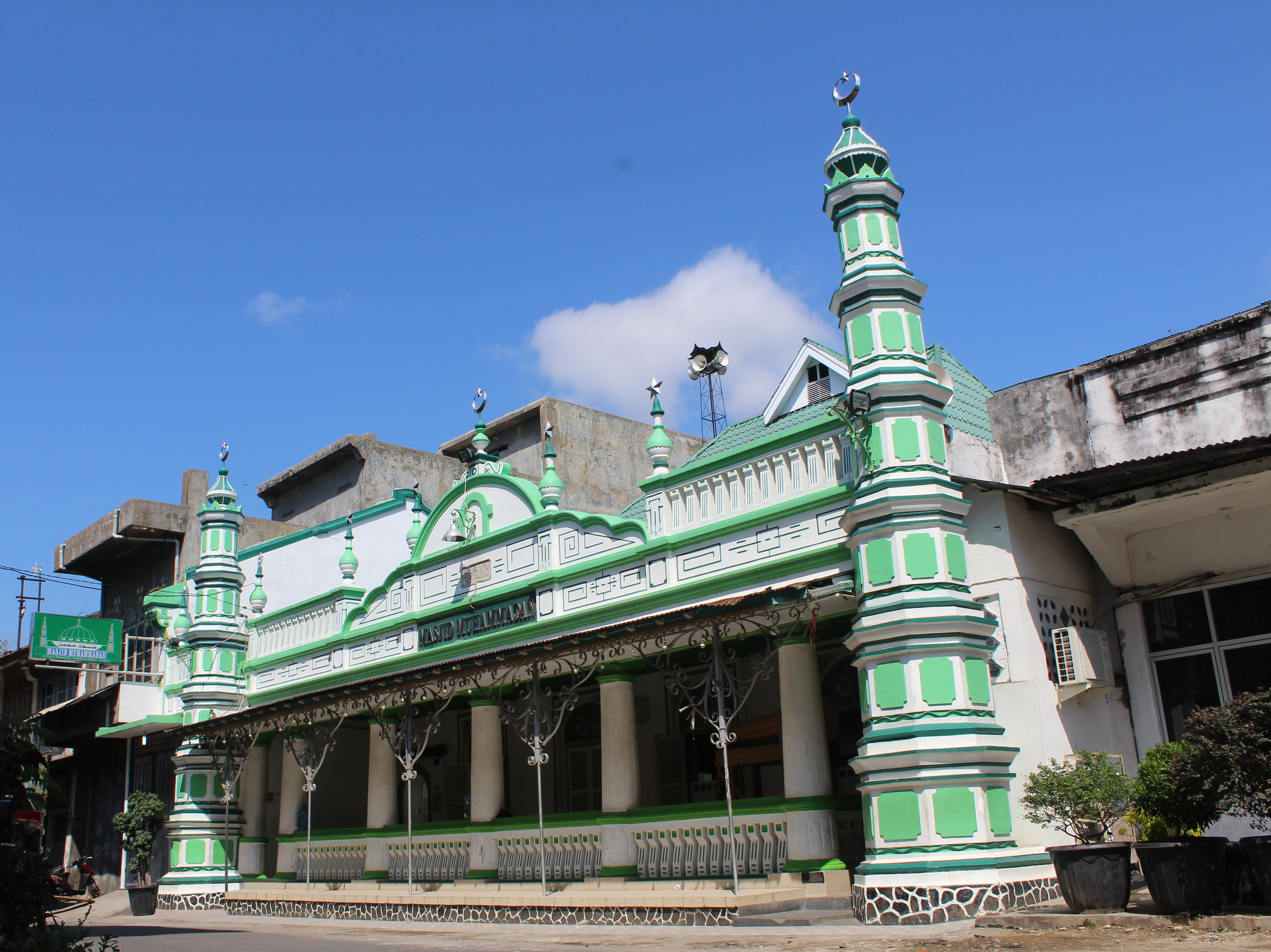

- Location within Indonesia

Religion
- Affiliation: Islam
- Branch/tradition: Sunni

Location
- Location: Padang, West Sumatra, Indonesia
- Interactive map of Muhammadan Mosque
- Coordinates: 0°57′41.4″S 100°21′51.3″E

Architecture
- Type: Mosque
- Style: Indian Mughal
- Established: 1843

The Muhammadan Mosque (Indonesian: Masjid Muhammadan) is a historic mosque in Padang, West Sumatra, Indonesia. It was constructed in 1843 and is associated with trade and traders from Gujarat, Mughal India. It is located on Batipuh Pasa Street in the South Padang District.

== See also ==
- Islam in Indonesia
- List of mosques in Indonesia
