= Fort Rotterdam =

Dutch fort built in Makassar on the island of Sulawesi in Indonesia

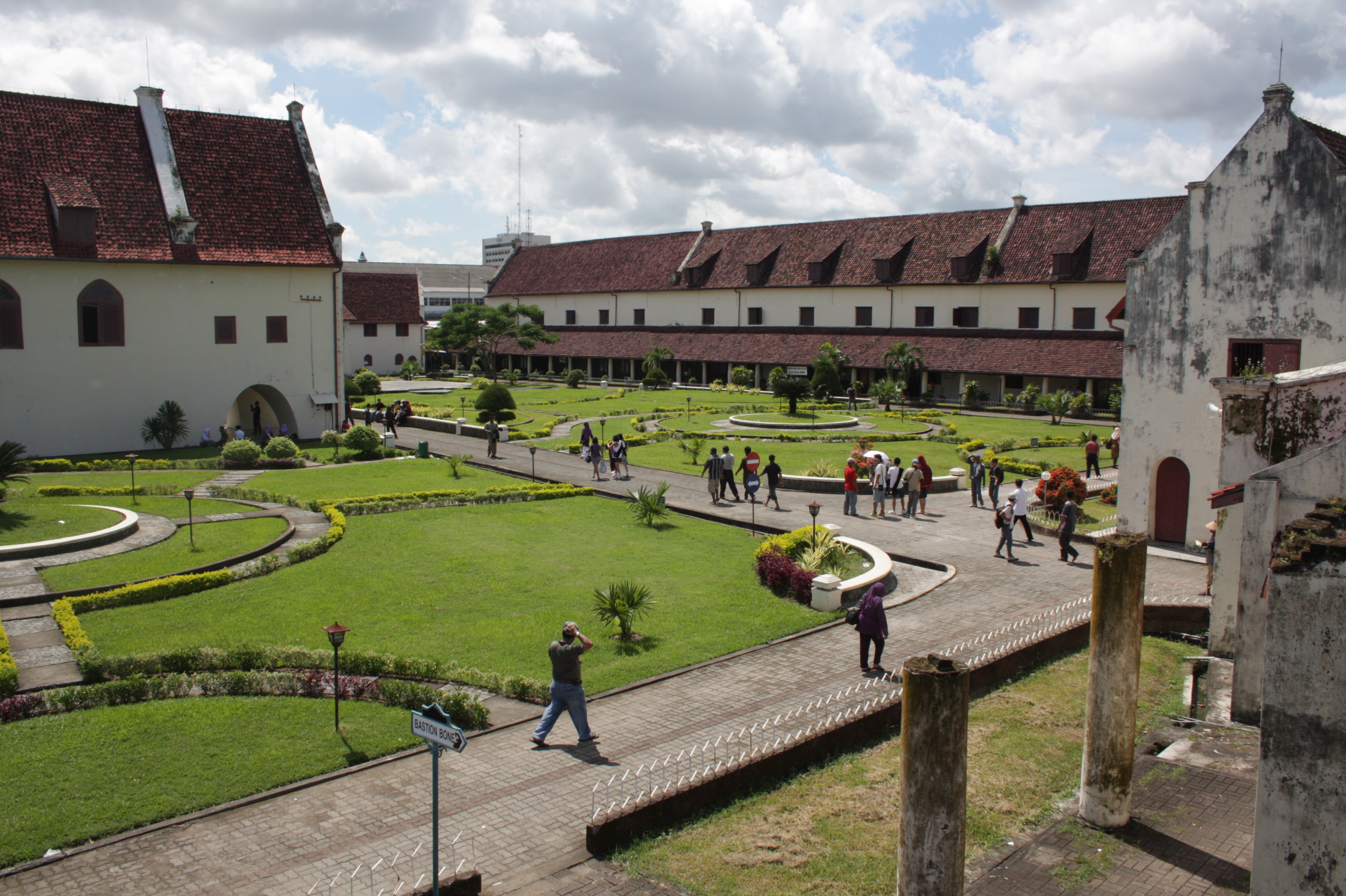
- Fort Rotterdam in 2010

- Location within Indonesia

General information
- Architectural style: 17th century colonial
- Location: Makassar, Indonesia
- Coordinates: 5°08′03″S 119°24′20″E
- Construction started: 1673
- Completed: 1679

Technical details
- Structural system: Stone built barracks fort

Fort Rotterdam is a 17th-century fort in Makassar on the island of Sulawesi in Indonesia. It is a Dutch fort that was built on top of an existing fort of the Gowa Kingdom. The first fort on the site was constructed by the a local sultan around 1634, to counter Dutch encroachments. The site was ceded to the Dutch under the Treaty of Bongaya, and they completely rebuilt it between 1673 and 1679. It had five bastions and 1 ravelin, it was surrounded by a seven meter high rampart and a two meter deep moat.

The fort was the Dutch regional military and governmental headquarters until the 1930s. It was extensively restored in the 1970s and is now a cultural and educational centre, a venue for music and dance events, and a tourist destination.

== History ==
Fort Rotterdam was built on the location of an earlier Makassarese fort, called Ujung Pandang. It seems more likely that the earlier fort was built in 1634, as part of a fortification programme that the Makassar rulers undertook in response to a war with the Dutch East India Company (abbreviated as VOC) which broke out in that year. The original fort, Jum Pandan (allegedly named after the pandanus trees growing in the vicinity), gave its name to the city Ujung Pandang, another name for the city of Makassar.

In 1667 Fort Ujung Pandang was ceded to the Dutch as part of the Treaty of Bongaya, after the defeat of the Sultanate of Gowa in the Makassar War. In subsequent years it was entirely rebuilt on the initiative of Dutch admiral Cornelis Speelman, to become the center of Dutch colonial power in Sulawesi. It was renamed Fort Rotterdam after Speelman's place of birth. In the years 1673–1679 it got its five bastions and the 'turtle' shape it still has to this day. This shape gave the fort the nickname "Benteng Penyu" ("sea-turtle fort").

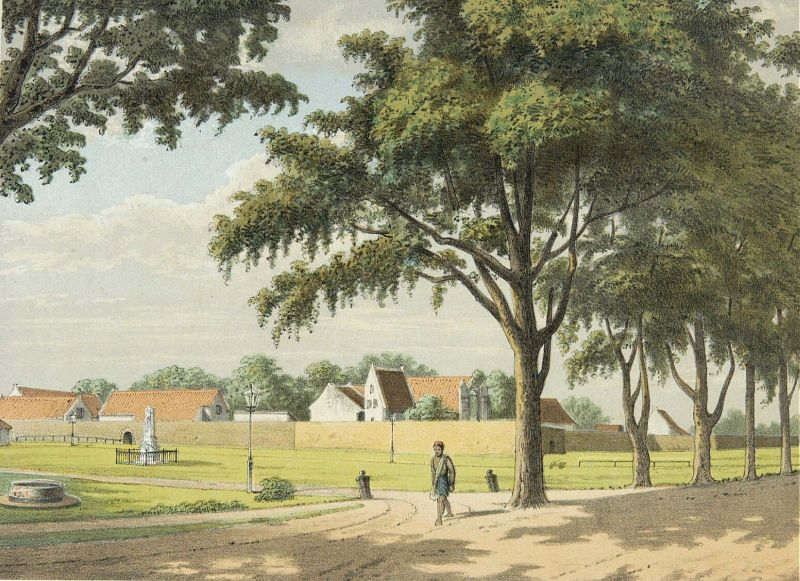
Fort Rotterdam in the late 19th century

The stone for the construction of the fort was taken from the karst mountains in Maros, the limestone from Selayar and the timber from Tanete and Bantaeng. Following the Java War of 1825–1830, Javanese prince, and now national hero, Diponegoro was imprisoned in the fort following his exile to Makassar in 1830 until his death in 1855. It was also used as a Japanese prisoner of war camp in World War II.

Fort Rotterdam remained the regional Dutch military and governmental headquarters until the 1930s. After 1937, the fort was no longer used as a defense. During the brief Japanese occupation it was used for conducting scientific research in the field of linguistics and agriculture, after which it fell into disrepair. In the 1970s, the fort was extensively restored.

== Description ==
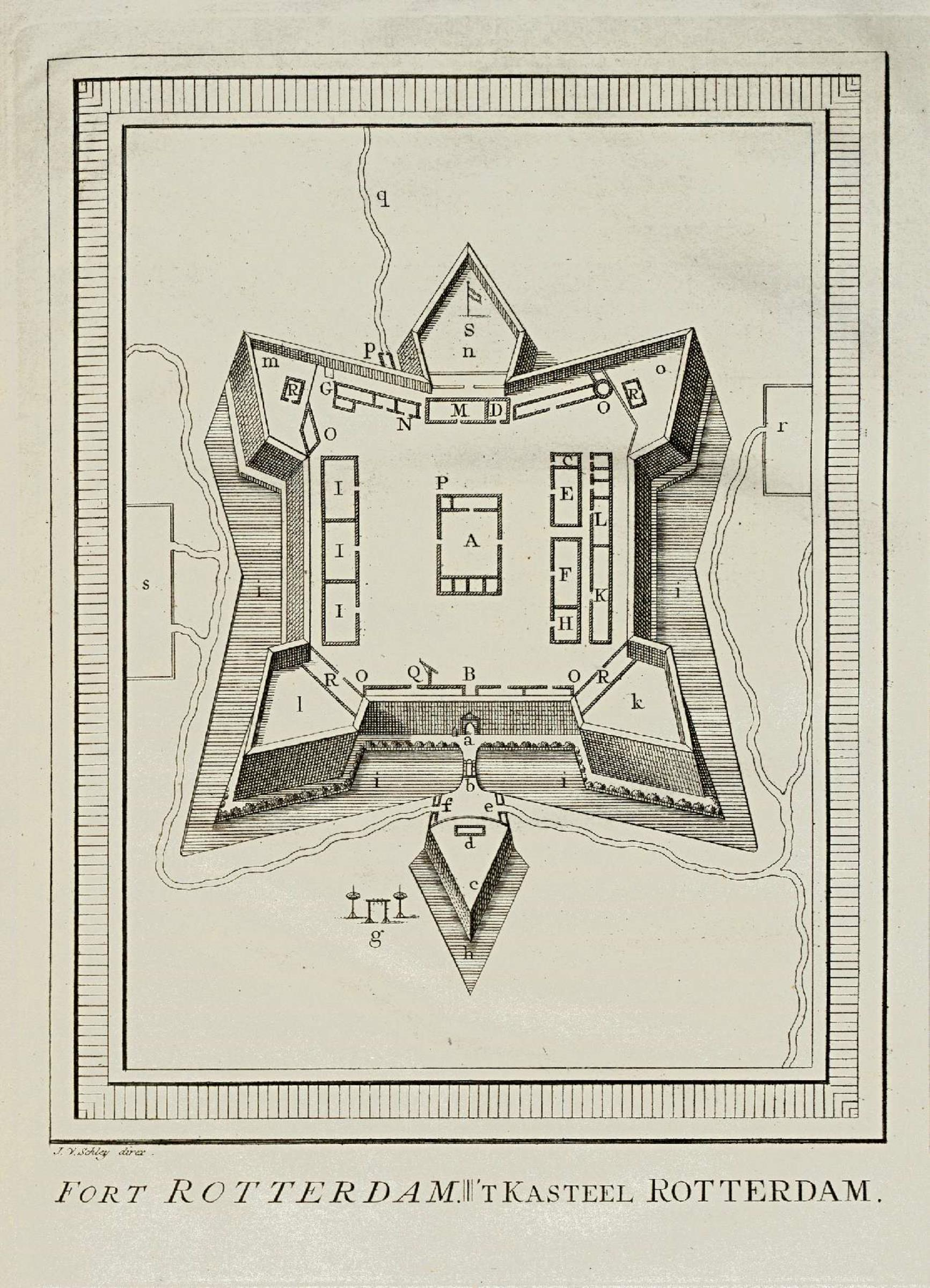
18th-century layout of Fort Rotterdam

Fort Rotterdam lies in the centre of Makassar. It is rectangular in shape, surrounded by a seven-meter wall. It was originally equipped with five bastions or demibastions, and one ravelin. All but the ravelin are still visible: Bastion Bonie (after Bone state) to the west; Bastion Boeton (after Buton Island) to the northwest; Bastion Batjang (after the Bacan Islands) to the southwest; Bastion Mandassar to the northeast; and Bastion Amboina (after Ambon) to the southeast. Bastion Ravelin, is no longer visible. Some of the bastions still contain cannons. It is possible to walk over most of the ramparts. A two meter deep moat system used to surround the perimeter of the fort, however only the southwest portion of the moat can still be seen.

== Current status ==
Inside the fort are thirteen buildings, eleven of them are 17th-century original buildings of the fort; most are still in good condition. At the centre of the fort is a church building. Several buildings along the north and south curtain walls still exist. The buildings along the northern curtain wall were some of the oldest, dating from 1686, such as the residence of the governor, residence of the senior merchant, of the captain, the predikant, and the secretary, with several storage buildings for weapons. The governor's residence at the north-westernmost corner is nicknamed "the Speelman's House", however Speelman himself never actually lived in this house. The house was used by the governor of Celebes until the mid-19th century, when he moved to a more comfortable villa in Jalan Ahmad Yani. The Speelman's House now houses part of La Galigo museum. La Galigo museum has some prehistoric megaliths from Watampone, as well as ancient weapons, coins, shells, utensils, sketches and stamps.

The buildings on the south curtain, originally used for storage, house a museum displaying local skills in silk weaving, agriculture and boatbuilding; and scale models of indigenous boats. The barracks on the eastern wall now house a small library, featuring old Dutch books that mostly belonged to Reverend Mates, a 19th-century missionary. There are also ships' logs of VOC captains and ancient lontar manuscripts. The department of archaeology is housed in the former building of the head of administration for the VOC; the ground floor of the building, located in the southeast corner of the fort, was formerly a prison. The other two buildings inside Fort Rotterdam were built by the Japanese during the Japanese occupation period. The southwestern Bastion (Bastion Bacan) contains a prison where Prince Diponegoro was imprisoned at the end of his life.

The fort is now used for holding various events. There is a conservatory for music and dance, an archive of the city, and a historic and archaeological institute.

== See also ==
- Colonial architecture in Indonesia

== Works cited ==
- Andaya, Leonard (2001). Reid, Anthony; Jay, Sian; Durairajoo, T. (eds.). Indonesia Heritage: Early Modern History - South Sulawesi After Arung Palakka. Vol. 3. Singapore: Didier Millet. ISBN 9789813018327.
- Backshall, Stephen (2003). Rough Guide Indonesia (illustrated ed.). Singapore: Rough Guides. ISBN 9781858289915.
- Bulbeck, David (1998). "Construction History and significance of the Makassar fortifications". Living through histories: culture, history and social life in South Sulawesi. Canberra: Dept. of Anthropology, Research School of Pacific and Asian Studies, the Australian National University. pp. 67–106. ISBN 9780731532186.
- Carey, Peter (2001). Reid, Anthony; Jay, Sian; Durairajoo, T. (eds.). Indonesia Heritage: Early Modern History - Dipanagara and the Java War. Vol. 3. Singapore: Didier Millet. ISBN 9789813018327.
- Mattulada (1991). Menyusuri Jejak Kehadiran Makassar Dalam Sejarah, 1510-1700. Ombak: University of Michigan. ISBN 9789795300045.
- Pemugaran, Proyek (1986). Pemugaran benteng Ujung Pandang, Sulawesi Selatan, Marlborough, Bengkulu, Duurstede, Maluku (in Indonesian). Jakarta: Departemen Pendidikan dan Kebudayaan, Proyek Pemugaran dan Pemeliharaan Peninggalan Sejarah dan Purbakala. OCLC 19769161.
- "Makassar - bezienswaardigheden". Travel Marker (in Dutch). Travel Marker. 2015. Archived from the original on 19 November 2015.
