= Bernardus Compostellanus Antiquus =

Bernard of Compostella the Older (Bernardus Compostellanus Antiquus) was a canonist of the early thirteenth century, a native of Compostela in Spain. He is called Antiquus to distinguish him from Bernardus Compostellanus Junior.

He became a professor of canon law in the Italian University of Bologna.

Bernard compiled a collection of the decrees promulgated by Innocent III during the first ten years of his pontificate (1198–1208). This work, often called by the scholars of Bologna "Compilatio Romana", because the author took his documents from the Roman archives, was not of much practical worth, since an official or authentic collection, extending to 1210, rendered Bernard's compilation superfluous. Only portions of either of these collections were printed (ed. "Ant. Augustini Opera", Lucca, 1769, IV, 600-608) until 1914.
