= Bernardus Compostellanus Junior =

Bernard of Compostella (Bernardus Compostellanus Junior or Modernus) lived in the middle of the thirteenth century, called Compostellanus from the fact that he possessed an ecclesiastical benefice in Compostella. He was known also as Brigantius from his birthplace in Galicia, Spain; later of Monte Mirato, Bernard was chaplain to pope Innocent IV, a noted canonist.

At Innocent's exhortation he wrote a work entitled Margarita, an index of Innocent's Apparatus, or commentary on the five books of the Decretals of Gregory IX. The Margarita was published in Paris, 1516.

Bernard was the first to write a commentary on the constitutions of Innocent IV (not published).

A third work was entitled Casus seu Notabilia on the five books of Decretals, which was intended as a complete and practical commentary, but which owing to the author's death, did not go beyond the title sixth of the first book, consequently not published.

== See also ==
- Bernardus Compostellanus Antiquus
