= Bert van Sprang =

Dutch astronomer (1944–2015)

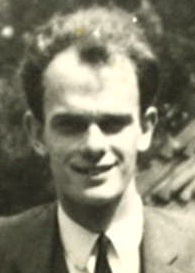
Bert van Sprang, Summer 1968, astronomy camp, Vierhouten

Bernardus Wilhelmus Maria "Bert" van Sprang (20 June 1944 in Tilburg – 17 November 2015 in Pijnacker) was the founder of the Dutch youth division ("JWG", or Jongerenwerkgroep) of the Dutch association of meteorology and astronomy ("NVWS", or Nederlandse Vereniging voor Weer- en Sterrenkunde) in 1967. Activities carried out by Van Sprang for the JWG included the organization of astro camps, the setting up of a program to build telescopes cheaply, and the writing of many booklets on astronomy topics. He was also program leader of the planetarium in The Hague until it was destroyed by fire in February 1976. The main-belt asteroid 3098 van Sprang was named after him.

== Bibliography ==
- Govert Schilling & Bert van Sprang, De levensloop van de zon, Stichting De Koepel, 1979
- Bert van Sprang, Wegwijs in het zonnestelsel, Stichting Universum, 1988, ISBN 90-800205-1-6
- Govert Schilling & Bert van Sprang, Wegwijs in het Universum. Een handleiding opzoekboek voor JWG-leden. Brochure nr. 56, Jongerenwerkgroep N.V.W.S., 1980
