= Asyikin–Brugman Treaty =

1906 treaty between Buton and the Dutch East Indies

- Signed: April 8, 1906
- Location: The ship de Ruyter
- Effective: (April 8, 1906), April 26, 1906
- Expiry: (April 19, 1906), 1942
- Signatories: Sultan Muhammad Asyikin; (Dutch East Indies) Johan Brugman
- Parties: Sultanate of Buton; Dutch East Indies

The Asyikin–Brugman Treaty was a treaty signed between the Sultanate of Buton and the Dutch East Indies on 8 April 1906 on board the ship de Ruyter. It was named after the signatories, Sultan Muhammad Asyikin of Buton, and Johan Brugman, the Dutch resident (a form of civil servant) for Sulawesi.

== Background ==
The previous sultan, Muhammad Umar, was staunchly anti-Dutch and rejected a proposal for the Dutch resident from Sulawesi to appoint a representative in the sultanate territory on 18 July 1887. The Dutch negotiator attempted another contact—this time accompanied by armed soldiers—but this approach was also rejected, resulting in significant political tension between the two parties. In the aftermath of this incident, in 1904 Umar instructed several forts to be built outside of the traditional sultanate territory, notably the Kalidupa and the Wasuamba forts, as a place to flee to if the royal palace and the main Wolio Fort should ever fall.

However, Umar's reign was short-lived, and when he died in 1905, he was replaced by Sultan Muhammad Asyikin, who was perceived by the Dutch as softer than Umar. Immediately after Asyikin's ascension to the throne in 1906, he was approached to sign the new treaty. A Dutch ship, the de Ruyter, arrived with a Dutch resident, Johan Brugman, on board on 2 April 1906, and the treaty was signed after brief negotiation between the two on 8 April 1906.^{:84} A Dutch representative was immediately appointed and housed in a makeshift building outskirt of Baubau, capital of the sultanate.^{:78-87}

The treaty contained 29 articles in total and revoked all previous treaties if they were incompatible with it. It forbade the Sultanate from conducting its own foreign policy, or from contacting other nations without approval of the Dutch. All appointments within the royal government were subject to prior Dutch approval; the Sultanate was to be placed under the legal jurisdiction of the Dutch colony based in Makassar; and all laws passed in Makassar would also be applied to Buton.^{:91-97}

== Aftermath ==
The treaty made the Sultanate one of the dependencies under the Dutch East Indies governorate, later becoming Zelfbesturende Landschappen. However, the treaty was briefly revoked just eleven days later on 19 April 1906 due to the Sultan's changing his mind. A note regarding this decision was sent to the Dutch resident in Makassar.^{:84} On 26 April, the colonial government threatened a naval invasion by returning the de Ruyter to Baubau with contingent of armed soldiers and readied an expedition force in Makassar. This made the Sultan to change his mind again.^{:84}

In the aftermath of economic expansion within Buton Island by the Dutch, several small kingdoms and dependencies of the Buton Sultanate, such as Sorawolio and Badia, were abolished by 3 May 1910. In August 1911, rebellion against the imposition of the new forestry-goods-related taxation was led by La Ode Boha but it was crushed; La Ode Boha was exiled to Java. In 1912, a similar anti-taxation rebellion arose in Wakatobi in response to the treaty.

The treaty was once again revoked unilaterally by the Sultanate during the Japanese invasion of Dutch East Indies in 1942, which thereafter stayed independent until it voluntarily joined the newly independent Indonesia Republic. Because of the treaty revocation, the Sultanate claimed that it had never been colonized by European powers and handed its power directly to Indonesia instead.
