= South Sulawesi campaign =

South Sulawesi campaign or South Sulawesi expedition may refer to:

- South Sulawesi expeditions of 1905, by the Dutch colonial government against the kingdoms of Bone and Gowa
- South Sulawesi campaign of 1946–1947, by the Dutch colonial government against Indonesian republicans

== See also ==
- Dutch–Bone wars
