= Dutch–Bone wars =

The Dutch–Bone wars (1824–1906) were a series of conflicts between the Netherlands and the Bone state in southern Sulawesi (Celebes).

- First Bone War (1824–25)
- Second Bone War (1859–60)
- Third Bone War (1905–06)
