= British expedition to Makassar =

1814 military expedition

Coordinates: 5.1308°S 119.4215°E

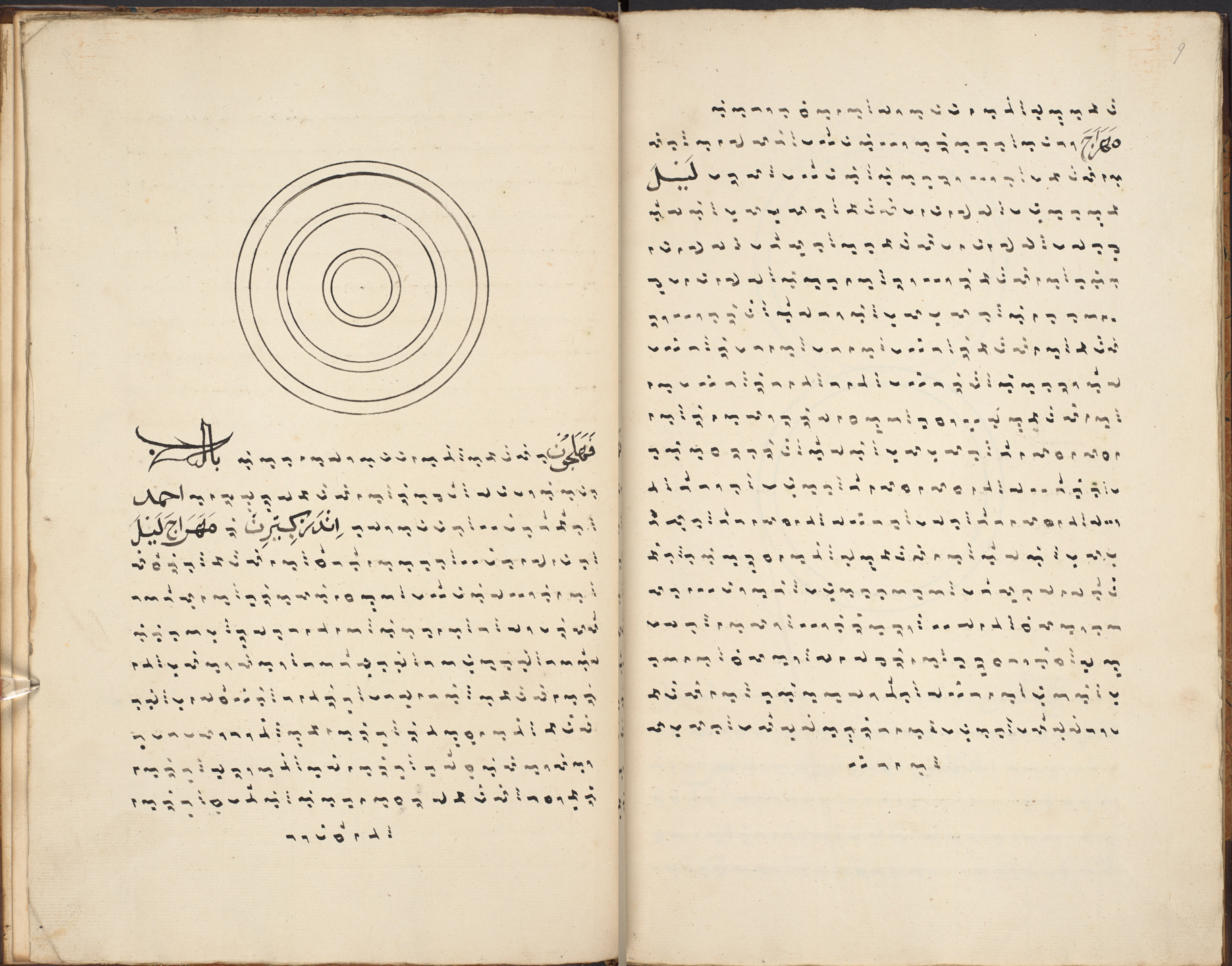
- A Bugis treatise on gunnery, taken in the expedition
| Date | 7 or 8 June 1814 |
| Location | Bontoala, near Makassar |
| Result | British victory |

Belligerents
| Bone Sultanate | United Kingdom |

Commanders and leaders
| La Mappatunruq | Miles Nightingall |

The British expedition to Makassar was a British military expedition held in June 1814 against the Bone Sultanate in modern South Sulawesi. The military campaign was targeted at the palace of the Sultan of Bone, located in modern Makassar, in order to force Bone's acknowledgement of British authority in South Sulawesi. The palace was taken and burned, with the British seizing Bone's library in the process.

== Background ==
The Bone Sultanate in Southern Sulawesi had been the dominant native power in the region since the Makassar War in the late seventeenth century. When the British invaded Java in 1811, the newly installed governor of the Dutch East Indies Stamford Raffles sought to establish permanent British influence in the region through establishing British positions outside Java.

In 1812, La Mappatunruq (or Muhammad Ismail Muhtajuddin) became the new Sultan of Bone. He attempted to increase his influence in the region over smaller states, and showed hostility to the new British government. In early June 1814, having subjugated the raja of Buleleng in an expedition to Bali, a British force arrived in Makassar under the command of Miles Nightingall.

== Expedition ==
On 6 June 1814, Nightingall demanded La Mappatunruq submit to British supremacy by handing over the regalia of the Sultanate of Gowa, which was in Bone's possession. La Mappatunruq was given a deadline of ten hours to do so, and did not. Thus, Nightingall ordered an attack on the Bone palace in Bontoala, within modern-day Makassar city. The British force was supported by local troops from Gowa and Soppeng.

The attack took place on either 7 or 8 June, and the palace was overrun with heavy losses on the Bone side. Five cannons were captured by the British, and the raja of Bulukumba (a Bone ally) was killed during the fighting. Bone forces retreated towards Maros after the fighting.

== Aftermath ==
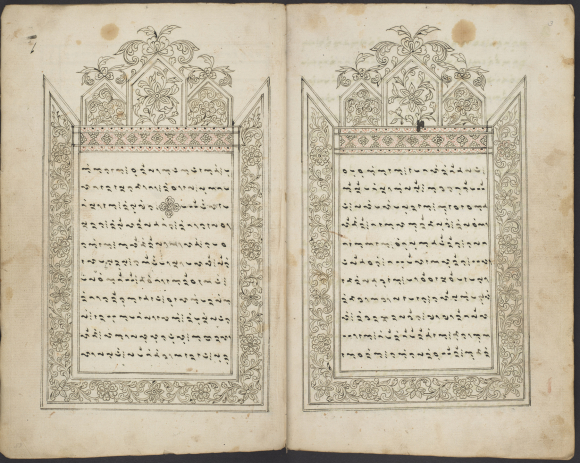
A Bugis poetry collection taken during the expedition.

After the capture of the palace, a number of manuscripts from Bone's royal library were seized, with Crawfurd acquiring 30 manuscripts written in Bugis and Makassarese. They are now held in the British Library. A number of manuscripts remained, later seized by the Dutch in their 1905 expeditions. The palace was afterwards burned. The Gowan regalia were also captured, and were given to the raja of Soppeng.

British influence in the region did not last long, as the Dutch returned to power in 1816.
