= WAWB =

WAWB may refer to:

- WAWB-LP, a low-power radio station (107.3 FM) licensed to West Branch, Michigan, United States
- WAMY-TV, a cable television station (channel 8) licensed as a sub-channel of WZDX to Huntsville, Alabama, United States, which used the fictional call sign WAWB-TV from January 1995 to September 2006
- Betoambari Airport (ICAO:WAWB), Baubau, Indonesia
