= Babau (disambiguation) =

A babau is the eastern Mediterranean equivalent of a bogeyman.

Babau may also refer to:

- Babau (Dungeons & Dragons), creature in Dungeons & Dragons
- Baubau, city in Indonesia
