= Betoambari Airport =

Betoambari Airport Bandar Udara Betoambari
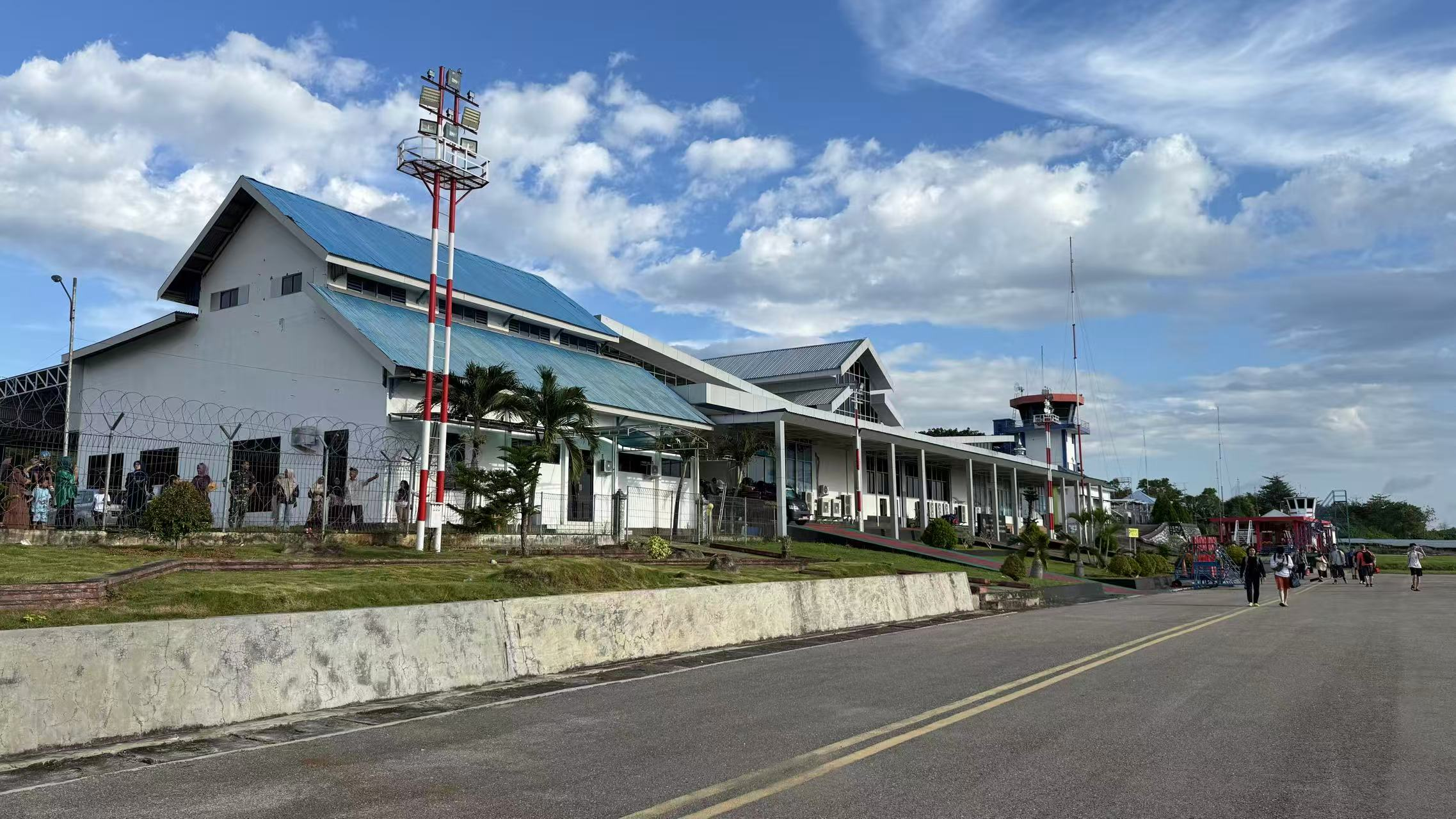
- IATA: BUW; ICAO: WAAB

Summary
- Airport type: Public
- Owner: Government of Indonesia
- Operator: Directorate General of Civil Aviation
- Serves: Baubau
- Location: Baubau, Southeast Sulawesi, Sulawesi, Indonesia
- Time zone: WITA (UTC+08:00)
- Elevation AMSL: 32 m (105 ft)
- Coordinates: 05°31′00″S 122°33′00″E

Map
- Location of the airport in Sulawesi

Runways
Direction	Length		Surface
Direction	m	ft	Surface
04/22	2,010	6,594	Asphalt

Statistics (2024)
- Passengers: 68,923 (▼13.55%)
- Cargo (tonnes): 134.30 (▼10.43%)
- Aircraft movements: 1,184 (▼25.25%)
- Source: DGCA

Betoambari Airport (IATA: BUW, ICAO: WAAB) is a domestic airport near Baubau, the largest town in the island of Buton in the province of Southeast Sulawesi, Indonesia. The airport is named after the district in which it is located and lies approximately 5 km (3.1 miles) southeast of Baubau city center. It is the only airport on Buton Island and serves as the main gateway to both Baubau and the wider island. As of 2026, the airport is connected only to Makassar, the capital of South Sulawesi, with services solely operated by Wings Air. In the past, it also offered flights to Kendari and Wakatobi, although these routes have since been discontinued.

== History ==
Betoambari Airport began construction in 1975–1976, when the Government of Buton Regency allocated a site in Katobengke Subdistrict, Betoambari District, Baubau City. Construction was carried out by the Indonesian Army Corps of Engineers, as the terrain consisted largely of solid rock; in addition to heavy machinery, explosives were used to level the site. The pioneer airstrip was completed in 1976 with a runway measuring 820 × 23 meters. Its operation was officially inaugurated on 22 October 1976 by Vice President Sultan Hamengkubuwono IX. Initially owned by the Buton Regency Government, the airport was later transferred to the Directorate General of Civil Aviation on 7 November 1978.

There are proposals to rename the airport as Sultan Himayatuddin Muhammad Saidi Airport, in honor of Himayatuddin Muhammad Saidi, also known as Oputa Yi Koo, an 18th-century ruler of the Sultanate of Buton who resisted Dutch colonization. He has been officially recognized as a national hero of Indonesia.

On 25 December 2024, the first Airbus A320 landed at Betoambari Airport, operated by Super Air Jet. The airline initially operated charter flights between Makassar and Baubau before launching scheduled services on 7 April 2025. There are plans to launch direct flights between Baubau and Jakarta in the future, as well as reopening previously discontinued routes to cities such as Ambon.

There have been land disputes in areas surrounding the airport, making land clearing for expansion more difficult. The conflicts primarily stem from disagreements between the airport authority and local residents. Protests have occurred on several occasions, at times disrupting airport operations and flights.

== Facilities and development ==
In 2018, the airport apron was relayered due to surface subsidence, as the previous pavement had become dilapidated and posed operational risks. In 2019, the runway was extended from its original dimensions of 1,800 m × 30 m to 2,010 m × 30 m to accommodate narrow-body aircraft such as the Boeing 737 Classic, at a cost of approximately Rp 38 billion. Future plans include extending the runway further to 2,500 m × 45 m, and eventually to 3,000 m x 60 m in order to accommodate wide-body aircraft.

In the long term, a new larger terminal and a larger apron will be constructed on the west side of the runway, as the current terminal has reached overcapacity due to the annual increase in passenger traffic.

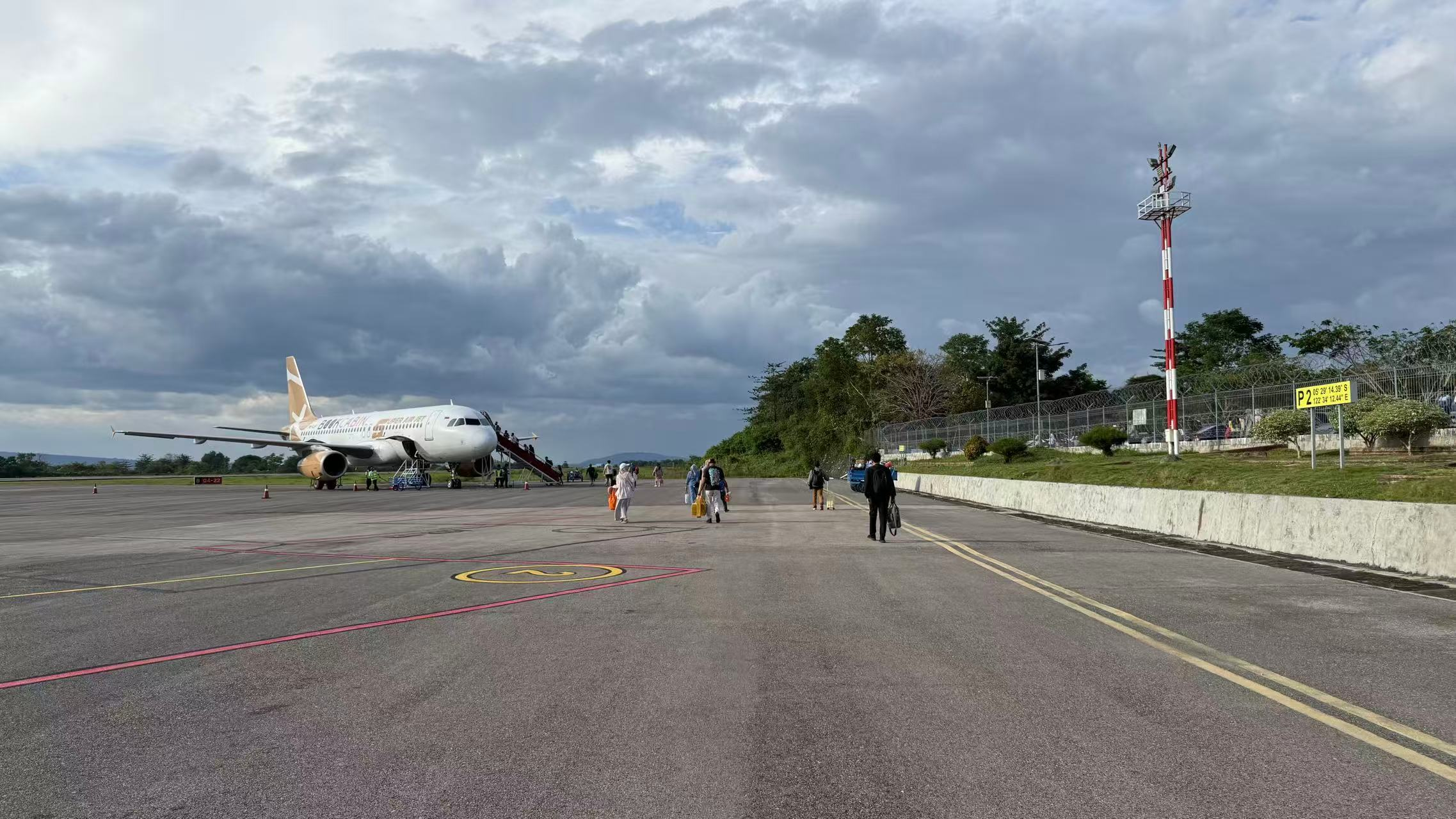
Apron view of the airport

== Airlines and destinations ==
Airlines	Destinations
Wings Air	Makassar

== Statistics ==
Annual passenger numbers and aircraft statistics
Year	Passengers handled	Passenger % change	Cargo (tonnes)	Cargo % change	Aircraft movements	Aircraft % change
2008	11,518	Steady	1.17	Steady	486	Steady
2009	11,125	▼3.41	0.18	▼84.62	564	▲16.05
2010	74,726	▲571.69	3.83	▲2027.78	2,448	▲334.04
2011	54,373	▼27.24	N/A	Steady	2,227	▼9.03
2012	114,761	▲111.06	N/A	Steady	2,942	▲32.11
2013	100,907	▼12.07	N/A	Steady	1,770	▼39.84
2014	94,831	▼6.02	N/A	Steady	1,594	▼9.94
2015	121,660	▲28.29	189.56	Steady	2,293	▲43.85
2016	152,480	▲25.33	240.20	▲26.71	2,529	▲10.29
2017	243,696	▲59.82	168.00	▼30.06	4,325	▲71.02
2018	268,319	▲10.10	229.66	▲36.70	4,959	▲14.66
2019	176,776	▼34.12	241.56	▲5.18	3,191	▼35.65
2020	110,845	▼37.30	136.64	▼43.43	2,259	▼29.21
2021	115,065	▲3.81	168.47	▲23.29	2,277	▲0.80
2022	99,186	▼13.80	188.10	▲11.65	1,905	▼16.34
2023	79.726	▼19.62	149.94	▼20.29	1,584	▼16.85
2024	68,923	▼13.55	134.30	▼10.43	1,184	▼25.25
^{Source: DGCA, BPS}
