= Buleleng expedition =

Coordinates: 8.1266°S 115.0969°E

Date	12–14 May 1814
Location	Buleleng, Bali
Result	British victory

Belligerents
Buleleng Kingdom	United Kingdom

Commanders and leaders
I Gusti Gde Karang	Miles Nightingall

Strength
	c. 3,000

Casualties and losses
None	None

The Buleleng expedition took part in May 1814 by British forces against the Buleleng Kingdom of Bali, led by Miles Nightingall. Intended as a punitive expedition against Buleleng's raids in Eastern Java, the expedition obtained the submission of Buleleng's king I Gusti Gde Karang without violence.

== Background ==
After the British takeover of Java, the slave trade was officially abolished, resulting in financial difficulties for the Balinese kingdoms. One of the kingdoms, Buleleng, seized an East India Company ship in early 1814. Around 130 soldiers from Buleleng, under Gusti Wayan Karangasem, brother of the reigning king Gusti Gde Karang, also launched a raid against Banyuwangi in Java. While the attack was repulsed without much difficulty, the British colonial government under Stamford Raffles decided to launch a punitive expedition. Raffles had previously visited Bali, and believed that the island could become an ally to the British in the future as it had never been conquered by the Dutch.

== Expedition ==
The expedition departed on 12 May 1814, with a strength of around 3,000 soldiers under Major General Miles Nightingall. Included in the expedition were the 59th and the 78th Regiments and elements of the Bengal Army. The expedition also aimed to curb the slave trade from Bali, but the trade was largely not disrupted by the expedition and continued. Nightingall's force arrived at Buleleng on 14 May.

Upon arrival of the expeditionary force, the Buleleng king I Gusti Gde Karang immediately submitted, inviting Nightingall into his palace and requested pardon. He blamed his brother for the attack, claiming that he had no control over it, and Nightingall did not press the issue. As a guarantee, Gde Karang handed two hostages. In a 19 May report to Raffles, Nightingall wrote that "peace once again reigned". Nightingall's force proceeded to Makassar afterwards, in another expedition to Makassar. Raffles appointed a new resident in Bali later in 1814 to prevent further disputes with the Balinese.
