= Bone State =

Former country in Indonesia

Sultanate of Bone (House of Royal Buginese Bone) ᨕᨀᨑᨘᨂᨛ ᨑᨗ ᨅᨚᨊᨛ Akkarungeng ri Bone (Buginese)
- 14th century–1905; 1931–1950
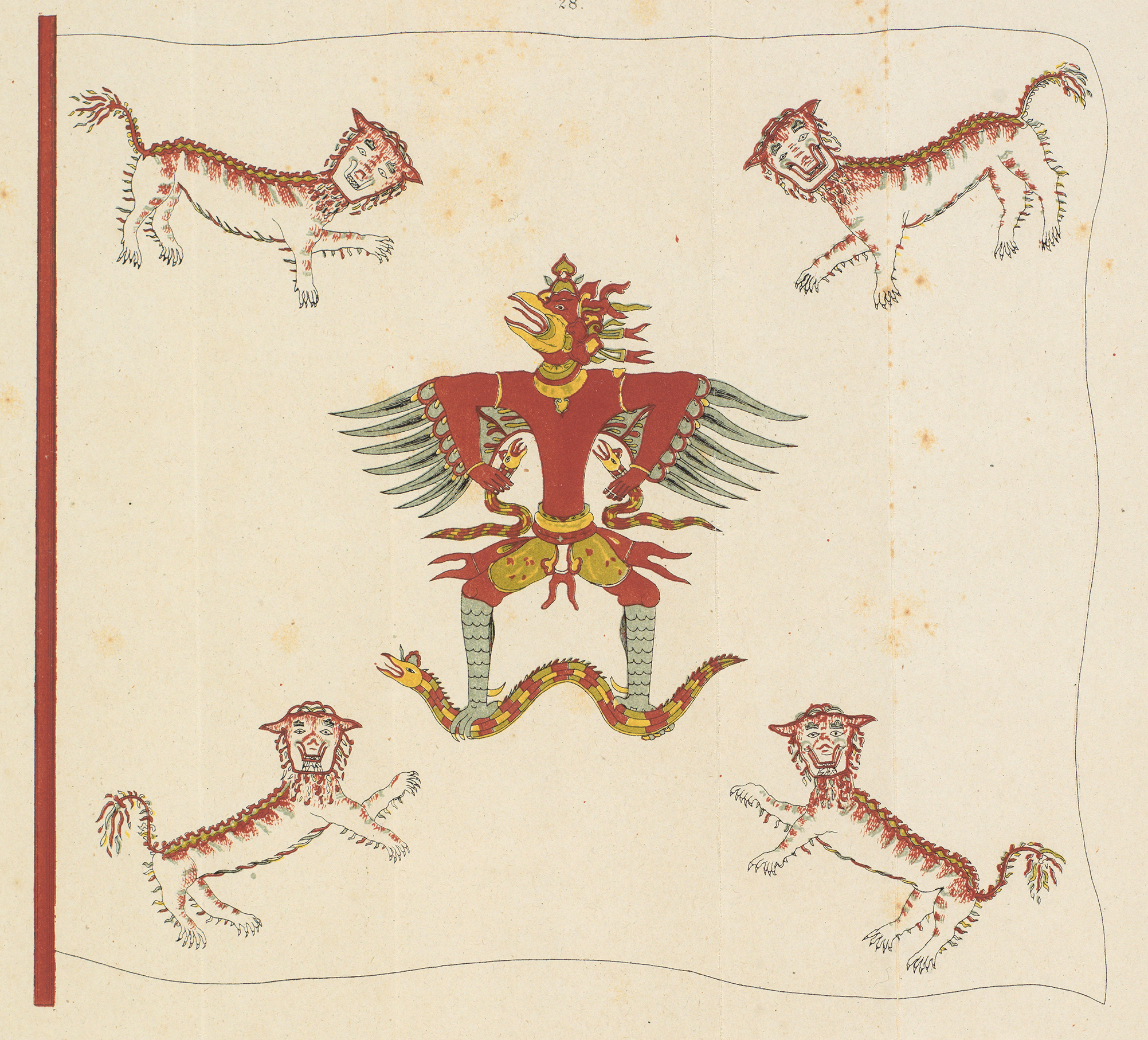
- Flag

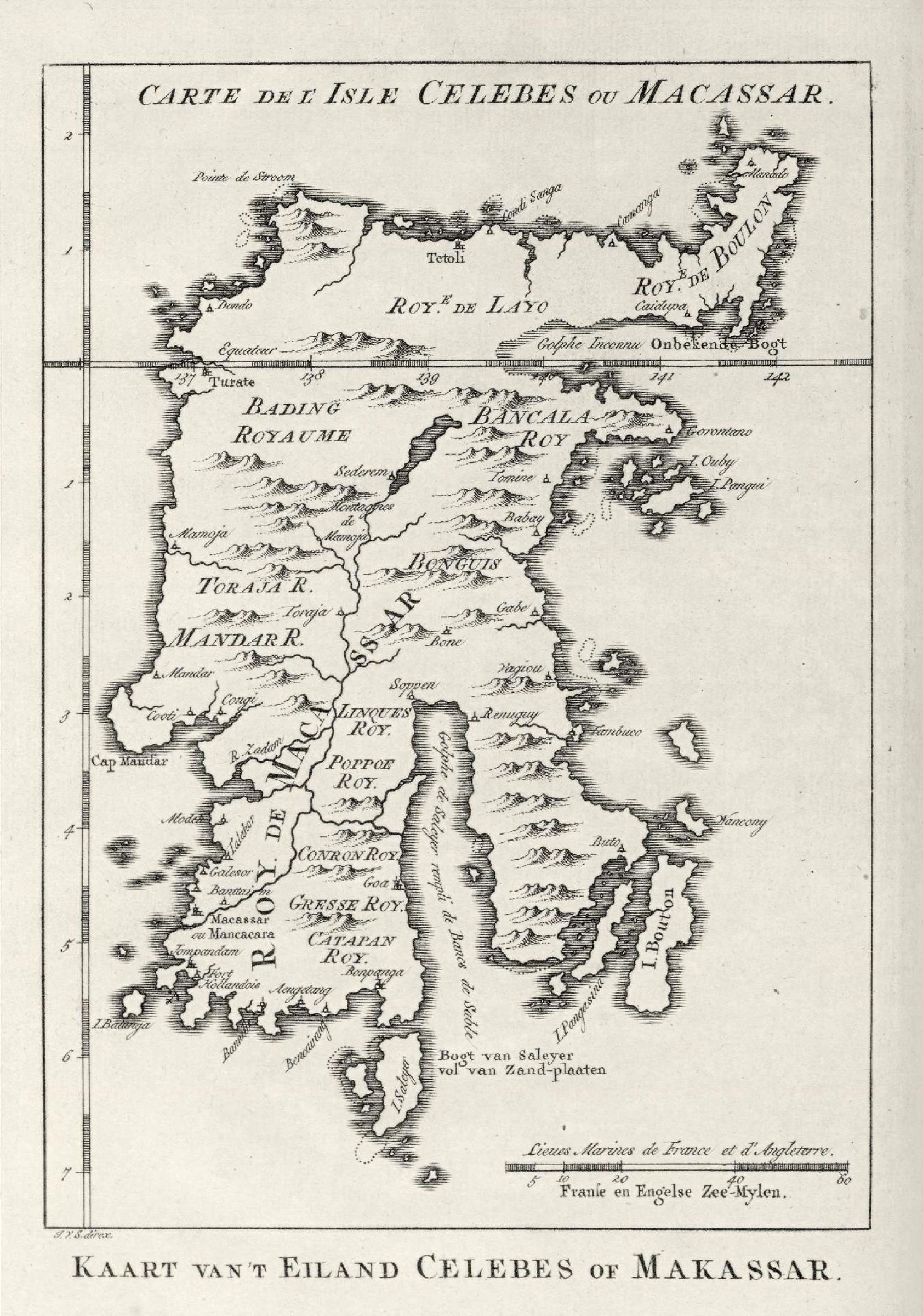
- Capital: Watampone
- Common languages: Bugis
- Religion: Sunni Islam
- Government: Monarchy
- Sultan, Arung Mangkaue' ri Bone
  - 1300s: Manurunge ri Matajang
  - 1358-1424: Petta Panre Bessie
  - 1672-1696: Sultan Saaduddin Arung Palakka
  - 1931-1946: Andi Mappanyukki
- History
  - Established: 14th century
  - Loss of independence to the Dutch: 1905
Succeeded by
Dutch East Indies; Republic of Indonesia
- Today part of: Indonesia (as Bone Regency)

Bone (also Boni, or Bone Saoraja) or Bone State was a sultanate in the south-west peninsula of what is now Sulawesi (formerly Celebes), a province of modern-day Indonesia. It came under Dutch rule in 1905, and was succeeded by the Bone Regency.

Covering an area of 2,600 square kilometres (1,000 sq mi), Bone's chief town Boni, lay 130 kilometres (81 mi) northeast of the city of Makassar, home to the Bugis people.

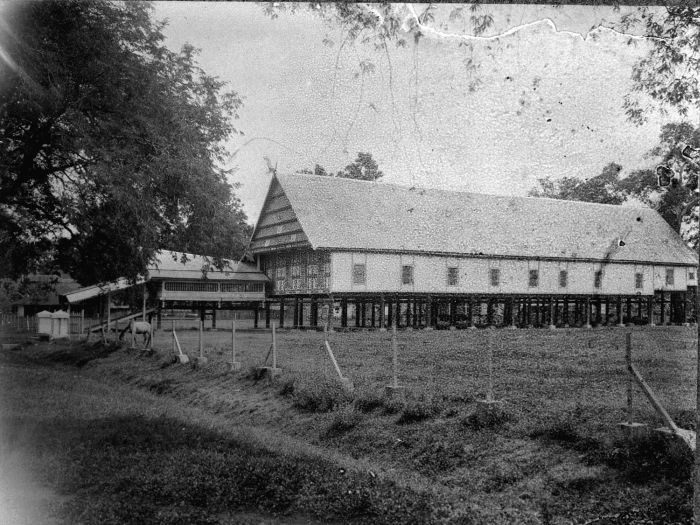
Bola Soba, palace to receive guests; c. 1900-1920

== History ==
Bone was an adat-based Bugis kingdom whose origins can be traced back to the early 15th century. Its chronicle (as yet unpublished) provides detailed information on its rulers, starting from La Umasa, who ruled in the early 15th century, through to La Tenrtatta, who died in 1699. Under La Umasa and his nephew La Saliu (Kerrépelua) who succeeded him, Bone expanded from a handful of settlements around the modern capital Watampone to a small kingdom roughly one-third the size of Kabupaten Bone (the present regency).

In the early 16th century the kingdom expanded northwards, fighting with Luwu for control of the mouth of the River Cenrana, a major east coast trade exit. In 1582 Bone entered an alliance with the Wajo and Soppeng kingdoms for mutual defence against the rising power of Gowa-Tallo. This alliance became known as Tellumpocco'e (lit. the Three Summits) or LaMumpatue Ri Timurung (lit. The burying of the stones at Timurung).

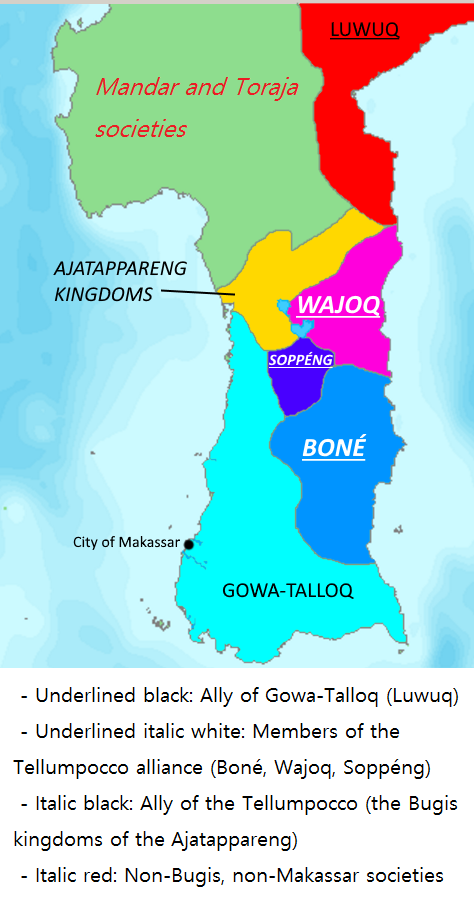
Geopolitical map of kingdoms in South Sulawesi in 16th century

In 1611, during the reign of the tenth king of Bone We Tenrituppu MatinroE ri Sidenreng, Bone was invaded by the Sultanate of Gowa and pressured to convert to Islam. Bone State later enjoyed a period of prosperity in the middle of the 17th century.

Bone became the most powerful state of South Sulawesi under Arung (ruler of) Palakka, La Tenritatta (1634 or 1635 – 1696) who sided with the Dutch admiral Cornelis Speelman against the Makasar kingdom of Gowa-Tallo, which led to the defeat and capture of Makassar in 1669. From this year until 1814 when the British temporarily gained power in the region, Bone was by treaty and in practice the overlord of South Sulawesi, with the exception of Dutch-controlled areas on the west and south coast, including the important port-city of Makassar. When the Dutch returned to Makassar in 1816 they attempted to reduce Bone's status from equal to vassal, a move strongly resisted by Bone's rulers.

Over the course of the 19th century, the power of Bone was reduced as a result of several wars waged against it in 1824, 1859 and 1905. Following a military defeat during the South Sulawesi expeditions of 1905, the Bone State lost its independence to the Dutch. Bone, along with Gowa, became under direct administration.

In the late 1920s, the Dutch restored many royal rulers as a way to suppress the tide of nationalist sentiment. Bone was no exception; in 1931, Mappanyuki, a scion of both the houses of Gowa and Bone, was restored to his family's ancestral position in Watampone.

In May 1950, the people held demonstrations in Watampone against the royalty and Bone's membership in the State of East Indonesia. This caused the sultan to join Indonesia.

== List of rulers ==
Rulers of Bone used the title Arung Mangkaue' ri Bone (the king who resides in Bone), shortened to Arumpone, MangkauE, or ArungE' ri Bone.

List of Arumpone
No	Monarch	Gender	Reign
1	Manurung ri Matajang (Mata Silompoé)	Male	1350 – 1366
2	La Ummasa To'Mulaiyé Panra	Male	1366 – 1398
3	La Saliwu (Kerampelua)	Male	1398 – 1470
4	Wé Benrigau' Daéng Marawa, Mallajang' ri Cina	Female	1470 – 1490
5	Tenrisukki, Mappajungngé	Male	1490 – 1517
6	La Uliyo Botoé, Matinroé ri Itterung	Male	1517 – 1542
7	La Tenrirawe Bongkange, Matinroe ri Guccina	Male	1542 – 1584
8	La Ica, Matinroé ri Adénenna	Male	1584 – 1595
9	La Patawe, Matinroé ri Bettung	Male	1595 – 1602
10	I Dangka Wé Tenrituppu, Matinroé ri Sidénréng	Female	1602 – 1611
11	La Tenriruwa Arung Palakka (Sultan Adam Matinroé ri Bantaéng	Male	3 months in 1611
12	Tenripallé To'Akkeppeyang Arung Timurung, Paduka Sri Sultan 'Alauddin Matinroé ri Talloq	Male	1611 – 1626
13	La Maqdaremmeng, Paduka Sultan Muhammad Saleh Matinroé ri Bukaka	Male	1626 – 1643
14	La Tenriaji To'Senrima, Arung Awamponé Pawélaié ri Siang	Male	1643 – 1645
13	La Maqdaremmeng, Paduka Sultan Muhammad Saleh Matinroé ri Bukaka (restored)	Male	1667 – 1672
15	La Tenritatta To'Unru Malampéq-é Gemineqna Daéng Serang Arung Palakka, Paduka Sri Sultan Sa'aduddin Matinroé ri Bontoalaq	Male	1672 – 1696
16	La Patau Matanna Tikka Arung Palakka, Paduka Sri Sultan Idris Azimuddin Matinroé ri Nagauleng	Male	1696 – 1714
17	Batari Toja Daéng Talaga Arung Timurung, Datu Chitta Sultanah Zainab Zulkiyahtuddin Matinroé ri Tippulué	Female	1714 – 1715
18	La Paddasajati To'Appawareq Arung Palakka, Paduka Sri Sultan Sulaiman Matinroé ri Béula	Male	1715 – 1718
19	La Pareppa To'Soppéwali, Paduka Sri Sultan Shahabuddin Ismail Matinroé ri Somba Opu	Male	1718 – 1721
20	La Panaongi To'Pawawoi Arung Mampu Karaéng Bisei, Paduka Sri Sultan Abdullah Mansor Matinroé ri Bisei	Male	1721 – 1724
21	Batari Toja Daéng Talaga Arung Timurung, Datu Chitta Sultanah Zainab Zulkiyahtuddin Matinroé ri Tippulué (restored, 2nd reign)	Female	1724 – 1738
21	Batari Toja Daéng Talaga Arung Timurung, Datu Chitta Sultanah Zainab Zulkiyahtuddin Matinroé ri Tippulué (3rd reign)	Female	1741 – 1749
22	La Temmassongeq, Paduka Sri Sultan Abdul Razak Jalaluddin Matinroé ri Mallimongeng	Male	1749 – 5 June 1775
23	La Tenritappu, Paduka Sri Sultan Ahmad as-Saleh Syamsuddin Matinroé ri Rompegading	Male	5 June 1775 – 1812
24	La Mappatunruq, Paduka Sri Sultan Ismail Mokhtajuddin Matinroé ri Lalebbata	Male	1812 – 1823
25	I Maniratu Arung Data, Paduka Sri Sultanah Salehah Mahdi Rajiatuddin Matinroé ri Kessi	Female	1823 – 1835 (12 years)
26	La Mappaseling Arung Panynyiliq, Sultan Adam Najamuddin Matinroé ri Salassana	Male	1835 – 1845
27	La Parénrengi Arung Punyi, Paduka Sri Sultan Ahmad Salleh Muhiyuddin Matinroé ri Adiyang Bénténg	Male	1845 – 1857
28	Pancaitana Bessé Kajuara Tenriawaru Matinroé ri Majennang	Female	1857 – 1860
29	Singkerru Rukka, Paduka Sri Sultan Ahmad Idris Matinroé ri To'Paccing	Male	1860 – 1871 (11 years)
30	I Banrigau' Arung Timurung and Datu Chitta Paduka Sri Sultanah Fatimah Matinroé ri Bolampare'na	Female	1871 – 1895
31	La Pawawoi Arung Sijelling, Karaéng Sigeri Matinroé ri Bandung	Male	1895 – 1905
32	Andi La Mappanyukki Karaéng Selayar, Paduka Sri Sultan Ibrahim Matinroé ri Gowa	Male	1931 – 1946
33	Andi La Paqbénteng Daéng Palawa Arung Pitu and Arung Macégé Matinroé ri Matuju	Male	1946 – 1950

== See also ==
- Dutch–Bone wars
