= Baubau =

City in Southeast Sulawesi, Indonesia

- City
- City of Baubau; Kota Baubau
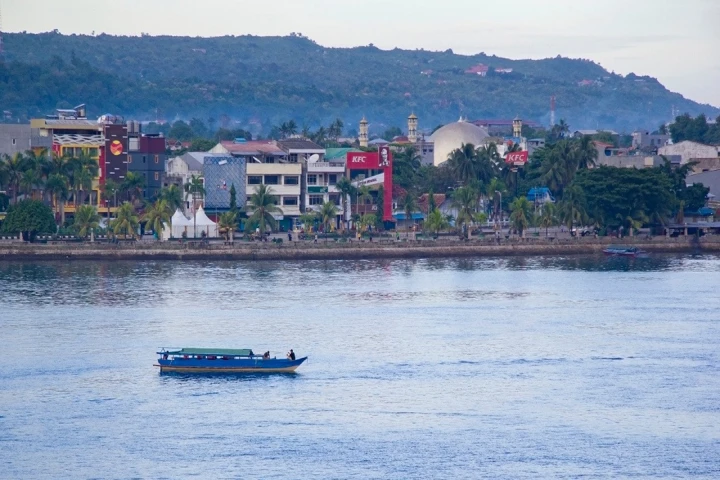
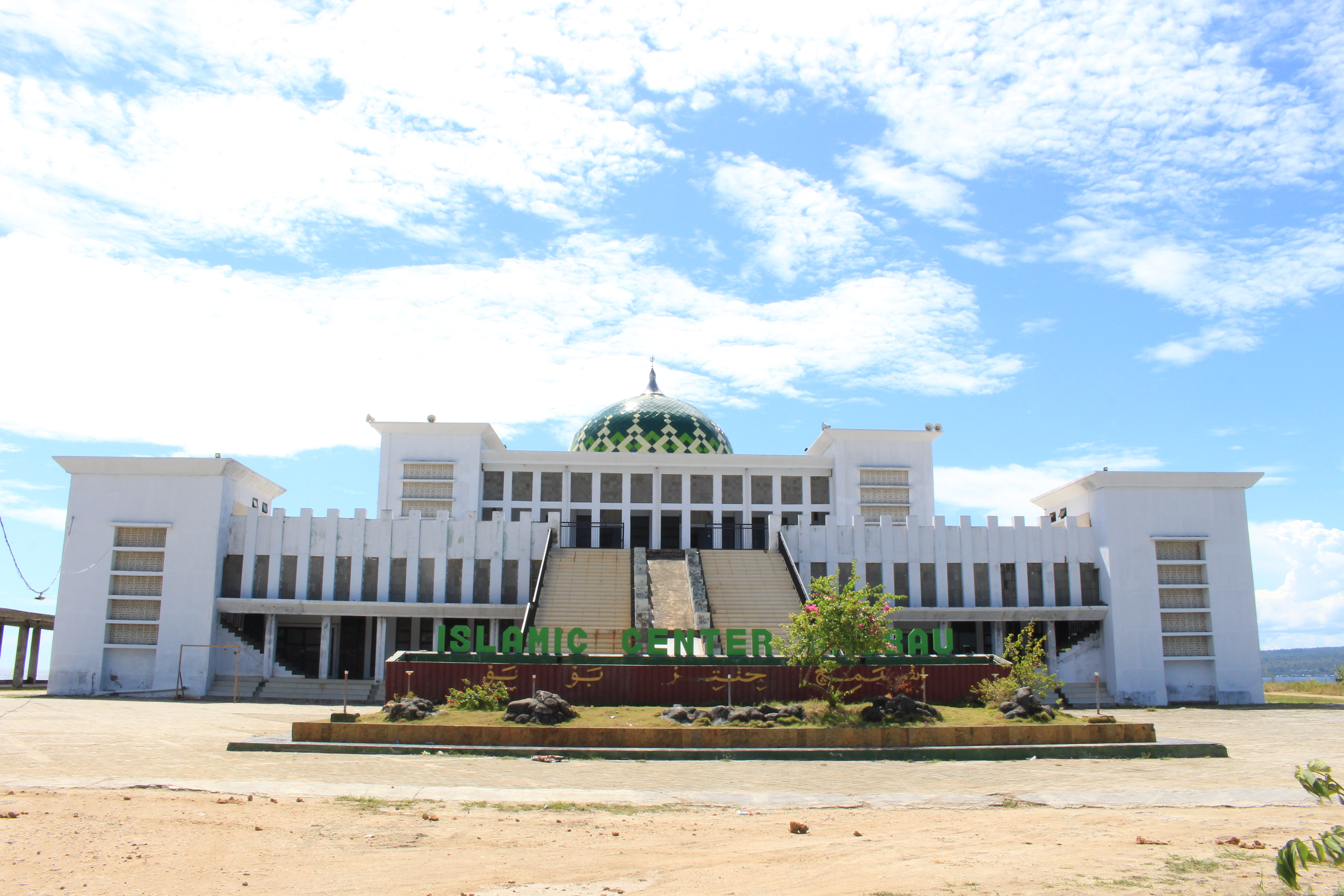
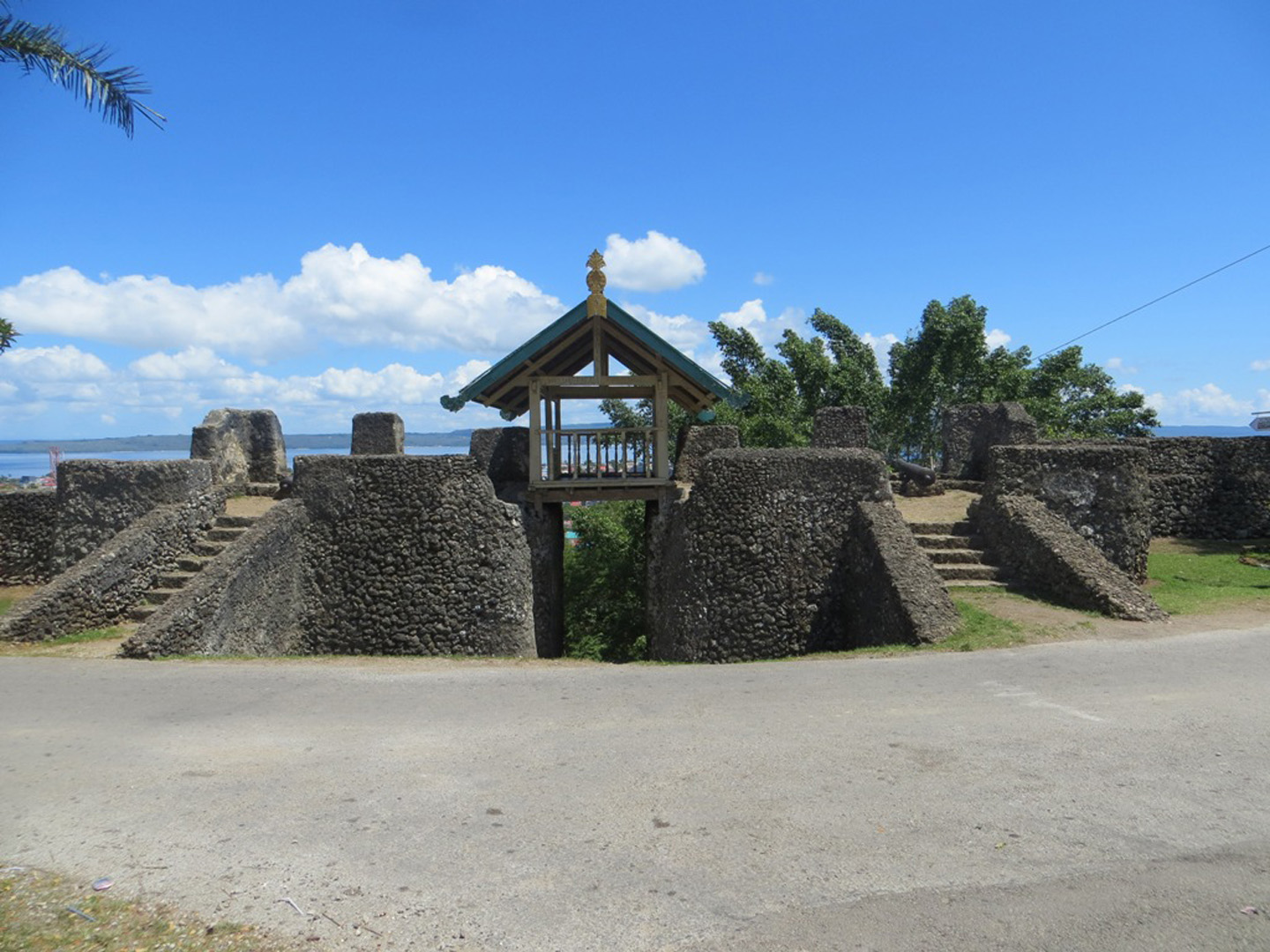
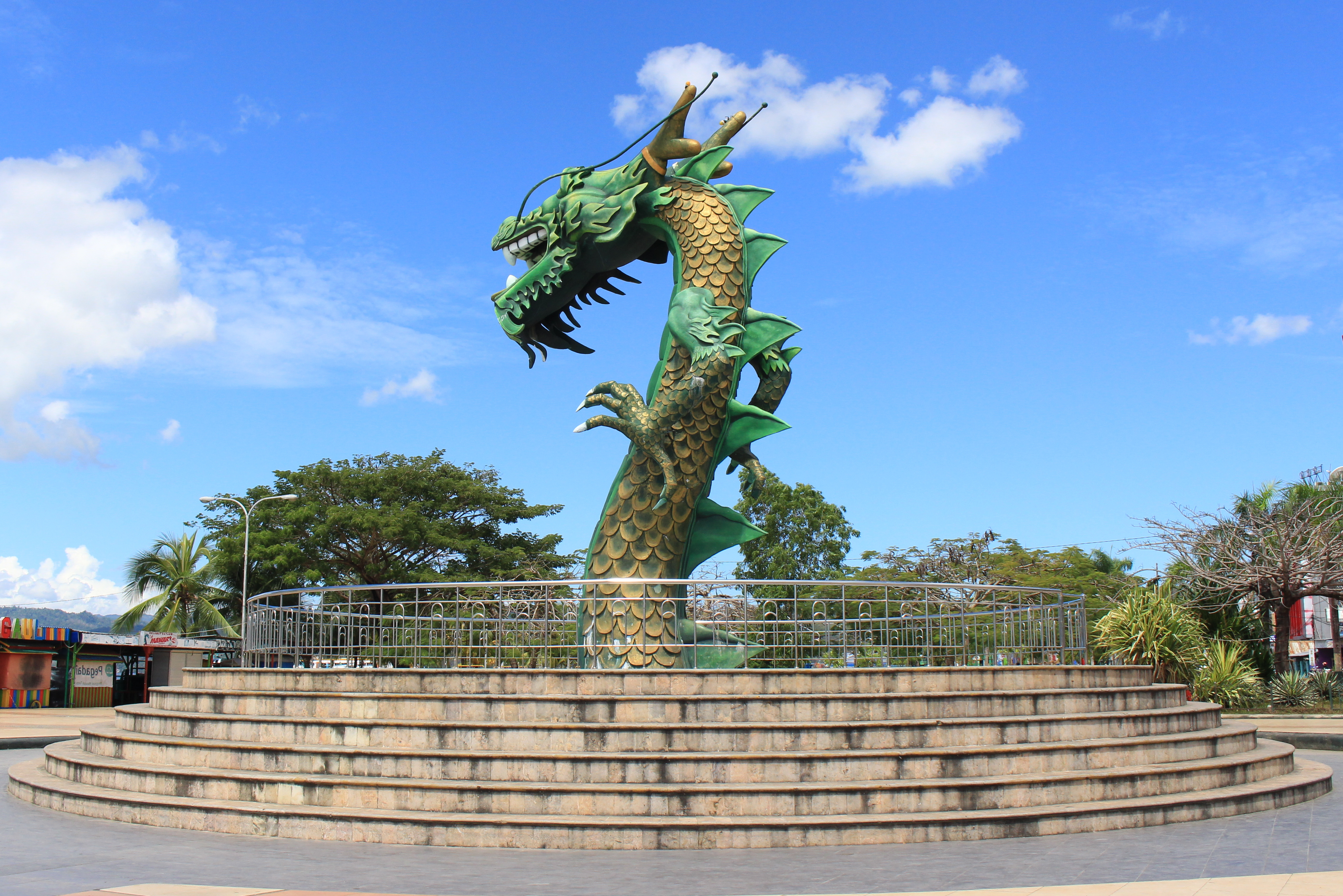
- Clockwise from top: Baubau city waterfront, Buton Palace Fortress, Baubau Dragon Statue, Islamic Center of Baubau

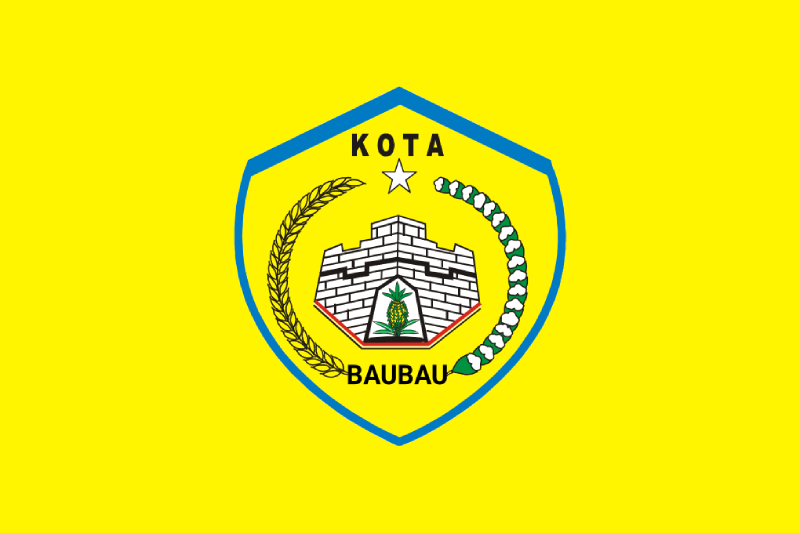
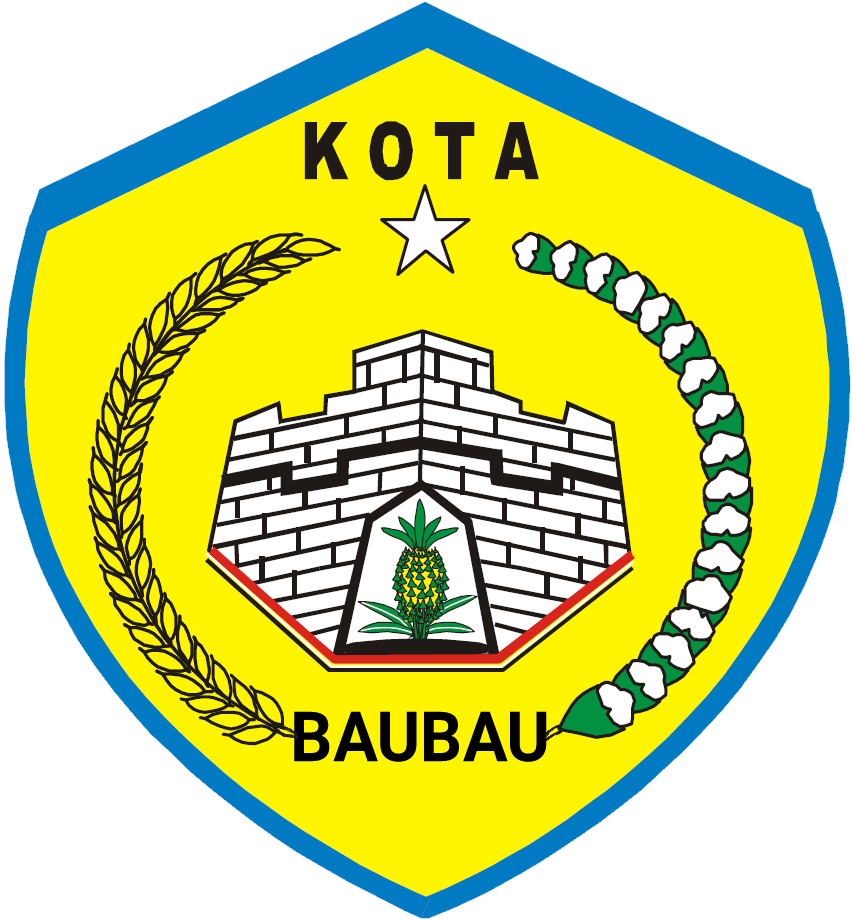
- Flag Coat of arms

- Location within Southeast Sulawesi
- Interactive map of Baubau
- Location in Sulawesi and Indonesia Baubau (Indonesia)
- Coordinates: 5°27′44″S 122°36′21″E
- Country: Indonesia
- Province: Southeast Sulawesi
- City Status: 21 June 2001

Government
  - Mayor: Yusran Fahim
  - Vice Mayor: Wa Ode Hamsinah Bolu

Area
  - Total: 293.87 km^{2} (113.46 sq mi)

Population (2025 estimate)
  - Total: 165,145
  - Density: 561.97/km^{2} (1,455.5/sq mi)
- Time zone: UTC+8 (Indonesia Central Time)
- Area code: (+62) 402
- HDI (2023): ▲0.775 (High)
- Website: baubaukota.go.id

Baubau is a city in Southeast Sulawesi province, Indonesia. The city is located on the southwest coast of Buton island. Baubau attained city status on 21 June 2001 after Law Number 13 of 2001 was passed. It covers an area of 293.87 square kilometres (113.46 sq mi), of which about 30 square kilometres (12 sq mi) is water. It had a population of 136,991 at the 2010 Census and 159,248 at the 2020 Census; the official estimate in mid 2025 was 165,145 (comprising 81,653 males and 83,492 females). The city is the economic center of the Buton Island region and the second-largest city in the province. It was the cultural center of the Butonese people, the former capital of the Sultanate of Buton, the seat of the colonial administration of Eastern Sulawesi (Afdeeling Ost Celebes), and briefly the capital of the entire Southeast Sulawesi regency until 1955 when the capital status shifted to neighbouring Kendari.

== History ==
=== Etymology ===
There are several theories regarding the origin of the city's name. The first traces it to the word "bhaau", a Wolio language word meaning 'new', as the location was a bustling new town under the Sultanate of Buton. Another theory suggests that it came from "bau", a Malay word meaning "to smell", since it was a busy port town with unpleasant-smelling fish markets around the area. A third suggestion descends the word from the Bugis noble title "Andi Bau", as many holders of this title settled in the city after fleeing the first and second Bone Wars.

=== Early and colonial history ===
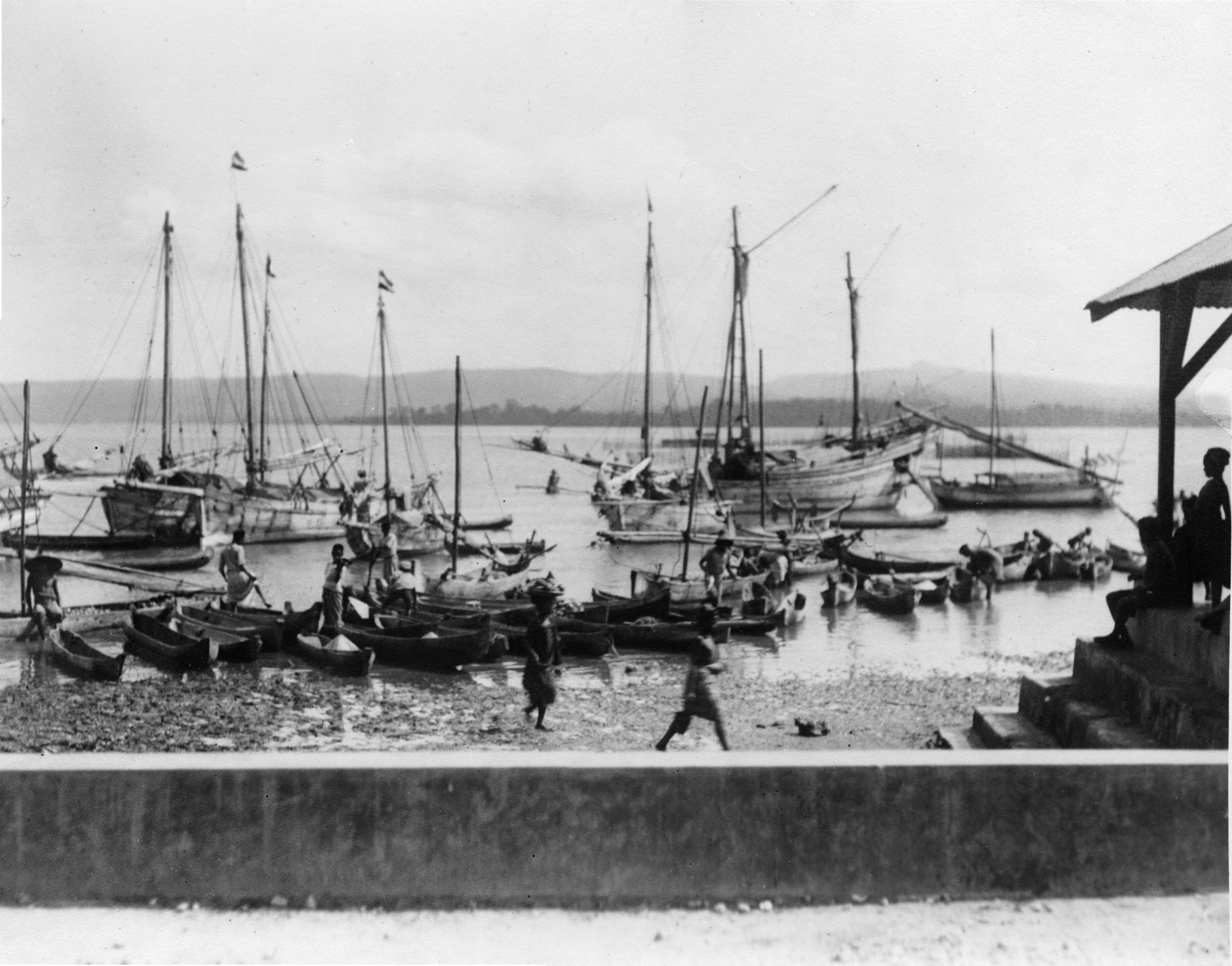
Boats docking around harbour in Baubau, 1920

According to local legends, the city's history started when four groups of Malay merchants in the late 13th century landed on Buton Island. Sipajonga and Simalui landed first on the southern coast and arrived with a banner that would become the banner of the sultanate. Sitamanjo and Sijawangkati followed, landing on the northern coast and eventually moving inland, establishing the area now known as Wolio Fortress, which became the center of governance. These four are collectively known as "mia patamiana" and are said to be the origin of the royal family. The sultanate is said to have been a unification of four villages that later founded the kingdom. Islam spread to the region after a visiting scholar from Johor in the 16th century converted the ruling royals and eventually turned the kingdom into a sultanate with its own constitution called "Murtabat Tujuh". During much of its existence, the political position of the Buton Sultanate was mainpulated by more powerful entities such as Makassar, Ternate, and the Dutch East India Company. It was constantly under threat of invasion by the neighbouring Sultanate of Gowa and of raids by pirate ships from the Sultanate of Ternate, eventually falling under Dutch East India Company protection in the 17th century. A settlement later grew around Wolio Fortress and the palace complex that eventually become Baubau city.

In 1911, under the Dutch colonial government, the city became the capital of Afdeeling Oost Celebes, and the governance of the whole eastern Sulawesi region was consolidated to the city. As a result, the city grew in administrative importance and received modern infrastructure such as sealed roads, telephones, and military installments. The development of the city's infrastructure was modeled after Sibolga and was tailored to help fight the spread of malaria due to the region's swampy nature. This development was followed by economic expansion to the rest of Buton Island, starting with the opening of an asphalt mine in 1924. The asphalt was then used to construct inland roads to an economically important part of the island where there were coconut plantations and harvesting of forest goods such as rattan. During this time, the city also saw the founding of migrant quarters such as Kampung Bone and Kampung Wajo. Baubau acted as Southeast Sulawesi's main port, local goods hub, and main market town.

=== Recent history ===
Baubau's economic importance declined following Indonesian independence, as the country's political power shifted from the sultanate to local figures and politicians. A local parliament was formed, with an election taking place in 1955, in which Masyumi and the Indonesian National Party gained the most seats (six and five respectively). The local parliament had already met in an ethnic Chinese school building in the city on 21 July 1953 and consisted of members appointed prior to the election.

Between 1952's Law Number 34 and 1955, the city was the capital of the Southeast Sulawesi Regency (today corresponding to Southeast Sulawesi province). The regency was later divided into Buton Regency, Kendari Regency, Kolaka Regency, and Muna Regency, whose seats were Baubau, Kendari, Kolaka, and Raha, respectively. When Southeast Sulawesi province formed, Kendari replaced Baubau as the capital, resulting in the latter becoming less relevant economically and politically. Despite the creation of the province being the result of popular demand, the vision was initially that Baubau would become the capital; hence, the decision to choose Kendari was seen as betrayal of the original plan for the province. The decision to choose Kendari instead of Baubau was both the result of the city's losing a public vote against Kendari, 45–27, and of an incident where the city drafted two budgets produced by two different officials at the same time, creating dualism in the city's bureaucracy. Both cities also experienced an influx of refugees in the 1950s due to the Darul Islam rebellion. People from outside of the cities were evacuated to camps within the city, with kidnappings of civilians by Darul Islam forces commonplace until the following decade.

Baubau was granted city status in 2001 following the fall of Suharto and consequent decentralization across Indonesia, separating itself from Buton Regency. Residents of Buton later demanded the creation of a new Buton Islands Province with Baubau as the capital, which would separate the regency from the rest of Southeast Sulawesi. The creation of this province was supported by the governor of Southeast Sulawesi and the Regional Representative Council, but did not go ahead due to a moratorium on creating new autonomous regions under the presidency of Joko Widodo.

== Geography ==
Geographically, Baubau lies between latitude 5.21°S and 5.33°S and longitude 122.30°E and 122.47°E, and is located in the southern part of Southeast Sulawesi province. Baubau is bordered to the north by the Buton Strait (between Buton Island and Muna Island), to the east and south by the Buton Regency districts Kapontori and Pasarwajo, and to the west by South Buton Regency's Kadatua District.

The topographical condition of Baubau consists mostly of mountains and hills above a long coast. Long hills stretch above the surrounding terrain with the variation of altitude between 0 and 100 meters above mean sea level. Baubau has a land slope of up to 40%. The dominant soil types in the city are cambisol, podzol, and latosol. Soils in the city and the rest of Buton Island are not fertile and are relatively unsuitable for large-scale farming. Similar to other Indonesian cities, Baubau has tropical weather. The day and night temperatures typically vary from 29 to 33 °C during the day and 20 to 29 °C at night.

The city area includes seven small offshore islands, six in Lea-Lea District and one in Kokalukuma District.

== Governance ==
=== Administrative division ===
The city is divided into eight districts (kecamatan), tabulated below with their areas and their populations as of the 2010 Census and the 2020 Census, together with the official estimates as of mid 2025. The city was previously divided into four districts: Betoambari, which had an area of 34.34 square kilometres (13.26 sq mi); Wolio, which had an area of 26.77 square kilometres (10.34 sq mi); Sorawolio, which had an area of 82.25 square kilometres (31.76 sq mi); and Bungi, which had an area of 76.64 square kilometres (29.59 sq mi). At the time, Murhum, Kokalukuna, and Lea-Lea were incorporated within Betoambari, Wolio, and Bungi, while Batupoato was later cut out of Murhum. The table includes the locations of the district administrative centres, the number of administrative villages (all classed as urban kelurahan) in each district, and their postcodes.

Kode Wilayah	Name of district (kecamatan)	Area in km^{2}	Pop'n Census 2010	Pop'n Census 2020	Pop'n Estimate mid 2025	Admin centre	No. of villages	Post codes
74.72.01	Betoambari	31.60	16,283	22,434	23,132	Katobengke	5	93721, 93724 & 93725
74.72.06	Murhum	5.98	19,261	20,021	21,282	Lamangga	5	93721, 93725 - 93727
74.72.08	Batupoaro	1.88	25,889	26,733	27,154	Wameo	6	93728
74.72.02	Wolio	24.38	37,974	43,342	45,000	Wangkanapi	7	93711–93715, 93717
74.72.05	Kokalukuna (Note: Including the offshore islet of Pulau Makassar)	17.51	16,736	20,992	21,153	Waruruma	6	93711, 93716, 93719
74.72.03	Sorawolio	103.76	7,122	8,826	9,164	Kaisabu Baru	4	93731
74.72.04	Bungi (Note: Including the offshore islets of Pulau Batukapal and Pulau Batusori)	75.79	7,096	8,381	8,875	Liabuku	5	93732
74.72.07	Lea-Lea	32.97	6,630	8,519	9,385	Kantalai	5	93733
	Totals	293.87	136,991	159,248	165,145	Betoambari	43	

=== Government and politics ===
As with all Indonesian cities, Baubau is a second-level administrative division run by a mayor and vice mayor together with the city parliament, and has a status equivalent to a regency. Executive power lies with the mayor and vice mayor, while legislative duties are carried out by local parliaments. The mayor, vice mayor, and parliament members are democratically elected by the people of the city in elections. The heads of districts are appointed directly by the mayor, with recommendations by the city secretary.

The city is part of the 4th Southeast Sulawesi electoral district, together with Buton Regency, Wakatobi Regency, Central Buton Regency, and South Buton Regency, which together send 10 representatives to the 45-seat provincial parliament. For city elections, the city is divided into three electoral districts with 25 seats. The last election was in 2024 and the next one is planned for 2029. Below listed inside the table are the electoral districts in the city with their respective amount of seats.

Electoral district	Region	Representatives
Baubau 1st	Batupoaro, Betoambari, and Murhum	11
Baubau 2nd	Wolio	7
Baubau 3rd	Bungi, Kokalukuna, Lea-Lea, and Sorawolio	7
Total		25

=== Military ===
The city is the headquarters of Kodim 1413 / Buton, which oversees territorial defense of the entire Buton Island. It has been part of Korem 143 / Haluoleo under Kodam XIV / Hasanuddin since 2017, when the larger Kodam VII / Wirabuana was dissolved.

== Economy ==
Baubau's gross regional domestic product (GRDP) in 2023 was valued at 7.449 trillion rupiah. The largest contributors to the city's economy that year were its trade and retail, construction, and agriculture sectors, which consisted of 21.44%, 21.01%, and 15.60% of the city's GRDP. Its fastest-growing sector was its service sector, which grew by 11.05% between 2022 and 2023, and its fastest-declining sector was manufacturing, which declined by more than 22%. Economic growth of the overall city in 2023 was 3.38%, a decrease from the previous year's 5.28%.

=== Agriculture and fisheries ===
The city's agriculture centers are Bungi, Sorawalio, and Lea-Lea districts, which between them have 59.6% of the city's registered agriculture business. In 2023, the city's most produced commodities were papaya and jackfruit, with the city producing 3,610 and 2,143 tonnes respectively, with high quantities of pineapple, tangerine, and dragon fruit also being produced. Around 1,300 hectares of the city were allocated for rice fields, however, many of these were underutilized and often abandoned by its farmers due to the soil being unsuitable for large-scale rice farming. The city also has significant seaweed farming output, exporting 4,914 tonnes in 2022, and fishing boats around the city catch decapterus fish, anchovies, mackerel tuna, and skipjack tuna. In addition, Baubau is a center of fish processing from nearby regions and processed around 10,000 tonnes of fish that were frozen and re-exported elsewhere in 2021. The city planned to establish a shrimp aquaculture industry within the city in 2023.

=== Tourism and service sector ===
The city's tourism and service sector contributed around 1.21% to the city's economy. Baubau contains 50 registered hotels, 177 registered restaurant businesses, eight designated public market buildings, and 1,559 registered warungs. In 2023, the city was visited by 108,329 domestic tourists and 289 foreign tourists. The city has 3,458 registered small and micro industries in 2020, which employed 8,148 people that year.

=== Other industries ===
There are 81 registered cooperatives in the city as of 2023, according to Statistics Indonesia. There are several bank branches present in the city such as Bank Rakyat Indonesia, Bank Negara Indonesia, and Sultra Bank. The city's main port, Murhum Port, aside from being used for fisheries, is also expected to support asphalt industries from nearby Buton Regency. About 28,000 people from the city participated in economic activities related to or within small enterprises and microindustries that existed within the city in 2023.

== Demographics ==
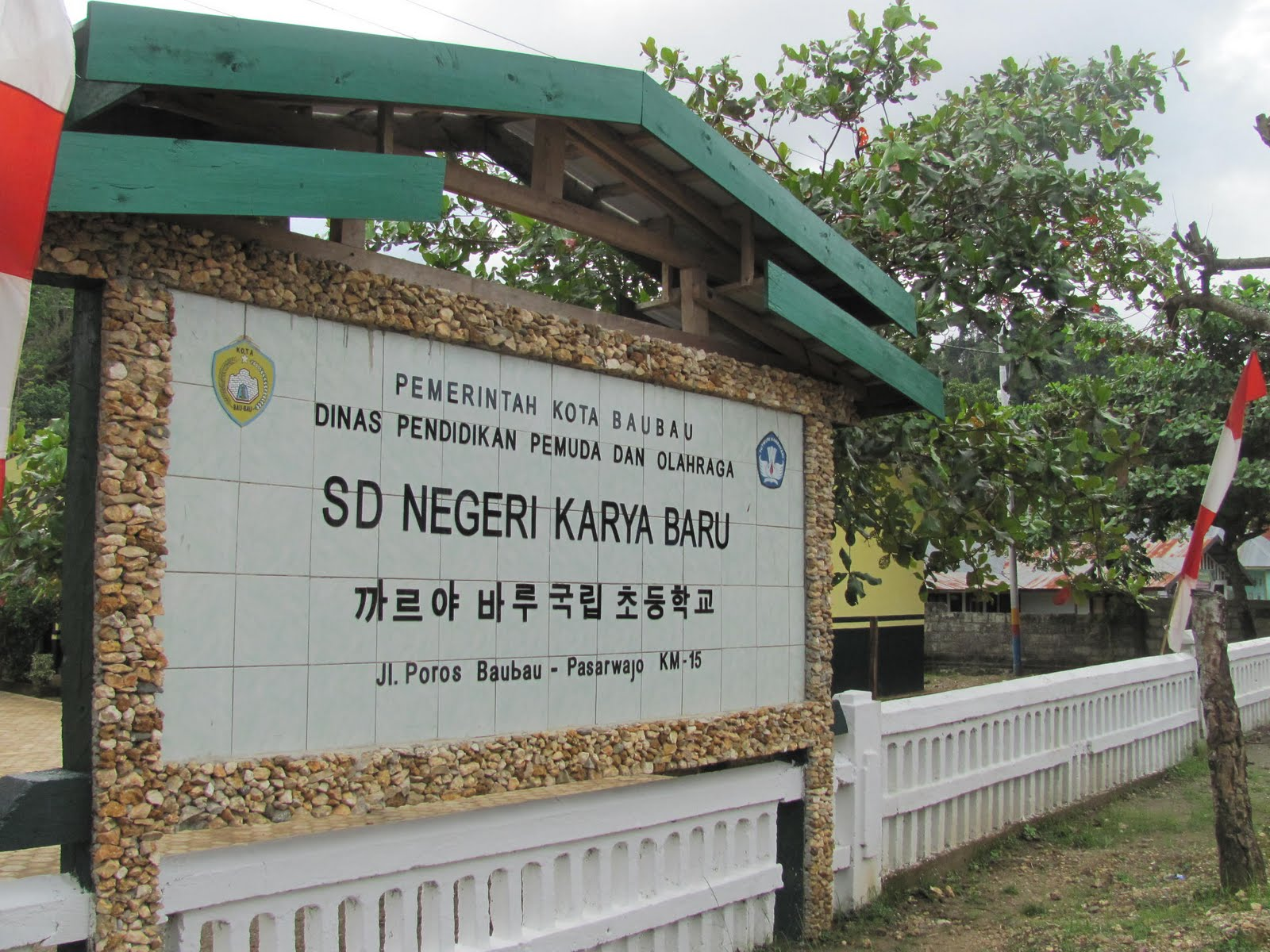
A public school in Baubau with sign written in both Latin and Hangul. The city saw short-lived effort to use Hangul for writing regional language

The most populous district in the city is Wolio district, which contained 27% of the city's population in 2023. This was followed by Batupoaro district with 17%, and Betoambari, Murhum, and Kokalukuna districts, with 13% each. The remaining 17% were distributed among other three districts (Lea-lea, Bungi, and Sorawolio). The average population growth of the city in 2023 was 1.18%, with Bungli district seeing 3.34% growth, Lea-Lea 3.20%, Betoambari 2.98%, Wolio 0.88%, Sorawolio 0.75%, Murhum 0.65%, Batupoaro 0.33%, and Kokalukuna 0.06%. The city's sex ratio was 98.45 males for every 100 females in 2023, with some districts such as Lea-Lea and Bungli having more males and other districts such as Wolio and Murhum having more females. The city's most densely populated district is Batupoaro with 16,161 people per square kilometre, followed by Murhum (3,403/km^{2}), Wolio (1,283/km^{2}), Kokalukuna (1,244/km^{2}), Betoambari (644/km^{2}), Lea-lea (277/km^{2}), Bungi (149/km^{2}), and Sorawolio (82/km^{2}).

Out of Baubau's total population of 161,280 in 2023, 84,185 were classified as economically active, with the city's unemployment rate that year being 2.17%, according to Statistics Indonesia. The population pyramid of the city was dominated by those between age 14 to 34 years old in 2021. The religious demography of the city is dominated by Muslims with 96.65%, followed by Hindu as the second largest religion with 1.64%, Protestantism with 0.99%, Catholicism with 0.37%, and Buddhism with 0.05%, according to data from late 2021. The literacy rate in the city as of 2023 was 97.52%. Baubau's national language is Indonesian, while its major regional language is Wolio, which was the official language of the Sultanate and is still taught in schools. The city is also home to other regional languages of Buton, such as Cia-Cia which gained international attention when its users tried to use the Korean Hangul script to create a written version of their language. Most of the city's inhabitants are Butonese, with a minority of Buginese, Moluccans, Javanese, and Sundanese migrants from other parts of Indonesia.

== Education ==
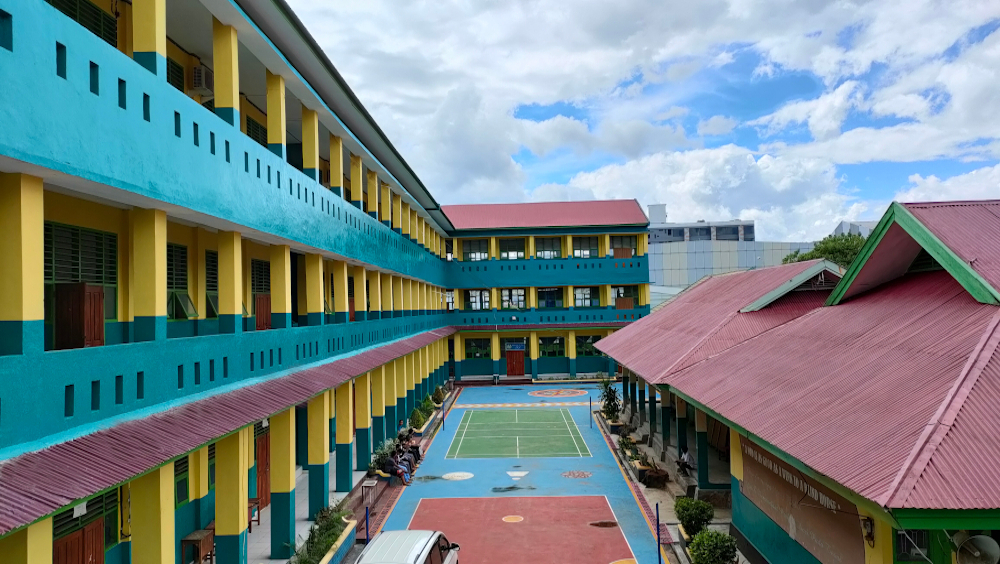
A junior high school in Baubau

The city has 110 kindergartens, 80 elementary schools, 38 junior high schools, 18 senior high schools, eight vocational high schools, and five tertiary education institutions registered in the city, according to Statistics Indonesia. Universities in the city include Buton Muhammadiyah University, a private university run by Muhammadiyah, as well as Baubau Polytechnic and Dayanu Ikhsanuddin University. All universities and colleges in the city are private.

== Healthcare ==
The city has seven hospitals, three polyclinics, 26 puskesmas, and 23 registered pharmacies. Of the seven hospitals, four are general hospitals. Of the 26 puskesmas, five have inpatient care. One of the hospitals, Baubau City Regional General Hospital, is a public hospital managed by the city government and classified by the Ministry of Healthcare as C-class hospital. The rest of the hospitals are private, including one operated by Siloam Hospitals.

== Culture and entertainment ==
=== Butonese culture ===
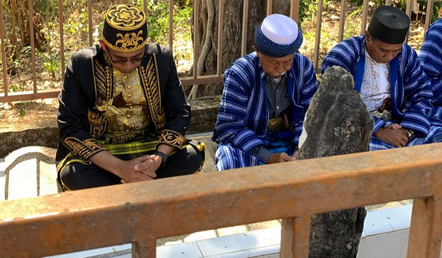
Sultan of Buton praying to a grave in Baubau

As the city was the capital of the Buton Sultanate, it retains many of the old sultanate's events and ethnic processions. A mix of Islamic influences and local cultures can be seen in celebrations such as Haroana Maludhu, which celebrates Mawlid, led by the sultan in the royal palace complex and attended by Butonese people. The procession lasts around a month and ends with an event celebrated inside the Buton royal mosque. Another event, Haroana Rajabu, involves the Butonese people praying to their dead ancestors on the fourth Friday of the month of Rajab. Aside from Islam-related events, many other events and processions take place, several of which are related to the sea. These include Tuturangina Andala, to ward off bad weather or disaster while seaborne, Harona Andala, to wish for success while fishing, and Phalantoana Bhangka, to inaugurate newly built ships made by local workshops.

=== City parks ===
The city hosts several urban parks; one of the most prominent is Kotamara Park, which is located on the city's waterfront facing the sea. Built in 2010, the park was constructed on top of reclaimed land in Batupoaro district. Hutan Pinus Samparona, an urban forest in Sorawolio district, is also a popular location with locals for hangouts and selfies. It is managed jointly by the city government and private investors. Another park, Bukit Kaluku Park, was built in 2019 as part of a slum-upgrading project by the city. The park itself is located close to Kaluku Beach and has a direct view of Murhum Port. There is also another park located close to a different beach within the city called Kamali Park. A park located close to Wameo Market is used by vendors and hawkers in addition to its park function, while BRI Park near the city center was planned in 2022 to be a center for small businesses. In 2012, the city has total of 1,192 hectares of land classified as city parks.

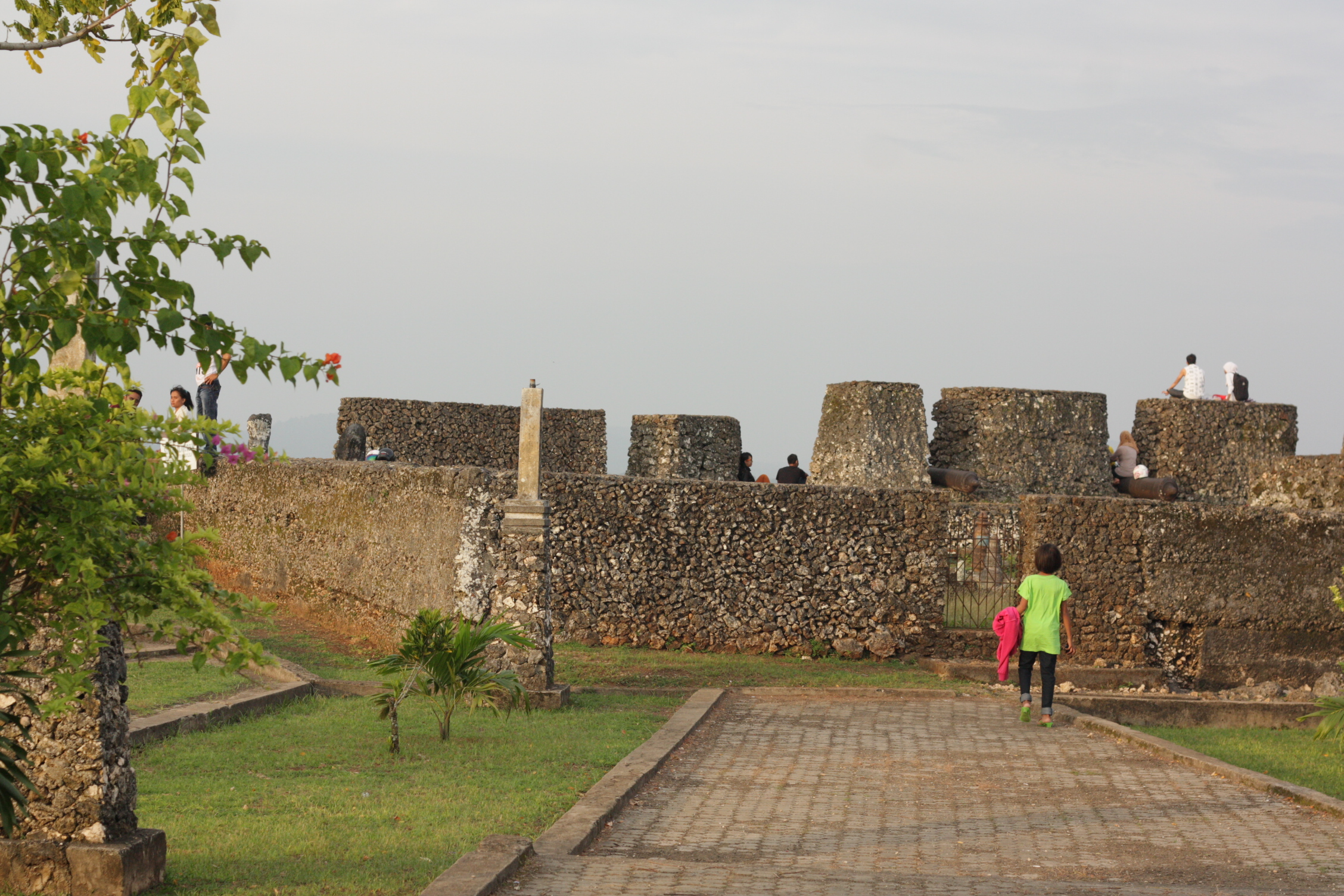
Walls of Wolio Fortress in Baubau

=== Historical sites ===
The most prominent historical site in the city is Buton Palace Fortress, sometimes known as Wolio Fortress, which contains a royal complex. It was constructed around the 16th century, starting during the reign of Sultan La Sangaji and ending under Sultan La Buke. In local folk legend, the fortress's construction was so time-consuming that subjects who took part were unable to work elsewhere, and the siolimbona, the sultanate's legislative body, threatened to impeach the sultan who insisted on continuing it. Due to the presence of this fortress and several others around the city, Baubau is nicknamed the "city of thousand fortresses". These fortresses, including Wolio, were all built using carved coral reefs and limestone and were used as the main defense infrastructure of the sultanate. Fortresses were so ubiquitous a part of the sultanate's infrastructure that the Wolio language word for "fortress" is synonymous with "city", and every single kadie (administrative division of Sultanate of Buton) had at least one fortress built on it. The fortress itself and the complex inside of it were declared to be cultural heritage by Indonesia's Ministry of Education, who granted it legal protection. It is also the largest fortress in the Indonesian archipelago by land area, at 22.8 hectares, and has a circumference of 2,740 meters. The fortress has a trench of around 1.5 kilometers in length which is divided into several parts for defensive purposes. Each part (baluara) of the fortress, is divided by internal walls and armed with cannons. It also has twelve gates (lawa) scattered around the fortress's outer layer. The inner part of the fortress is an old settlement complex said to have been founded by migrants from Johor and divided into limbo, each of which had administrative functions and a royal official. Inside this part is the royal mosque, built in 1712. The fortress also contains a 21-meter wooden flagpole, traditionally called kasulana tombi, which was built that year and is thought by Indonesian historians to be the oldest flagpole in the world still standing. In 1871, the flagpole was struck by lightning, resulting in parts of it being replaced. In 2020, due to its old age and to prevent further damage, the flagpole was reinforced by the city government with additional supports and a protective structure made of iron.

Certain parts of the city, especially around Balai Kota Street, contain colonial-era buildings, with their design resembling Art Deco style. A former colonial resident office building, a former house of the Royal Netherlands East Indies Army officer, a colonial-era post office, and the town square (today called Merdeka Square) are located along this street. According to the Dutch administration, the spatial planning around this area with a central town square was a common feature of indigenous Muslim towns; the area was then reinforced for better surveillance and management of the natives' activities. The Dutch also constructed a garden, called Keboen Raja, with a fountain at the intersection of Kartini Street and Sudirman Street. Today, only the fountain is left; the rest of the garden was converted into a landfill. Other colonial-era buildings included several palaces and residences constructed by the Dutch for the Buton sultans and royal family members. In addition to buildings built by the Dutch administration, the city also has a Chinatown area consisting of shophouses and old commercial buildings built by ethnic Chinese who immigrated during the 19th and 20th centuries.

The area's more recent historical buildings, dating back to the early independence era in 1950s, include a housing complex for new civil servants dating to 1952. Baubau also includes the Galangi Monument, a monument of a figure wearing galangi, Butonese traditional wear, with their hand pointing to the port. In total, there are 51 historical objects dating back to this era noted; most are managed or protected by the city's Culture and Tourism Department, though others lack documentation.

=== Others ===
Baubau has one stadium, called Betoambari Stadium, mainly for association football and large ceremonies. In 2021, the stadium was renovated with FIFA-standard grass. The city is home to Persibau Baubau, an Indonesian football club playing in Liga 3. The city also has other sports venues such as GOR Badminton Baubau for badminton, and several futsal fields, basketball, and volleyball courts, such as those in Murhum district, and the Lowu-Lowu Public Swimming Pool. The Islamic Center of Baubau is located in Wameo subdistrict in Murhum district and is often visited by religious tourists.

== Transportation ==
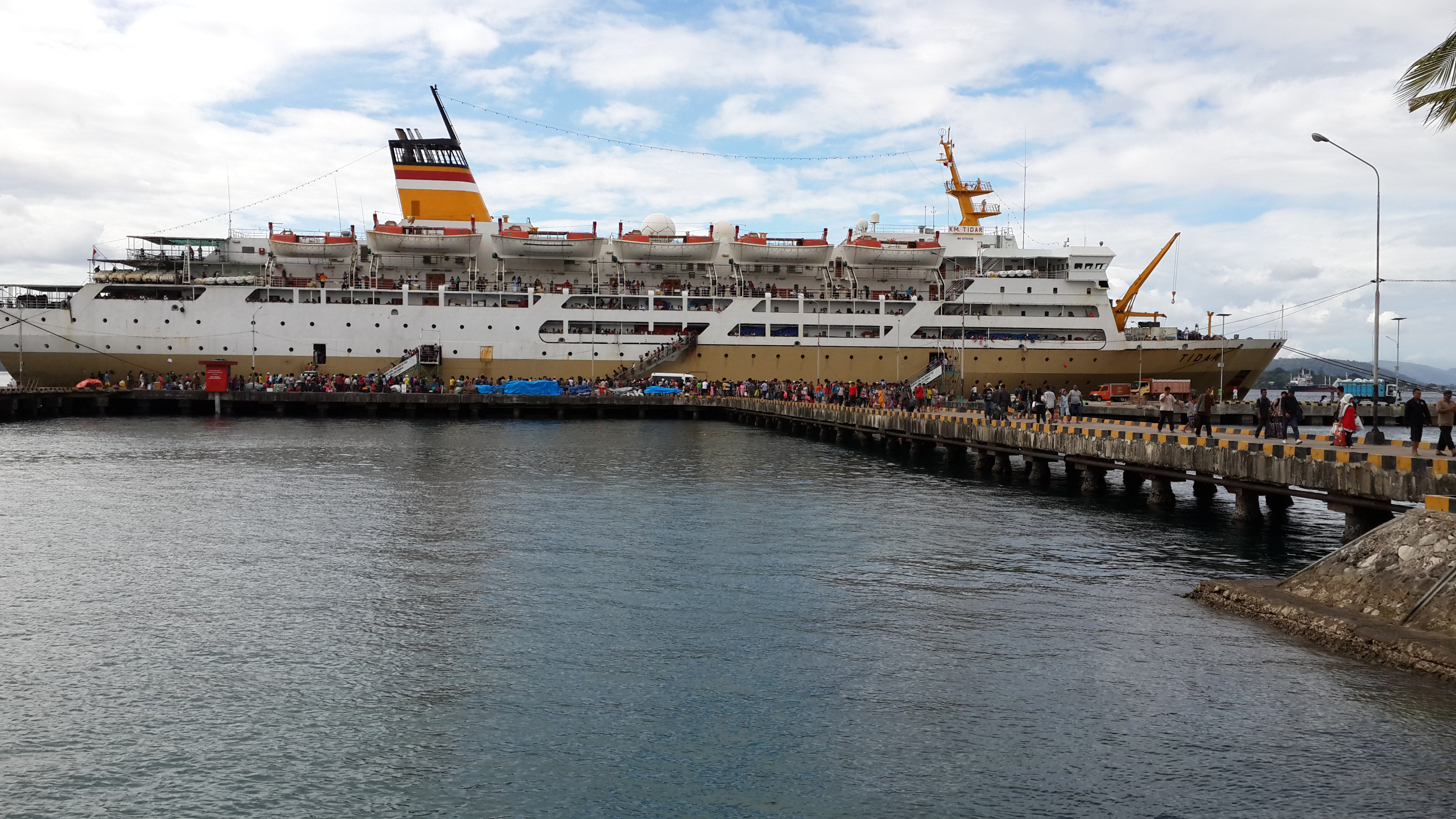
Passenger ship docked in Baubau

The city has a total road length of 472.3 kilometers, most of which are roads managed by the city government. National roads in the city comprise 53.4 kilometers of this total, while provincial roads comprise 9.5 kilometers. Around 316 kilometres of the road are paved with asphalt, while the rest are of varying quality, including gravel and soil, as of 2023. The city's main roads connect to other major towns on the island such as Pasarwajo and Ereke. Baubau also has a ring road under construction, which is expected to be finished by late 2024. The city's public transportation, as in most Indonesian cities, relies mostly on angkots with routes regulated by the local government, complemented by ride-hailing services such as Gojek and auto rickshaws. In recent years, the number of angkots have declined due to ride-hailing services putting some angkot owners out of business after outcompeting them.

Being located on an island, water transport is an integral part of city's transportation system to other islands or mainland Sulawesi. This service is provided primarily by Pelni and Sea Toll Program. There was a plan to connect Buton Island to Muna Island via a bridge from Baubau, however, this plan was put on hold indefinitely in 2023. The city is served by Betoambari Airport with regular flights to Makassar, Wakatobi Regency, and Kendari.
