= Buton Palace Fortress =

Palatial Fortress in Indonesia

Coordinates: 5°28′29″S 122°36′06″E

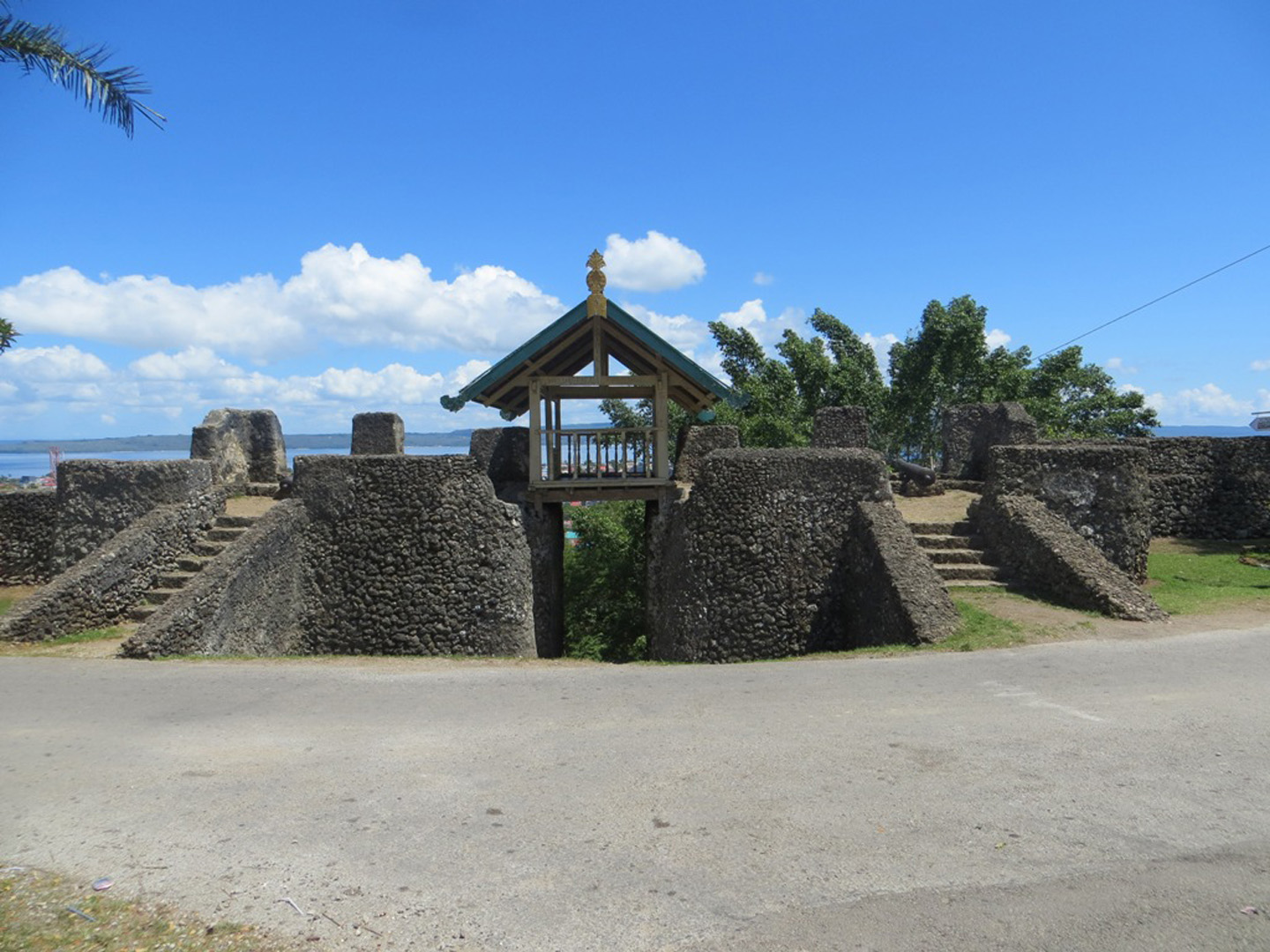
- Wolio Pallace Fortress

- Location within Indonesia

General information
- Location: Baubau, Indonesia
- Coordinates: 5°28'29"S 122°36'06"E
- Construction started: Late 16th century
- Completed: Late 16th century

Technical details
- Structural system: Stone built Palatial fort
- Size: 23,375 hectares.

Buton Palace Fortress, originally the Wolio Palace, is a late 16th century palatial fortress located in Baubau, Southeast Sulawesi. The palace was built in the late 16th century for Sultan Buton III, La Sangaji titled Sultan Kaimuddin (1591-1596) and was the residence of the Buton Sultanate. Heritage performances are given inside the fortress.

== History ==
Buton Palace Fort was built in the 16th century by Sultan Buton III named La Sangaji, titled Sultan Kaimuddin (1591-1596). Initially, the fort was only built in the form of a pile of stones arranged around the palace complex with the aim of making a fence between the palace complex and the community as well as a defensive castle. During the reign of Sultan Buton IV named La Elangi or Sultan Dayanu Ikhsanuddin, the fort in the form of a pile of stones was made a permanent building.

During the Golden age of the Sultanate of Buton, the existence of the Fort of the Palace of Buton gave a great influence on the existence of the Kingdom. In more than four centuries, the Sultanate of Buton was able to survive and avoid the threat of enemies.

== Description ==
This fort consists of three components namely Badili, Lawa, and Baluara The circular fort with a circumference of 2,740 meters. The Buton Palace Fortress received awards from the Indonesian World Records Museum (MURI) and the Guinness Book Record, which was issued in September 2006 as the largest castle in the world with an area of about 23,375 hectares.

This fort has 12 gates called Lawa and 16 emplacement cannons which they call Baluara. Because it is located at the top of a high hill with a fairly steep slope allows this place as the best defense place in its day. From the edge of the fort, which still stands firmly, you can enjoy the view of the city of Bau-Bau and back and forth ships in the Strait of Buton clearly from a height, a sight that is quite frightening. In addition, in the fort area, various historical relics of the Sultanate of Buton can be found. Initially, the fort was only built in the form of a pile of stones arranged around the palace complex with the aim of making a fence between the palace complex and the community as well as a defensive castle. During the reign of Sultan Buton IV named La Elangi or Sultan Dayanu Ikhsanuddin, the fort in the form of a pile of stones was made a permanent building.

=== Badili (Cannon) ===
The Badili is a cannon made of scrap metal measuring 2 to 3 depa (about 180 cm). This cannon is a former weapon of the Sultanate of Buton, a relic of the Portuguese and Dutch, which can be found in almost all fortifications in the city of Bau-Bau.

=== Lawa ===
In Wolio means the gate. Lawa functions as a liaison between the palace and the villages around the palace fort. There are 12 lawa in the palace fort. Number 12 according to public belief represents the number of holes in the human body, so that the castle fort is likened to the human body. The 12 lawa has each name in accordance with the title of the person watching it, the mention of the lawa strung by its name. The word lawa is imbued with the suffix 'na' to 'lawana'. The suffix 'na' in Buton functions as a substitute for the word "it". Each lawa has a different shape but in general can be distinguished both the shape, width and construction are made of stone and also combined with wood, a kind of gazebo on it that functions as an observation tower. 12 Lawa names include: lawana rakia, lawana lanto, lawana labunta, lawana kampebuni, lawana waborobo, lawana dete, lawana if, lawana wajo / bariya, lawana badene / tanailandu, lawana melai / baau, lawana lantongau and lawana gundu-gundu.

=== Baluara ===
The word baluara is derived from the Portuguese language baluer which means bastion. Baluara was built before the castle fort was founded in 1613 during the reign of La Elangi / Dayanu Ikhsanuddin (the fourth buton sultan) together with the construction of 'godo' (warehouse). Of the 16 baluara, two of them have Godo which is located above the baluara. Each serves as a storage area for bullets and gunpowder. Each fund has a different shape, adapted to the conditions of the land and place. Baluara are named after the village where they are located. The name of the village was inside the palace fort at the time of the Sultanate of Buton.16 Baluara names are: baluarana gama, baluarana litao, baluarana barangkatopa, baluarana wandailolo, baluarana baluwu, baluarana dete, baluarana if, baluarana godona oba, baluarana wajo / bariya, baluarana tanailandu, baluarana melai / baau, baluarana godona batu, baluarana lantongau, baluarana melai / baau, baluarana godona batu, baluarana lantongau, Baluarana gundu, Baluarana siompu and Baluarana rakia.
