= Sultanate of Buton =

Former sultanate in Indonesia

- 1332–1960
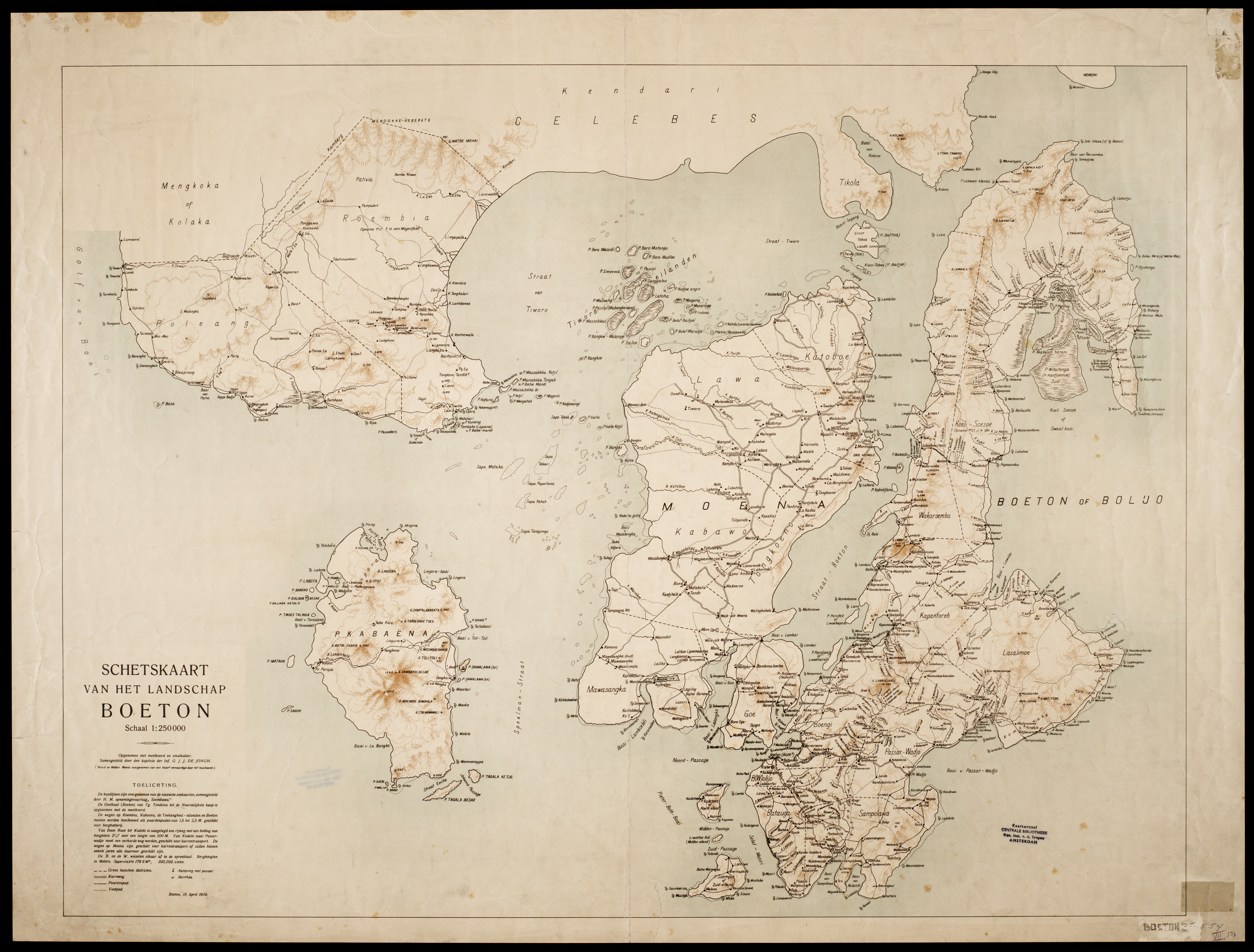
- Location of the Sultanate of Buton in green Map of the Landschap of Buton (Sultanate of Buton) in 1916.
- Capital: Baubau
- Common languages: Wolio, Cia-cia, Moronene
- Religion: Islam, Animism
- Government: Constitutional monarchy
- Yang Mulia Mahaguru
- History
  - Established: 1332
  - Asyikin–Brugman Treaty: 1906
  - Disestablished: 1960
- Today part of: Indonesia

The Sultanate of Buton was an indigenous sultanate in what is today Indonesia. It used to rule over Buton island and adjacent areas within present-day Southeast Sulawesi province. It was a constitutional monarchy with its own written constitution and law, complete with bodies acting as a legislature, a system of judiciary, and executive power.

== Early history ==
The islands that comprised the sultanate's territory were called Liwuto Pataanguna, meaning "Four Islands". People from the Buton Islands were called tukang besi, literally meaning "blacksmith". There are several versions of how people there were named this way, one from an oral story of a Dutch man who arrived on the islands and was surprised to find almost everyone using iron tools, hence he named it Toekang Besi Eilanden. Another version suggests that it was from another kingdom within the region named the kingdom of Tukabessi.

The Islands of Buton were mentioned in the Nagarakretagama and the Palapa oath, suggesting that the islands were once under the influence of Majapahit. Initially, the kingdom was believed have been founded by Mia Patamiana (the four people) named Sipanjonga, Simalui, Sitamanajo, and Sijawangkati from the Malay Peninsula. They founded the settlement named Wolio (today part of Baubau city) and formed the traditional four small regions called Limbo consisting of Gundu-gundu, Barangkatopa, Peropa, and Baluwu. Each was led by a bonto which later known as patalimbona. These four Limbo along with the other small kingdoms of Tobe-tobe, Kamaru, Wabula, Todanga, and Batauga, joined together and elected the first ruler around the 1300s, named Wa Kaa kaa (that sister) . She was married to Si Batara, believed to be of Majapahit descent. Before the kingdom converted to Islam. The first king that converted to Islam was King La Kilaponto, later renamed Sultan Murhum Kaimuddin Khalifatul Khamis after his conversion an ascension in Buton. The Kingdom of Buton officially converted to Islam under his reign, with the help of a scholar from the Johor Sultanate. This person is believed to be the same person as La Kilaponto ruler of Muna Kingdom, La Tolaki mokole (ruler) of Konawe, as well as the figure of Halu Oleo.

The sultanate came under Dutch administration in the aftermath of Asyikin–Brugman Treaty.

== Constitutional monarchy ==
Unlike other kingdoms and sultanates in the region, the Sultanate of Buton was a constitutional monarchy. The constitution was written and named Murtabat Tujuh. This constitution was formalized by Sultan La Elangi (1597–1631) and did not change much until the sultanate was abolished.

== Legacy ==
During the 16th century, the city of Baubau had heavy fortifications which today is the Buton Palace Fortress, a popular tourist attraction in the region.
