= First Bone War =

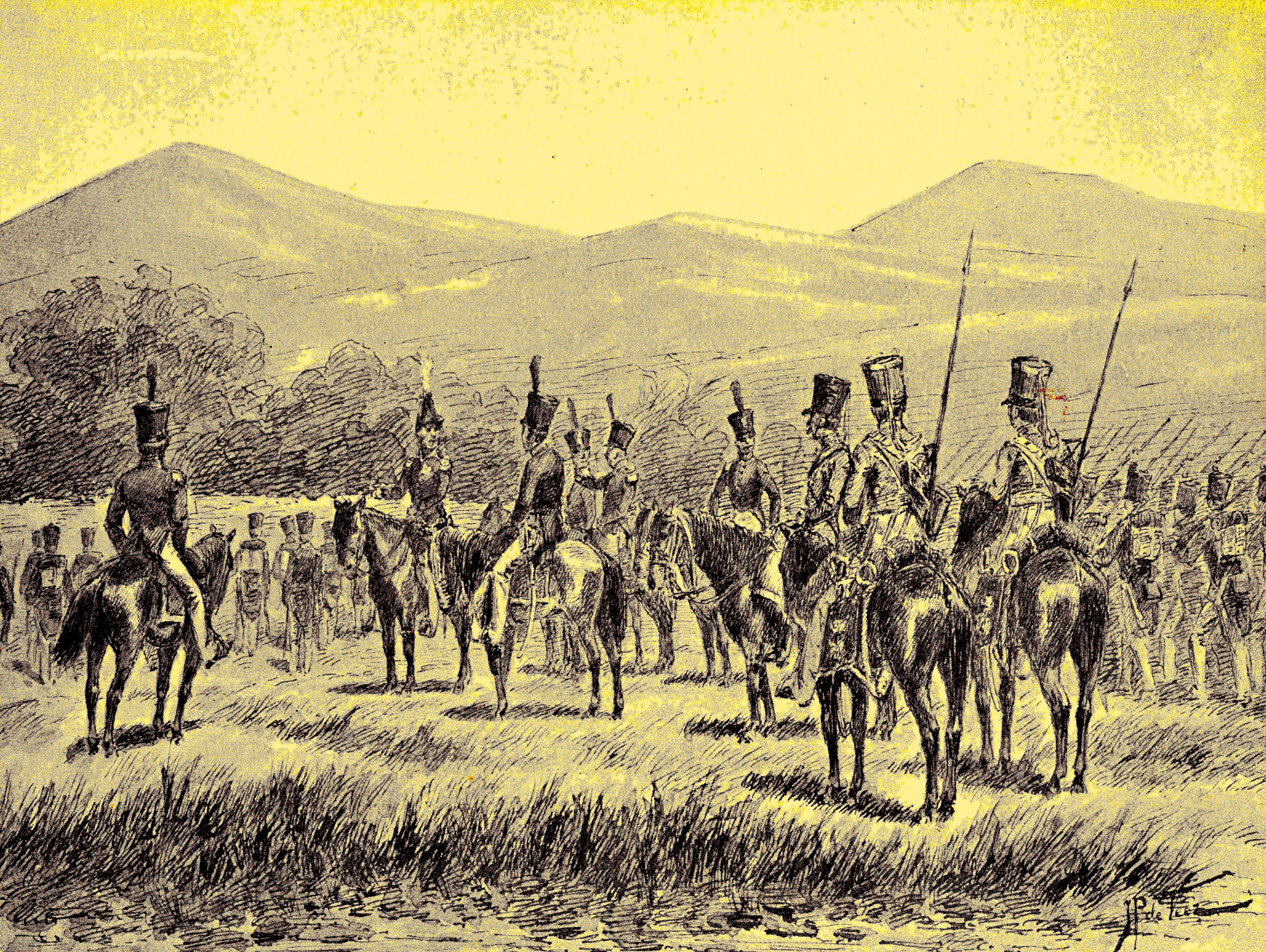
- Royal Netherlands East Indies Army troops at Bone
Date	1824–1825
Location	South Sulawesi
Result	Bone victory

Belligerents
Dutch East Indies	Sultanate of Bone

Commanders and leaders
Godert van der Capellen	We Maniratu Arung Data

Strength
Unknown but larger	Unknown

Casualties and losses
14 killed 60 wounded	Light casualties

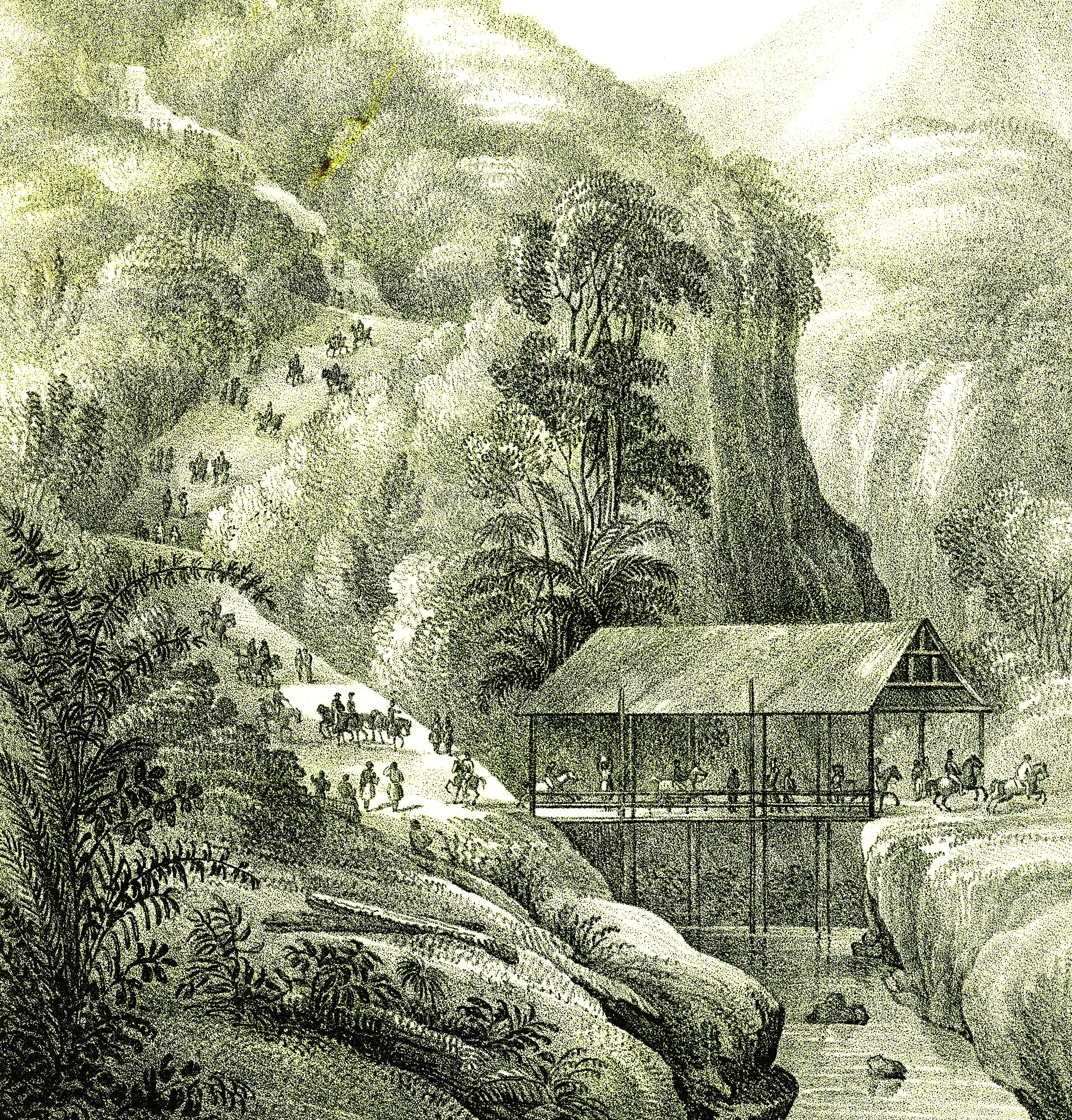
Dutch troops in Makassar (the Celebes).

The First Bone War was a series of punitive expeditions of the Royal Netherlands East Indies Army against the Bone state in South Sulawesi in 1824–25.

Bone had been an ally of the Dutch East India Company since the Treaty of Bungaya of 1667, but considered itself released from its obligations by the Dutch surrender to the British in 1811. In 1814 and again in 1816, Bone fought against the British. In 1816, the Dutch were restored to their former colonies per the outcome of the Congress of Vienna. When the Governor-General Godert van der Capellen visited South Sulawesi in 1824 to renew the Treaty of Bungaya, Bone was the only native state to refuse. When van der Capellen left, the queen of Bone attacked the Dutch positions, annihilating two garrisons.

In 1825, the Dutch and their allies from Gowa counter-attacked. The outbreak of the Java War later that year necessitated the withdrawal of most Dutch soldiers. Thus, the war ended without Bone having renewed the Treaty of Bungaya. The stalemate persisted until 1838, when Bone finally renewed the treaty.

== Aftermath ==
As a result of the Dutch attacks, the port of Bajoe was abandoned by the Sama people, who fled to Luwu.
