= South Sulawesi expeditions of 1905 =

The South Sulawesi expeditions of 1905 (Dutch: Zuid-Celebes Expeditie), which included the Third Bone War and the Gowa War (Makassar: Bunduka ri Gowa), were undertaken by the Royal Netherlands East Indies Army (KNIL) to force the states of south Sulawesi (Celebes) to sign the Korte Verklaring (Short Statement or Declaration), the standard agreement whereby a native Indonesian ruler agreed to accept Dutch sovereignty. According to certain Dutch historians, the expeditions were an "obligation", because the Dutch had responsibility for law and order. One Indonesian historian has argued that it was actually strategic: that south Sulawesi was the "key" to controlling the so-called Great East. There was also an economic motive: to extend the tax-collecting powers of the government of Sulawesi. The expeditions received the imprimatur of the Governor of Sulawesi, Alexander Kroesen, in a letter dated 11 February 1904.

The chief targets of the expeditions were the most powerful south Sulawesi kingdoms of Bone, Luwu and Wajo. The expeditions were preceded by negotiations, which roundly failed, and on 14 July 1905, in a letter to Governor Kroesen, Governor-General J. B. van Heutsz stated his intention to occupy all of south Sulawesi and compel the local rulers to sign the Short Declaration. This was the so-called "Peace Policy" (Pacificatie politiek).

== Campaign against Bone ==
On 18 July 1905, twenty-five Dutch warships and one transport anchored about 5,000 metres off Bajoe. The next day a convoy sailed into the Bay of Bone to deliver a letter containing the Dutch demands to La Pawawoi Karaeng Segeri, the thirty-first king of Bone, who ruled from 1895 to 1905. The Dutch demanded that he turn over policing duties in his ports of Bajoe and Pallima to them, and that he accept compensation for giving up his right to tax imports and exports passing through the harbours. The king was given twenty-four hours to respond. On the governor's command, a courier met with the king at Ujung Padang on 21 July. The king refused the demands.

La Pawawoi appointed his son, Baso Abdul Hamid, commander-in-chief of his forces and ordered that a state of war be announced throughout the kingdom. He then took oaths of loyalty from his regional commanders and proceeded to prepare defense at those places the Dutch were likely to land. The Dutch came ashore at Ujung Pattiro, at an estuary of the Cenrana River, on 20 July. They were resisted and many leading men of Bone fell in battle. The Bone forces retreated to Bajoe, which the Dutch attacked on 27 July. Bajoe was the centre of Bone resistance, but it fell to a superior force and the king fled first to Passempe, then to Citta and finally to Gunung Awo in the land of the Toraja. Baso Abdul Hamid was killed in action in this region on 18 November. The state of Bone was completely occupied by 30 July.

After the death of his son, La Pawawoi offered terms to the Dutch. He was apprehended and exiled to Bandung on 14 December. There he died in 1911, gaining the posthumous royal name Matinroe ri Bandung ("who died in Bandung").

== Campaign against Gowa ==
On 15 October 1905, the governor of Sulawesi sent a letter to the king of the Sultanate of Gowa, I Makkulau Karaeng Lembagaparang - the thirty-third king of Gowa, bearing the regnal name Sultan Husain, who ruled 1885–1906 - inviting him to negotiate at Ujung Pandang. The letter was accompanied by the ultimatum that if he did not respond by 18 October, Gowa would be besieged. The Gowan fortresses of Balangnipa, Camba, Pangkajene and Galesong were fortified to resist the Dutch.

I Makkulau ignored the ultimatum. When Dutch forces under Governor Kroesen approached his palace at Jongaya, he was asked again to submit, but he instead retired into the mountains with his regalia and court, hoping to draw the Dutch into battle on unfavourable terrain. On 20 October the Dutch attacked. There was serious fighting in Gunungsari and Lakiung. The royal family fled to Limbung. The king's son, I Pangsuriseng Arung Allita, and brother, I Mangimangi Karaeng Bontonompo, then went to the kingdom of Barus, while another son, I Mappanyukki Datu Suppa, fled to the Toraja.

On 18 December, believing the king of Gowa was in Barus, the Dutch sent a delegation to re-open negotiations with him, but the king had moved to the region of Alitta of the kingdom of Sawitto. On 21 December, the Dutch besieged the fortress of Alitta, killing all the Gowan soldiers inside, including I Pangsuriseng, and capturing the wounded I Mangimangi. The king himself had escaped to Sidenreng. Surrounded at Warue, he managed to escape, but during his flight fell into a ravine and died. When his remains were discovered by the Dutch, they were brought to Jongaya for burial.

After I Makkulau's death, I Mappanyukki remained at large with his forces among the Toraja. After fifteen months of resistance, he was convinced by his father-in-law, La Parenrengi Karaeng Tinggimae, to seek peace with the Dutch. Negotiations were begun through the resident official at Pare-Pare, but before an agreement was reached he was captured and with his followers exiled to Selayang Island. He was allowed to return in 1908, when his uncle, I Mangimangi, was exiled to Bima.

== Aftermath ==
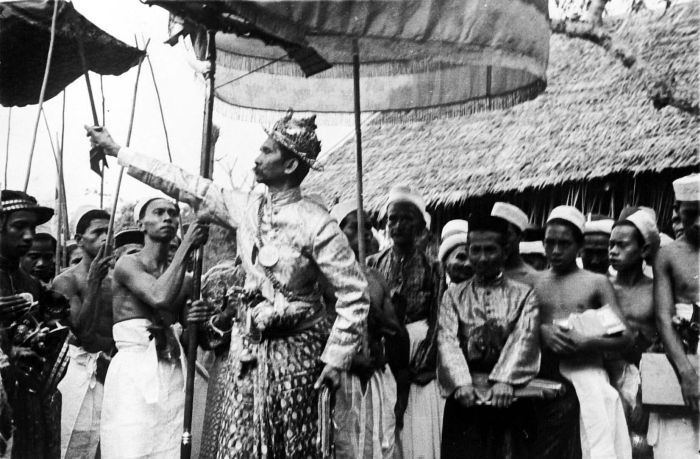
I Mangimangi at a later date, as king of Gowa

Gowa and Bone were annexed to the Government of Sulawesi and Subordinate Areas (Gouvernement Celebes en Onderhoorigheden). In 1911 this was divided into seven sections (afdelingen): Makassar, Bantaeng, Bone, Pare-Pare, Luwu, Mandar and Buton. The east Sulawesi coast was a separate area. Each section was governed through an assistant resident (assistent-resident).

With the capture or exile of all the Gowan royal family, the Dutch seized the regalia, including the sword named Sundanga and the chain named Tanisamang. The banner of the Bate Salapanga council was likewise confiscated. Much of the war booty was donated to the Bataviaasch Genootschap, now the Museum Nasional Indonesia, but plenty of weaponry and jewellery found its way to the Netherlands, to be deposited in the National Museum of Ethnology. By a decree of the governor of 17 July 1906, all war booty was the property of the Bataviaasch Genootschap. Some of the booty taken in the campaigns of 1905 was eventually returned to Bone and Gowa, where it is maintained by the royal houses to this day.

== Sources ==
- Budiarti, Hari (2007). "Taking and Returning Objects in a Colonial Context: Tracing the Collections Acquired during the Bone-Gowa Military Expeditions". In Pieter J. ter Keurs (ed.). Colonial Collections Revisited. Leiden: CNWS Publications.
- Gibson, Thomas (2005). And the Sun Pursued the Moon: Symbolic Knowledge and Traditional Authority Among the Makassar. University of Hawaii Press.
- Tol, Roger (2000). "Textual Authority: The Toloq Rumpaqna Boné by I Mallaq Daéng Mabéla, Arung Manajéng". Bijdragen tot de Taal-, Land- en Volkenkunde. 156 (3): 499–520. doi:10.1163/22134379-90003837. JSTOR 27865650.
