= Azikin Solthan =

Indonesian politician (born 1953)

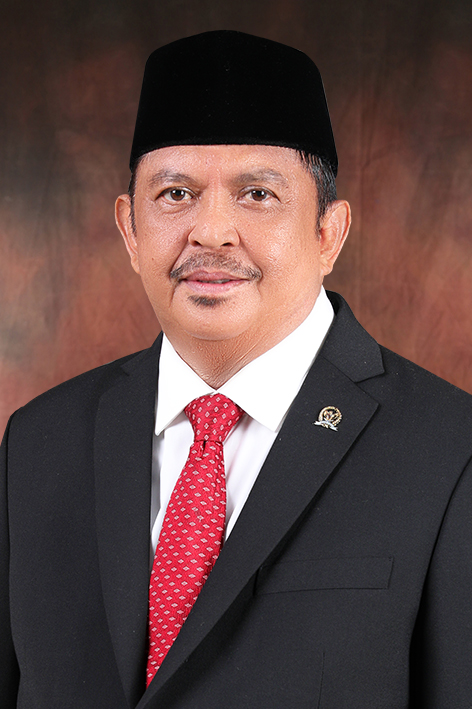
- 2019 portrait

Member of the House of Representatives
- Incumbent
- Assumed office 1 October 2014
- Constituency: South Sulawesi I

Regent of Bantaeng
- In office 1998–2008
- Preceded by: Muhammad Said Saggaf
- Succeeded by: Nurdin Abdullah

Personal details
- Born: 7 August 1953 (age 72) Bantaeng, South Sulawesi, Indonesia
- Party: Gerindra (since 2014); Golkar (before 2014)

Azikin Solthan (born 7 August 1953) is an Indonesian politician of the Golkar party and former civil servant. He has served as a member of the House of Representatives since 2014. Prior to becoming a legislator, he was the regent of Bantaeng in South Sulawesi between 1998 and 2008, and before that he worked in the municipal governments of Bantaeng and Gowa for 20 years.

== Early life and education ==
Azikin Solthan was born on 7 August 1953 in the village of Bonto Lojong, in Bantaeng Regency. He was one of five children between Solthan and Nur Hayati. His father Solthan served as the regent of Bantaeng between 1966 and 1978. After completing high school in 1972, Azikin would go to the provincial capital of Makassar (then named Ujungpandang) where he studied at the Home Affairs Governance Academy, graduating in 1977. He later obtained a bachelor's from a government-run public administration polytechnic in Jakarta (1983), a master's in public administration from Hasanuddin University in 2000, and a doctorate from the State University of Makassar in 2010.

== Career ==
=== Civil servant and regent ===
Solthan began his career as a civil servant in 1977 as the chief of the Hansip unit of Bissappu district of Bantaeng, and then served for a time as a village head of Mallilingi in Bantaeng. He then moved to neighboring Gowa Regency in 1985, and by 1988 he was district head of Gowa's Bajeng district. By 1992, he was head of Gowa's municipal revenue department. On 19 July 1997, he was appointed as head of the public relations department of the South Sulawesi provincial government, with his predecessor having been elected to the provincial legislature. His last position in the civil service was regional secretary of Gowa.

In 1998, Solthan would be elected regent of Bantaeng by its DPRD, and he was reelected for a second term in 2003. During his term as regent, Solthan heavily promoted agriculture in Bantaeng, and often held roadshows to attract investors. In 2001, he promoted the planting of GMO cotton plants in Bantaeng, citing its potential to increase farmer and local government income. He further noted that the municipal government did not have the ability to prevent the crop's planting as it was largely local farmers who wanted to use the GMO plants.

=== DPR ===
For a time after his tenure in Bantaeng expired, Solthan remained active as a civil servant in South Sulawesi's provincial government. In the 2014 legislative election, he was elected into the House of Representatives (DPR) as a Gerindra Party member representing South Sulawesi's 1st district after securing 57,352 votes. He would be reelected from the same district in 2019 with 74,997 votes. and in 2024 with 54,667 votes

Within DPR, he served in the Second Commission during his first term, Fourth Commission in his second term, and Seventh Commission in his third term.

== Family ==
Solthan was married to Linda Azikin Solthan, and the couple has five children. Two of his sons, Ibrahim and Syahlan, contested the 2008 Bantaeng regency election to succeed him, but they were both defeated by Nurdin Abdullah. Abdullah would in turn be succeeded by Ilham Azikin, another of Solthan's sons, in 2018. Linda Azikin Solthan died on 3 November 2025.
