= Haji Isam =

Indonesian coal entrepreneur (born 1977)

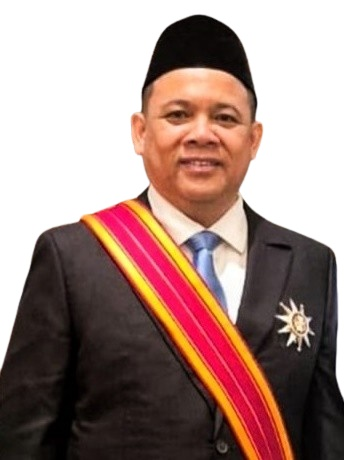
- Haji Isam upon receiving the Honorary Star of Mahaputera Utama (2025)
- Born: 1 January 1977 (age 49); Batulicin, South Kalimantan, Indonesia
- Other name: Haji Isam
- Known for: Owner of Jhonlin Group
- Children: 2
- Relatives: Bustamam (parent-in-law)

Andi Syamsuddin Arsyad (born 1 January 1977), is a businessman from South Kalimantan with business interests in plantations, mining, and transportation. He is widely known as the owner of Jhonlin Group, which operates coal, biodiesel, and integrated logistics services businesses in Kalimantan.

Haji Isam previously served as Deputy Treasurer of the National Campaign Team (TKN) of Joko Widodo–Ma’ruf Amin during the 2019 Indonesian presidential election. He was previously active in the National Mandate Party (PAN).

== Early life ==
Andi Syamsuddin Arsyad was born in Batulicin, South Kalimantan, to Andi Arsyad and Wardatul Wardiyah. His father is a tobacco trader from Bone, South Sulawesi, who migrated to South Kalimantan, while his mother is a Banjar. He was the sixth of 14 siblings, five from his father’s first wife and eight from his mother.

After completing high school in 1996, Haji Isam did not pursue higher education because of financial constraints and instead worked as a log truck driver for three years. Through his connections with local businessmen, he learned about the coal mining business. In 2003, he founded Jhonlin Baratama, which later grew into the Jhonlin Group.

== Business ==
Haji Isam's company subsequently grew rapidly, producing up to 400,000 tons of coal per month. He expanded his business into the logistics sector through Jhonlin Logistik, shipping through Jhonlin Marine and Shipping, and aviation through Jhonlin Air Transport. He is also known for major projects in the agricultural sector through Jhonlin Agro Raya, which is engaged in biodiesel production and oil palm plantations.

In 2017, he also built a sugar factory and established a 20,000-hectare sugarcane plantation in Bombana, Southeast Sulawesi, through Jhonlin Batu Mandiri, as part of a national sugar self-sufficiency project.

Haji Isam has a business relationship with entrepreneur Timothy Savitri, a business associate through joint ownership in the property sector alongside his son, Jhony Saputra.

== Wealth ==
According to a report by CNBC Indonesia, Haji Isam’s wealth is estimated at around Rp101 trillion, although his name has not yet appeared on Forbes’ list of the world’s richest people. He is reportedly using Seacons Trading Ltd, a company registered in the British Virgin Islands, to purchase a Boeing Business Jet MAX 7 in 2018.

== Controversies ==
=== Alleged criminalization of business rivals ===
Haji Isam has been alleged to have been involved in the criminalization of several of his competitors in the coal business in South Kalimantan. Among them were Haji Bachrullah (KUD Gajah Mada) and Haji Amir Nasarudin (Baramega Citra Mulia Persada), who were arrested for mining in protected forest areas without permits. After they were imprisoned, Jhonlin Baratama subsequently managed the lands, with Haji Isam serving as its contractor. Haji Isam denied any involvement in the legal proceedings against his competitors and stated that he was merely carrying out official business arrangements with the owners of the mining concessions.

=== Relations with law enforcement officials ===
Haji Isam has often been associated with close ties to several senior police officials, including Bambang Hendarso Danuri. A flight manifest indicates that Haji Isam and several police officials traveled together for Umrah in February 2010. Although he acknowledged knowing several officials, Haji Isam denied having used these relationships for business purposes.

=== Dispute with PT SILO in Pulau Laut ===
In 2018, Haji Isam was accused of being behind the revocation of the mining permit belonging to Sebuku Iron Lateritic Ores (SILO) by South Kalimantan Governor Sahbirin Noor, who was also his relative. The dispute arose from an overlap between the oil palm plantation owned by Multi Sarana Agro Mandiri, a subsidiary of Jhonlin Group, and SILO’s mining concession area. Haji Isam denied any involvement and stated that his company was working in cooperation with the state-owned enterprise Inhutani and was not involved in the dispute.

=== Bombana Sugar Project Controversies ===
Jhonlin Group’s investment in a sugarcane plantation and sugar factory project in Bombana also drew criticism over allegations that it had seized grazing land belonging to local communities and livestock farmers. The project’s permits were expedited with the direct support of the then Minister of Agriculture, Amran Sulaiman, who was reportedly a cousin of Haji Isam. Criticism arose because the area used was allegedly inconsistent with Bombana’s Regional Spatial Plan (RTRW) and involved using forest areas under a scheme whose legality was questioned.

=== Alleged gratification of public officials ===
Haji Isam’s name was also mentioned during the trial of a corruption case involving Zainudin Hasan, the younger brother of Zulkifli Hasan, who at the time was serving as Speaker of the House of Representatives. In the prosecutor’s indictment, it was alleged that PT Jhonlin and PT Baramega Citra Mulia Persada provided gratuities to Zainudin in exchange for a permit to use forest areas granted by the then Minister of Forestry, Zulkifli Hasan. The Corruption Eradication Commission (KPK) was urged to investigate the alleged corporate bribery in the case.

=== Controversies surrounding offshore entities and export pricing practices ===
In the export of coal and lignite, several intermediary companies registered in low-transparency jurisdictions served as the primary buyers of coal produced by entities associated with Haji Isam. Trade data show that PT Jhonlin Group, together with PT Baramega Citra Mulia Persada and the Gajah Mada Village Unit Cooperative (KUD), sold almost all of their coal to three offshore companies, which were:

- Colestar Resources Ltd (British Virgin Islands), registered in the name of Dody Hanggodo.
- Castro Enterprises Ltd (Marshall Islands)
- Alphington Universal Ltd (Marshall Islands)

These three entities are recorded as the primary buyers in export flows to countries such as China, India, and the Philippines, but are registered in jurisdictions with limited transparency, meaning that this structure could potentially be used to shift profits abroad through pricing that does not reflect fair arm’s-length transactions.

Such practices, in which producers in Indonesia sell commodities to offshore intermediaries at relatively low prices, after which the intermediaries resell them at high margins, can result in profits being recorded overseas (transfer pricing), potentially reducing tax liabilities and state revenues through under-invoicing (setting export prices below market prices).

== Personal life ==
Haji Issam is married to Nursam, and they have three children. His first child, Liana Saputri, married Putra Rizky Bustaman, also known as Haji Putra 969, a businessman and luxury car collector.

Hajji Issam's other son is Jhony Saputra, who became involved in managing Jhonlin companies at a young age, serves as a commissioner on several family-owned entities.

== Awards ==
- Indonesia:
  - 3rd class of Star of Mahaputera (2025)
