= Jhonlin Air Transport =

Airline of Indonesia

IATA	ICAO	Call sign
—	JLB	JHONLIN
- Founded: 2008; 18 years ago
- Commenced operations: 2011; 15 years ago
- Operating bases: Syamsudin Noor Airport
- Hubs: Syamsudin Noor Airport, Banjarbaru
- Focus cities: Syamsudin Noor Airport, Banjarbaru; Batu Licin Airport, Batulicin; Stagen Airport, Kotabaru
- Fleet size: 3
- Destinations: 4
- Parent company: PT. Jhonlin Air Transport (JAT)
- Headquarters: Banjarmasin, Indonesia
- Key people: H. Syamsuddin, Teuku Djohan Basyar; CEO: Teuku Djohan
- Website: Website JAT-Airlines

Jhonlin Air Transport is a regional airline in Indonesia that focus on serving the areas in South Kalimantan, Indonesia. The maiden flight of the airline began on November 3, 2011. The inaugural flight route is from Batulicin to Banjarbaru.

== Fleet ==
As of February 22, 2022, Jhonlin Air Transport only have 3 fixed wing aircraft :

- 1 Boeing 737-700 BBJ series
- 2 Beechcraft Super King Air 350

The former fleet of Jhonlin Air Transport is:

- 3 Bell 407
- 1 Bell 429 GlobalRanger
- 3 Cessna Grand Caravan
- 2 Hawker 900XP
- 1 ATR 72

== Accidents ==
The Hawker 900XP PK-JBH, one of two belonging to the company, was involved in an accident in February 2013 while landing at Halim airport in Jakarta. The aircraft lost the left landing gear on impact.

A Cessna Grand Caravan 208-EX PK-JBR crashed in Papua in October 2018 carrying a passenger named Daus in Beoga, Puncak Regency in Papua.
