= Soni Sumarsono =

Indonesian politician

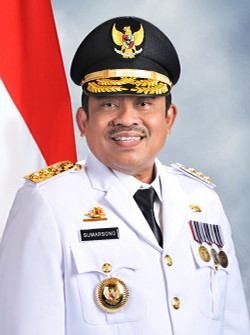
- Official portrait, 2018

Director-General of Regional Autonomy
- In office 1 July 2015 – 4 March 2019
- Minister: Tjahjo Kumolo

Acting Governor of South Sulawesi
- In office 9 April 2018 – 5 September 2018
- Preceded by: Syahrul Yasin Limpo
- Succeeded by: Nurdin Abdullah

Acting Governor of Jakarta
- In office 7 March 2017 – 15 April 2017
- Preceded by: Basuki Tjahaja Purnama
- Succeeded by: Basuki Tjahaja Purnama
- In office 26 October 2016 – 12 February 2017
- Preceded by: Basuki Tjahaja Purnama
- Succeeded by: Basuki Tjahaja Purnama

Acting Governor of North Sulawesi
- In office 20 September 2015 – 11 February 2016
- Preceded by: Sinyo Harry Sarundajang
- Succeeded by: Olly Dondokambey

Personal details
- Born: 22 February 1959 (age 66) Tulungagung, East Java, Indonesia
- Political party: Independent

Soni Sumarsono (born 22 February 1959) is an Indonesian civil servant who was the Director-General of Regional Autonomy in the Ministry of Home Affairs. As part of his position, he has become acting governors for the provinces of South Sulawesi, Jakarta and North Sulawesi.

== Early life and family ==
Soni Sumarsono was born in Tulungagung, East Java on 22 February 1959. He studied for a bachelor's degree in state administration at Gadjah Mada University. Later on, he studied at the Asian Institute of Management in Manila for his master's degree in development management and a doctorate for educational management at Jakarta State University.

Sumarsono is married to Trie Rachayu, and the pair has three daughters.

== Career ==
He found employment as a civil servant after graduating from Gadjah Mada, and rose up in the ranks to become a second echelon staff at the age of 42. By 2010, he was assigned as the assistant deputy for national borders, and in 2015, he was selected as the director-general for regional autonomy. As director-general, Sumarsono was appointed as acting governor of North Sulawesi on 22 September 2015.

As he was approaching his retirement, he was discharged from his post as director general in March 2019.

=== Jakarta ===
Due to both the sitting governor Basuki Tjahaja Purnama (Ahok) and his deputy Djarot Saiful Hidayat taking a campaign leave for the 2017 Jakarta gubernatorial election, Sumarsono was sworn in as acting governor on 26 October 2016. During his time as governor, Sumarsono restored several former high-ranking city officials who were demoted under Ahok, to the latter's criticism. Sumarsono also stopped benefits to the RT/RW of the city and soldiers and police officers stationed there, though Sumarsono reintroduced funding for Betawi groups. In January 2017, Sumarsono instructed a change in the design of the MRT Jakarta trains because he believed the original design resembled a cricket insect. The redesign incurred a cost of 64 billion rupiah. Ahok returned to office on 11 February 2017.

Due to a runoff phase in the gubernatorial election, Sumarsono once again became acting governor on 6 March 2017. Ahok once more returned to office on 15 April 2017.

=== South Sulawesi ===
Sumarsono was assigned to another acting governor post due to the expiry of South Sulawesi governor Syahrul Yasin Limpo's term, serving until the elected governor from the 2018 South Sulawesi gubernatorial election could be sworn in. He criticized Makassar mayor Mohammad Ramdhan Pomanto's celebration of a blank box win at the 2018 Makassar mayoral election, noting that a public official should refrain from such actions. He was replaced by elected governor Nurdin Abdullah on 7 September 2018.
