= Ilham Azikin =

Indonesian politician (born 1973)

Ilham Syah Azikin
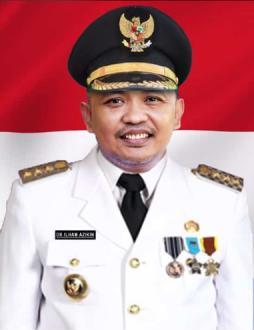

Regent of Bantaeng
- In office 26 September 2018 – 26 September 2023
- Preceded by: Nurdin Abdullah
- Succeeded by: Andi Abubakar (act.); Fathul Fauzy Nurdin

Personal details
- Born: 25 November 1973 (age 52) Ujungpandang, South Sulawesi, Indonesia
- Party: Nasdem Party

Ilham Syah Azikin (born 25 November 1973) is an Indonesian civil servant and politician who served as the regent of Bantaeng Regency, South Sulawesi between 2018 and 2023. Prior to being elected regent, he worked for around twenty years in the municipal government of Maros Regency. He was the third generation of his family to serve as Bantaeng's regent.

== Early life and education ==
Ilham Syah Azikin was born on 25 November 1973 in Makassar (then named Ujungpandang) to Azikin Solthan and Linda Azikin. His father Azikin Solthan was regent of Bantaeng Regency from 1998 to 2008, and so was his grandfather Solthan who served from 1966 to 1978. He completed his basic education in the city, graduating high school in 1992.

Azikin continued his studies at the Institute of Home Affairs Governance (IPDN) in Sumedang, graduating in 1997 with a diploma. He obtained further degrees from IPDN (bachelor's in politics, 2001), Hasanuddin University (master's in public administration, 2004), and State University of Makassar (doctorate in public administration, 2015).

== Career ==
After he graduated from IPDN, Azikin began to work as a civil servant in the municipal government of Maros Regency in South Sulawesi. By 2002, he had become district head of Turikale in Maros, and he then became head of the municipal government's human resources department by 2004. In ensuing years, he headed Maros' tourism, sports, mining, and investment departments. He retired from his civil servant position in January 2018 to run in Bantaeng's regency election, and at that time he held the post of second assistant to Maros' regent.

Bantaeng's 2018 regency election saw Azikin run with Bantaeng DPRD speaker Sahabuddin as his running mate, with the backing of six political parties holding 15 out of 25 seats in the DPRD. Azikin and Sahabuddin won the election after securing 48,549 votes (45.9%) in a three-way race. He was sworn in by his predecessor in Bantaeng and new governor of South Sulawesi, Nurdin Abdullah, on 26 September 2018.

As regent, Azikin implemented an agricultural insurance program backed by the miunicipal government, which covered harvest failures and livestock diseases. In response to the COVID-19 pandemic, the municipal government of Bantaeng distributed financial aid to rural small businesses. Under Azikin, the municipal government also distributed school uniforms at no charge for elementary and middle school students. Azikin's first term expired on 26 September 2023. Politically, he is a member of the Nasdem Party.

He ran for his second term in the 2024 Bantaeng regency election, but was defeated by Fathul Fauzy Nurdin, Nurdin Abdullah's son. Azikin won 50,527 votes (42.26%) to Fathul's 69,036 (57.74%).

== Personal life ==
He is a practitioner of pencak silat, having learned from a Ternate-born pencak silat teacher who his father had invited to Bantaeng in 1977. Azikin is married to Sri Dewi Yanti, and the couple has four children. Sri was elected to the South Sulawesi Regional House of Representatives during the 2024 election as a Nasdem Party member.
