= WAOO =

WAOO may refer to:

- WAOO-LP, a low-power radio station (94.5 FM) licensed to Suwanee, Georgia, United States
- Syamsudin Noor Airport (ICAO code WAOO)
