= 2018 South Sulawesi gubernatorial election =

← 2013	27 June 2018	2024 →
- Turnout: 70.5%
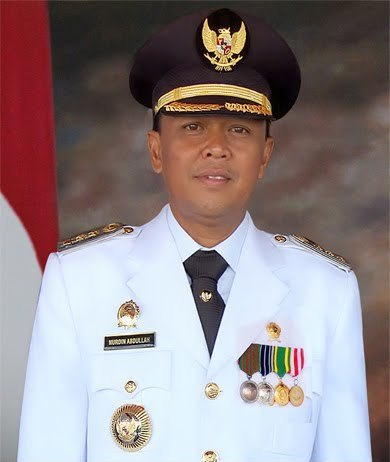

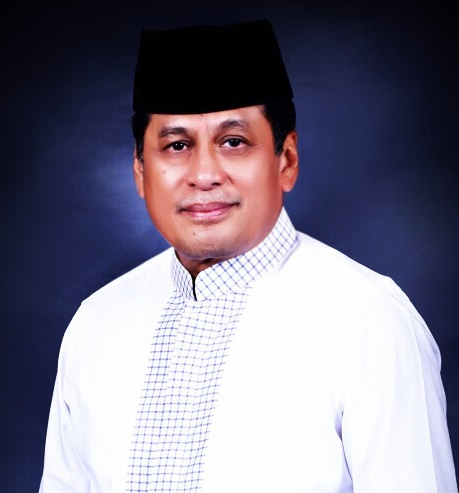

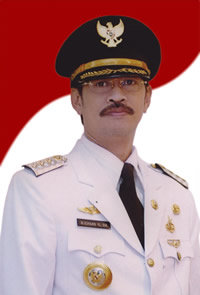

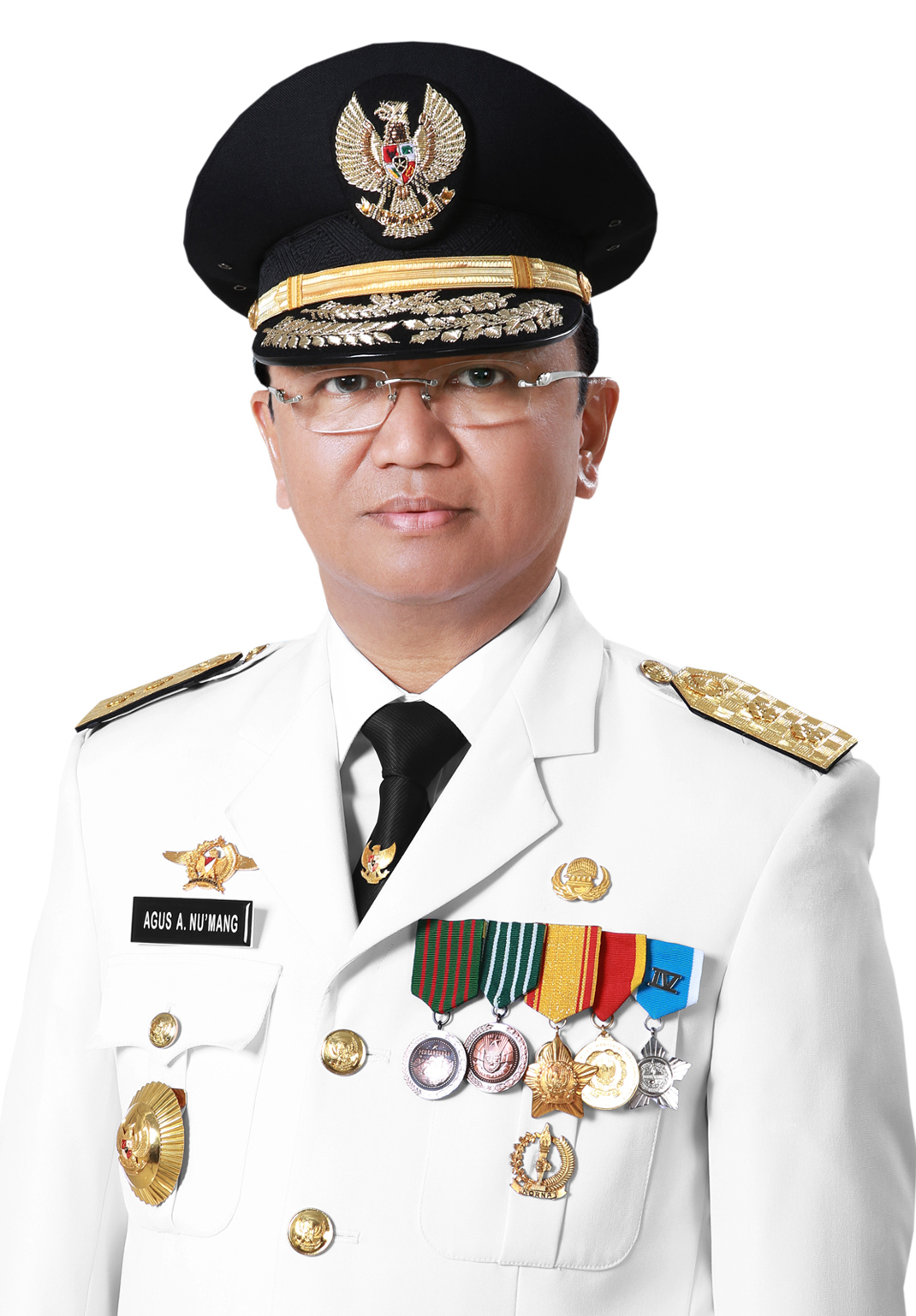
Nominee	Nurdin Abdullah	Nurdin Halid
Party	PDI-P	Golkar
Running mate	Andi Sudirman Sulaiman	Aziz Kahar Muzakkar
Popular vote	1,867,303	1,162,751
Percentage	43.87%	27.32%
Nominee	Ichsan Yasin Limpo	Agus Arifin Nu'mang
Party	Independent	Gerindra
Running mate	Andi Mudzakar	Tanribali Lamo
Popular vote	807,330	419,055
Percentage	18.97%	9.85%
- Results by city/regency
Governor and Deputy Governor before election
Syahrul Yasin Limpo
Agus Arifin Nu'mang
Golkar
Elected Governor and Deputy Governor
Nurdin Abdullah
Sudirman Sulaiman
PDI-P

The 2018 South Sulawesi Gubernatorial Election took place on 27 June 2018 as part of the simultaneous local elections. It was held to elect the governor of South Sulawesi along with their deputy, whilst members of the provincial council (Dewan Perwakilan Rakyat Daerah) will be re-elected in 2019.

Incumbent Syahrul Yasin Limpo was barred from participating in the elections due to a constitutional term limits. Official candidates were sitting Deputy Governor of South Sulawesi Agus Arifin Nu'mang (id), former chairman of PSSI and current Program Coordinator of Golkar Nurdin Halid, Syahrul Yasin Limpo's brother and former Regent of Gowa Regency Ichsan Yasin Limpo (id) and incumbent Regent of Bantaeng Regency Nurdin Abdullah.

== Timeline ==
The election will have a voter count of 6,323,711, spread across 24 cities and regencies in South Sulawesi across over 17,000 polling stations.

Registration for party-backed candidates were opened between 8 and 10 January 2018, while independent candidates were required to register between 22 and 26 November 2017. The campaigning period would commence between 15 February and 24 June, with a three-day election silence before voting on 27 June.

== Candidates ==
The Ichsan Yasin Limpo and Andi Mudzakar pair was the only independent pair in the election, having submitted over 500,000 verified identity cards in comparison to the required 483,514 (7.5 percent of the voter population) although several political parties still declared their support for the ticket.

Candidates backed by political parties are required to have the backing of at least 17 seats in the DPRD (regional council) to run.

#	Candidate	Position	Running mate	Parties
1	Nurdin Halid (Golkar)	Program Coordinator of Golkar	Aziz Kahar Muzakkar (Non–Partisan)	Golkar; Nasdem; Hanura; PKB; PKPI; Total: 35 seats
2	Agus Arifin Nu'mang (Great Indonesia Movement Party)	Deputy Governor of South Sulawesi	Tanribali Lamo (Non-Partisan)	Gerindra; PBB; PPP; Total: 19 seats
3	Nurdin Abdullah	Regent of Bantaeng Regency (Non-Partisan)	Andi Sudirman Sulaiman (Non-Partisan)	PDI-P; PKS; PAN; PSI; Total: 20 seats
4	Ichsan Yasin Limpo (Non-Partisan)	Regent of Gowa Regency	Andi Mudzakar (Non-Partisan)	Independent; Supported by: Demokrat; Perindo; Berkarya

== Polling ==
=== After formal nominations ===
Pollster	Date	Sample size	Results
Sinergi	14–20 February 2018	1,000	IYL (27.5%), NH (24.8%), NA (21.2%), AAN (8.9%)
Populi Center	15–22 January 2018	800	NA (32.0%), IYL (23.0%), NH (17.0%), AAN (10.9%)

=== Before nominations ===
Pollster	Date	Sample size	Results
Poltracking	10–17 August 2017	800	Nurdin Halid (8.87%), Nurdin Abdullah (8.57%), Ichsan Yasin Limpo (6.01%), Agus Arifin Nu'mang (3.96%)

== Results ==
=== Quick count ===
Unofficial

Pollster	Nurdin-Aziz	Ichsan-Andi	Agus-Tanribali	Nurdin-Andi
CRC	26.67	20.7	9.45	43.18
Indikator	26.65	18.02	10.91	44.41
Populi Center	27.68	18.98	9.90	43.44
SMRC	28.85	18.18	9.82	43.15

Official

The following data provides the result of the formal quick count conducted by the National Election Commission (KPU) for the 2018 South Sulawesi Gubernatorial Election. The quick count provided by the National Election Commission (KPU) serves as a basis of information for the people to know the result of the Simultaneous Local Elections held on 27 June 2018 as fast and as transparent as possible. The data which serves as the basis of this formal quick count comes from the C1 Model entries. The formal quick count is a temporary result and is not final. Should there be any errors found in the conducting process of the formal quick count, fixes shall be made in the national recapitulation process. The data provided originates from 16,256 ballot centres from a total of 17,145 ballot centres (94.81%).

Candidate	Votes Won	% Votes
Nurdin Halid dan Aziz Qahhar Mudzakkar	1.100.907	27.26%
Agus Arifin Nu'mang dan Tanribali Lamo	394.552	9.77%
Nurdin Abdullah dan Andi Sudirman Sulaiman	1.763.460	43.67%
Ichsan Yasin Limpo dan Andi Mudzakkar	779.491	19.30%
Total Votes	4.031.088	99,00%
Spoilt Votes	75.388	1,00%
Voter Turnout	4.118.209	71,46%
Registered Voters	5.763.300	100,00%
