= Bonto Bulaeng =

- Location in South Sulawesi and Indonesia Bonto Bulaeng (Indonesia)
- Coordinates: 5°28′5.3544″S 119°56′58.9308″E
- Country: Indonesia
- Province: South Sulawesi
- Regency: Bantaeng Regency
- District: Sinoa District
- Elevation: 2,569 ft (783 m)

Population (2010)
  - Total: 2,260
- Time zone: UTC+8 (Indonesia Central Standard Time)

Bonto Bulaeng is a village in Sinoa district, Bantaeng Regency in South Sulawesi province, Indonesia. Its population is 2260.

== Climate ==
Bonto Bulaeng has a tropical monsoon climate (Am) with little rainfall from August to October and heavy to very heavy rainfall in the remaining months.

Climate data for Bonto Bulaeng
Month	Jan	Feb	Mar	Apr	May	Jun	Jul	Aug	Sep	Oct	Nov	Dec	Year
Mean daily maximum °C (°F)	25.9 (78.6)	26.0 (78.8)	26.4 (79.5)	26.8 (80.2)	26.8 (80.2)	26.3 (79.3)	26.3 (79.3)	27.0 (80.6)	27.6 (81.7)	28.1 (82.6)	27.3 (81.1)	26.2 (79.2)	26.7 (80.1)
Daily mean °C (°F)	22.2 (72.0)	22.3 (72.1)	22.4 (72.3)	22.6 (72.7)	22.6 (72.7)	22.0 (71.6)	21.5 (70.7)	21.7 (71.1)	22.2 (72.0)	22.8 (73.0)	22.9 (73.2)	22.3 (72.1)	22.3 (72.1)
Mean daily minimum °C (°F)	18.5 (65.3)	18.6 (65.5)	18.5 (65.3)	18.4 (65.1)	18.4 (65.1)	17.7 (63.9)	16.7 (62.1)	16.4 (61.5)	16.8 (62.2)	17.6 (63.7)	18.5 (65.3)	18.5 (65.3)	17.9 (64.2)
Average precipitation mm (inches)	478 (18.8)	338 (13.3)	295 (11.6)	254 (10.0)	232 (9.1)	137 (5.4)	104 (4.1)	42 (1.7)	42 (1.7)	62 (2.4)	254 (10.0)	343 (13.5)	2,581 (101.6)
Source: Climate-Data.org
