= Bonto Marannu, Bantaeng =

Bonto Marannu
- Location in South Sulawesi and Indonesia Bonto Marannu (Indonesia)
- Coordinates: 5°26′19.7088″S 119°55′57.0396″E
- Country: Indonesia
- Province: South Sulawesi
- Regency: Bantaeng Regency
- District: Uluere District
- Elevation: 4,357 ft (1,328 m)

Population (2010)
  - Total: 1,443
- Time zone: UTC+8 (Indonesia Central Standard Time)

Bonto Marannu is a village in Uluere district, Bantaeng Regency in South Sulawesi province. Its population is 1443.

== Climate ==
Bonto Marannu has a tropical monsoon climate (Köppen Am), bordering upon the tropical rainforest climate (Af) found to the north, and also upon a subtropical highland climate (Cwb). The driest months are in August and September, whilst the other ten months all average at least 100 millimetres or 4 inches of rain, and the three months from December to February over 500 millimetres or 20 inches. Temperatures – substantially moderated by altitude – are warm to very warm in the afternoon and pleasant by morning throughout the year.

Climate data for Bonto Marannu
Month	Jan	Feb	Mar	Apr	May	Jun	Jul	Aug	Sep	Oct	Nov	Dec	Year
Mean daily maximum °C (°F)	23.3 (73.9)	23.3 (73.9)	23.6 (74.5)	23.8 (74.8)	23.5 (74.3)	23.0 (73.4)	22.8 (73.0)	23.6 (74.5)	24.4 (75.9)	25.1 (77.2)	24.3 (75.7)	23.4 (74.1)	23.7 (74.6)
Daily mean °C (°F)	19.4 (66.9)	19.5 (67.1)	19.5 (67.1)	19.6 (67.3)	19.4 (66.9)	18.9 (66.0)	18.3 (64.9)	18.5 (65.3)	19.1 (66.4)	19.8 (67.6)	19.8 (67.6)	19.4 (66.9)	19.3 (66.7)
Mean daily minimum °C (°F)	15.5 (59.9)	15.5 (59.9)	15.5 (59.9)	15.4 (59.7)	15.4 (59.7)	14.8 (58.6)	13.8 (56.8)	13.5 (56.3)	13.9 (57.0)	14.6 (58.3)	15.4 (59.7)	15.5 (59.9)	14.9 (58.8)
Average rainfall mm (inches)	706 (27.8)	593 (23.3)	490 (19.3)	333 (13.1)	236 (9.3)	135 (5.3)	101 (4.0)	60 (2.4)	54 (2.1)	101 (4.0)	312 (12.3)	520 (20.5)	3,641 (143.4)
Source: Climate-Data.org
