= 2013 South Sulawesi gubernatorial election =

← 2008	January 22, 2013	2018 →
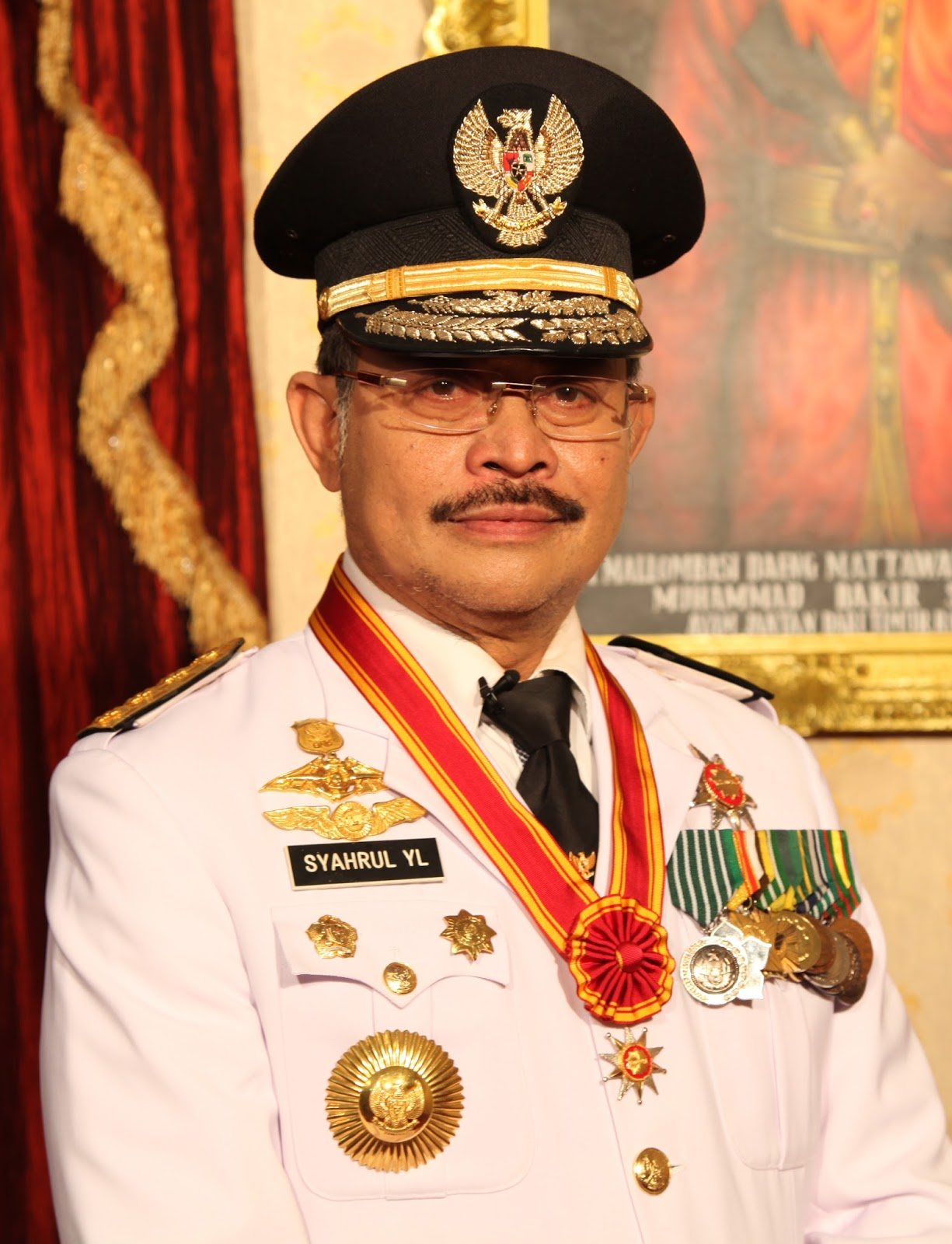

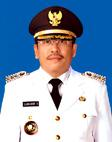
Nominee	Syahrul Yasin Limpo	Ilham Arief Sirajuddin	Andi Rudiyanto Asapa
Party	Golkar	Demokrat	Gerindra
Running mate	Agus Arifin Nu'mang	Aziz Qahhar Muzakkar	A. Nawir Pasinringi
Popular vote	2,251,407	1,785,580	257,793
Percentage	52.42%	41.57%	6.01%
Governor before election
Syahrul Yasin Limpo
Golkar
Elected Governor
Syahrul Yasin Limpo
Golkar

An election was held on 22 January 2013 for the post of Governor of the Indonesian province of South Sulawesi. The incumbent governor Syahrul Yasin Limpo of the Golkar party was re-elected with 52% of the vote. The principal opponent was Ilham Arief Sirajuddin of the Democratic Party, who obtained 42% of the vote.
