= Bonto Tangnga, Bantaeng =

Bonto Tangnga
- Location in South Sulawesi and Indonesia Bonto Tangnga (Indonesia)
- Coordinates: 5°27′54.2052″S 119°55′50.2644″E
- Country: Indonesia
- Province: South Sulawesi
- Regency: Bantaeng Regency
- District: Uluere District
- Elevation: 3,050 ft (930 m)

Population (2010)
  - Total: 1,055
- Time zone: UTC+8 (Indonesia Central Standard Time)

Bonto Tangnga is a village in Uluere district, Bantaeng Regency in South Sulawesi province. Its population is 1055.

== Climate ==
Bonto Tangnga has a tropical monsoon climate (Am) with little rainfall from August to October and heavy to very heavy rainfall in the remaining months.

Climate data for Bonto Tangnga
Month	Jan	Feb	Mar	Apr	May	Jun	Jul	Aug	Sep	Oct	Nov	Dec	Year
Mean daily maximum °C (°F)	25.2 (77.4)	25.2 (77.4)	25.6 (78.1)	26.0 (78.8)	25.8 (78.4)	25.3 (77.5)	25.3 (77.5)	26.0 (78.8)	26.8 (80.2)	27.3 (81.1)	26.4 (79.5)	25.4 (77.7)	25.9 (78.5)
Daily mean °C (°F)	21.4 (70.5)	21.5 (70.7)	21.6 (70.9)	21.8 (71.2)	21.6 (70.9)	21.0 (69.8)	20.5 (68.9)	20.7 (69.3)	21.4 (70.5)	22.0 (71.6)	22.0 (71.6)	21.5 (70.7)	21.4 (70.6)
Mean daily minimum °C (°F)	17.6 (63.7)	17.8 (64.0)	17.7 (63.9)	17.6 (63.7)	17.5 (63.5)	16.8 (62.2)	15.8 (60.4)	15.5 (59.9)	16.0 (60.8)	16.8 (62.2)	17.7 (63.9)	17.7 (63.9)	17.0 (62.7)
Average precipitation mm (inches)	577 (22.7)	441 (17.4)	374 (14.7)	285 (11.2)	232 (9.1)	133 (5.2)	102 (4.0)	40 (1.6)	46 (1.8)	75 (3.0)	280 (11.0)	418 (16.5)	3,003 (118.2)
Source: Climate-Data.org
