= Indira Chunda Thita Syahrul =

Indonesian politician (born 1979)

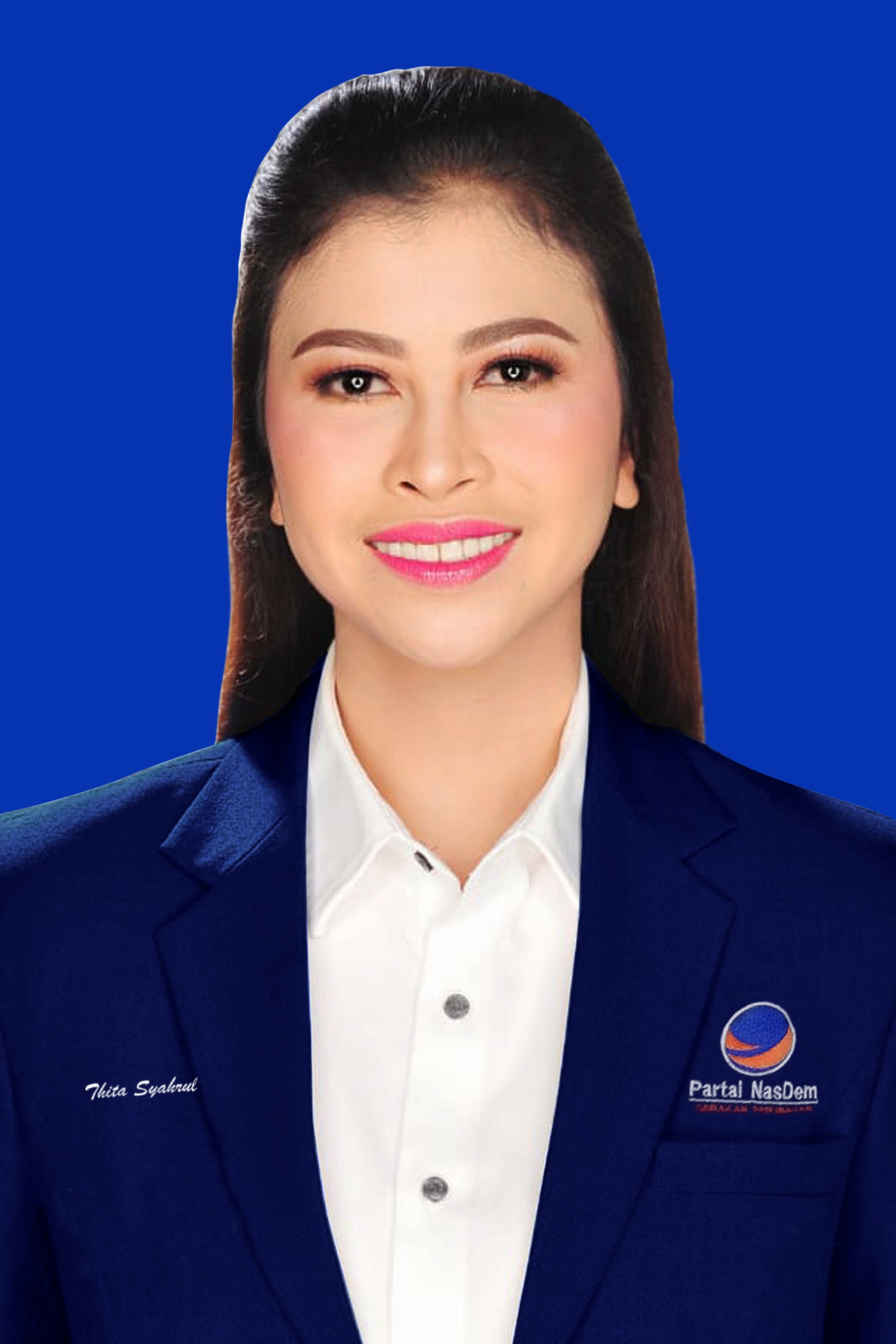

Member of the House of Representatives
- Incumbent
- Assumed office 12 September 2023; Interim replacement
- Preceded by: Muhammad Rapsel Ali
- Constituency: South Sulawesi I
- In office 1 October 2009 – 2018
- Succeeded by: M. Irwan Zulfikar
- Constituency: South Sulawesi I

Personal details
- Born: 7 April 1979 (age 47) Jakarta, Indonesia
- Party: NasDem (since 2018)
- Other political affiliations: PAN (until 2018)
- Parent: Syahrul Yasin Limpo (father)
- Education: Hasanuddin University

Indira Chunda Thita Syahrul (born 7 April 1979) is an Indonesian politician and the daughter of Syahrul Yasin Limpo. She served as member of the House of Representatives from 2009 until 2018 representing South Sulawesi I electoral district and served in the Commission IV. She studied management at the Hasanuddin University in Makassar from 1997 to 2004 and from 2005 to 2007.

Born into a family, which has dominated local politics for generations, she has become active in politics along cousins and a brother who is active in the city's parliament.
