= Nurdin Abdullah =

Indonesian politician and academic

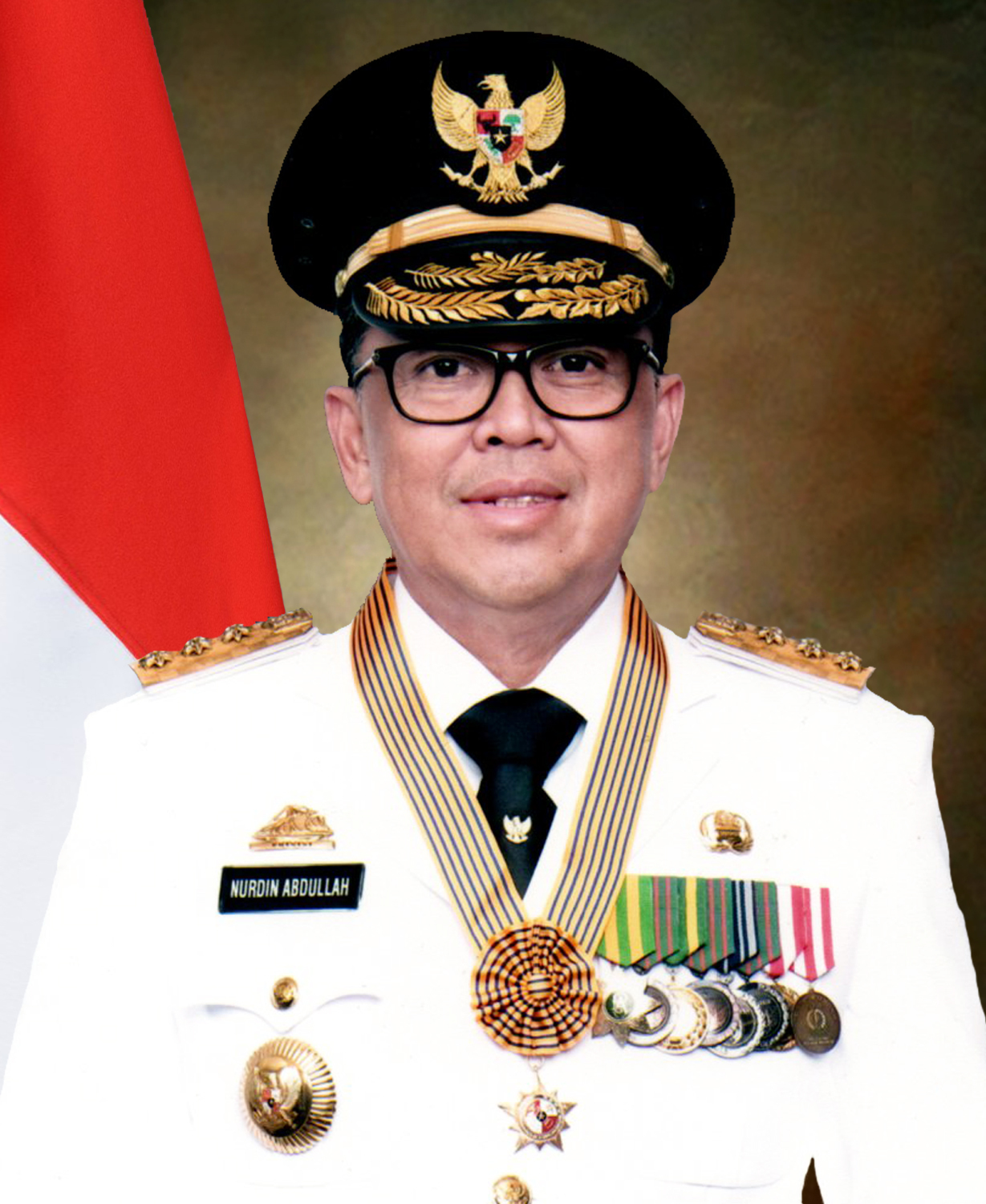

8th Governor of South Sulawesi
- In office 5 September 2018 – 26 February 2021
- Deputy: Andi Sudirman Sulaiman
- Preceded by: Syahrul Yasin Limpo
- Succeeded by: Andi Sudirman Sulaiman

Regent of Bantaeng
- In office 15 August 2008 – 15 August 2018
- Deputy: Andi Asli Mustajab; Muhammad Yasin
- Preceded by: Azikin Solthan
- Succeeded by: Ilham Azikin

Personal details
- Born: 7 February 1963 (age 63) Parepare, South Sulawesi, Indonesia
- Spouse: Liestiaty F. Nurdin
- Children: 3
- Education: Hasanuddin University; Kyushu University

Nurdin Abdullah (born 7 February 1963) is an Indonesian politician and academic who was the 8th governor of South Sulawesi and regent of Bantaeng Regency between 2008 and 2018. He was arrested for corruption in 2021, and sentenced to five years' imprisonment, though he was released in August 2023.

Born in Parepare, he studied agricultural science in Japan's Kyushu University and returned home, running his own business and teaching before becoming the regent of Bantaeng for two terms. His time as regent saw significant economic growth within the regency, in addition to improvements in health. In the last year of his second term, he participated in the province's gubernatorial election and won.

== Early life and education ==
Nurdin Abdullah was born on 7 February 1963 as the eldest child of six. His father, Andi Abdullah, was a member of the Indonesian Armed Forces. Her mother Nuareny Abdullah originated from Soppeng. He claimed that he is a descendant of the Bantaeng kings - specifically, that his grandfather was the 35th King of Bantaeng.

He went to junior high school (Sekolah Menengah Pertama/SMPN) in his hometown of Parepare, before going to Ujung Pandang for his senior high school studies, graduating in 1986. He continued his education in Hasanuddin University, studying agriculture and forestry. After obtaining his bachelor's degree, he continued to Kyushu University in Fukuoka, Japan, earning his master's degree and doctorate by 1994.

== Career ==
In 1997, he returned to South Sulawesi and established a company (PT Tokai Material Indonesia, later renamed PT Maruki Internasional) producing butsudan from wood for export to Japan in Makassar with the help of Japanese investors. He also held the post of president-director in three other Japanese companies.

=== Regent (2008–2018) ===
In 2008, Nurdin Abdullah ran with Andi Asli Mustajab in Bantaeng's regency election. The pair handily won the election, polling about 46 percent of the votes in a four-pair race in which they were supported by 10 political parties. Following the victory, Abdullah resigned from his teaching position at Hasanuddin University and from PT Maruki Internasional. They were sworn in on 6 August 2008.

When he took office, Bantaeng was one of 199 regencies across the country (and 13 in the province) to be classified as "undeveloped". Abdullah established a health service system, based on modified Nissan Elgrand cars received as aid from Japan, which was credited with significantly reducing the maternal mortality ratio. In economic terms, the regency's agricultural sector experienced a significant increase in crop yields and improved diversification under his tenure. Unemployment fell from 12 to 2.3 percent, with absolute poverty dropping from 21 to 5 percent. A 3,000-hectare industrial park was also set up, which was to include a nickel-alloy smelter. Annual income rose from IDR 5 million to IDR 27 million in 2015. Said smelter would be delayed in its operation, causing some controversy as Abdullah was accused of utilizing its (cancelled) opening as a false campaigning premise.

Implementing the lelang jabatan system also used by then-Surakarta mayor and later president Joko Widodo since 2009, Abdullah would win four Adipura awards in a row in addition to multiple other accolades from central government ministries. He was reelected in 2013, winning 84 percent of the votes. His second term expired on 15 August 2018.

He was also made a full professor at his alma mater Hasanuddin University in November 2017.

=== Governor (2018–2021) ===
In 2018, he registered to run in the province's gubernatorial election, with his tenure expiring the same year. He ran with Andi Sudirman Sulaiman, the younger brother of agriculture minister Amran Sulaiman. Supported by PDI-P, PKS and PAN, the pair would win the four-candidate election, securing victory in 16 regencies and cities within the province with a total of 1,867,303 votes (43.87%). He was sworn in by president Joko Widodo on 5 September 2018.

In 2019, a political conflict occurred when Sulaiman reassigned nearly 200 provincial government officials without approval from Abdullah. The dispute resulted in an investigation by the provincial legislature and the Ministry of Home Affairs and Sulaiman's order was rescinded.

=== Corruption charges ===
On 26 February 2021, he was arrested by the Corruption Eradication Commission. He was sentenced to five years' prison on 6 December 2021 by the Makassar Court for Corruption Crimes, and was required to pay Rp 2.2 billion + 350,000 Singaporean dollars. He was imprisoned at the Sukamiskin Prison in Bandung. After serving two-thirds of his sentence, Abdullah received a remission and was released on parole on 18 August 2023. Following his release, Abdullah joined the Perindo Party for a time, but left the party in September 2025.

== Personal life ==
Abdullah married Liestiaty Fachrudin in 1986, while he was a student at Hasanuddin. Liestaty was the daughter of Hasanuddin's rector at the time Fachrudin. She would unsuccessfully run as a Golkar candidate for the House of Representatives in 2024. Also in 2024, their son Muhammad Fathul Fauzy Nurdin Abdullah was elected regent of Bantaeng for the 2025–2030 term, defeating incumbent regent and Abdullah's successor Ilham Azikin.
