= Fathul Fauzy Nurdin =

Indonesian politician (born 1995)

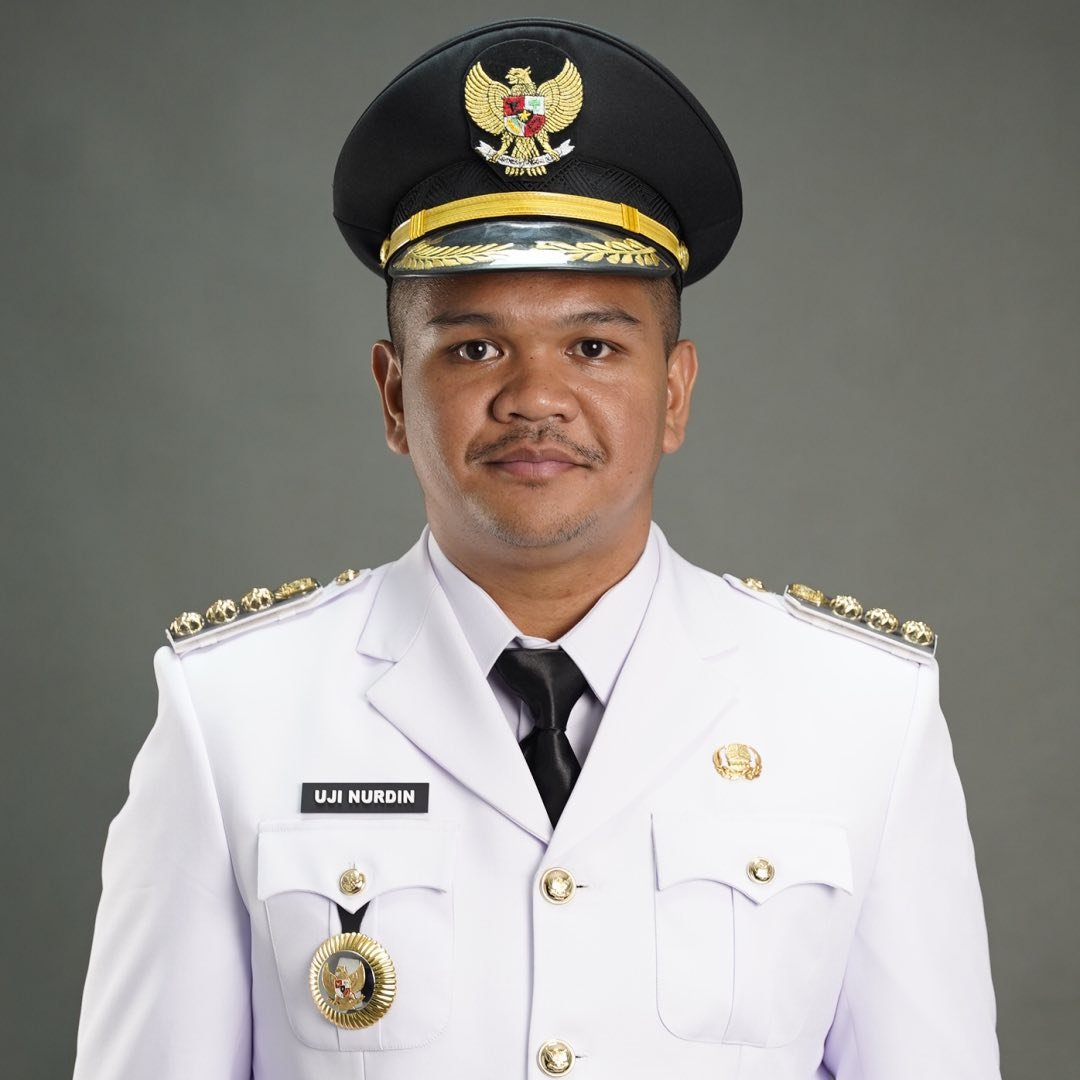
- Portrait as regent, 2025

Regent of Bantaeng
- Incumbent
- Assumed office 20 February 2025
- Preceded by: Andi Abubakar (act.); Ilham Azikin

Personal details
- Born: 30 October 1995 (age 30) Ujungpandang, South Sulawesi, Indonesia
- Party: Golkar (since 2024); PDI-P (2020–2024); PSI (2019–2020)

Muhammad Fathul Fauzy Nurdin (born 30 October 1995), popularly known as Uji Nurdin, is an Indonesian politician currently of the Golkar party who has served as regent of Bantaeng, South Sulawesi since February 2025. He is a son of Bantaeng's two-term regent and former South Sulawesi governor Nurdin Abdullah.

== Early life ==
Muhammad Fathul Fauzy Nurdin was born on 30 October 1995 in Makassar (then named Ujungpandang). He is the third and youngest child of Nurdin Abdullah and Liestiaty Fachrudin. He studied at an Islamic elementary school in Makassar before studying in Tangerang at the Al-Azhar Islamic Middle School and High School, graduating high school in 2012. He then received a bachelor's in public relations from Binus University in 2016, and later a master's in political communication from Hasanuddin University in 2022.

== Political career ==
Fathul initially joined the Indonesian Solidarity Party, and became head of the party's campaign team for the 2019 Indonesian legislative election in South Sulawesi while also running as a candidate for the provincial Regional House of Representatives. He was not elected, and the following year he opted to move to the Indonesian Democratic Party of Struggle (PDI-P). That year, he was part of the campaign team for Syamsu Rizal, PDI-P's candidate in the 2020 Makassar mayoral election. In 2021, following his father's arrest by the Corruption Eradication Commission, Fathul was examined as a witness. Within PDI-P, he became head of the party's youth wing in South Sulawesi.

In 2024, Fathul moved to the Golkar party in order to run in Bantaeng's 2024 regency election, as PDI-P held no seats in the municipal legislature to endorse his run. As his running mate was Sahabuddin of PKS, formerly Bantaeng's vice regent. In addition to Golkar and PKS, the pair was also endorsed by Gerindra. In the election, Fathul and Sahabuddin defeated 2018–2023 regent Ilham Azikin, winning 69.036 votes (57.74%). They were sworn in on 20 February 2025, with Fathul becoming the youngest active regional leader in South Sulawesi at age 29.

Under Fathul, the municipal government of Bantaeng discontinued a free school uniforms program started by his predecessor Azikin, and Fathul instead directed schools against monopolizing the sale of uniforms. He stated that the municipal government during his term would prioritize increasing farmer access to fertilizer and road improvements.

== Personal life ==
He married Gunya Paramasukhaputri, his classmate at Binus, on 12 January 2019 in Jakarta. The wedding witnesses for the couple were cabinet minister Syafruddin Kambo and Governor of Central Java Ganjar Pranowo.
