= 2024 South Sulawesi gubernatorial election =

- 27 November 2024
- Turnout: 71.78% (▲1.62pp)
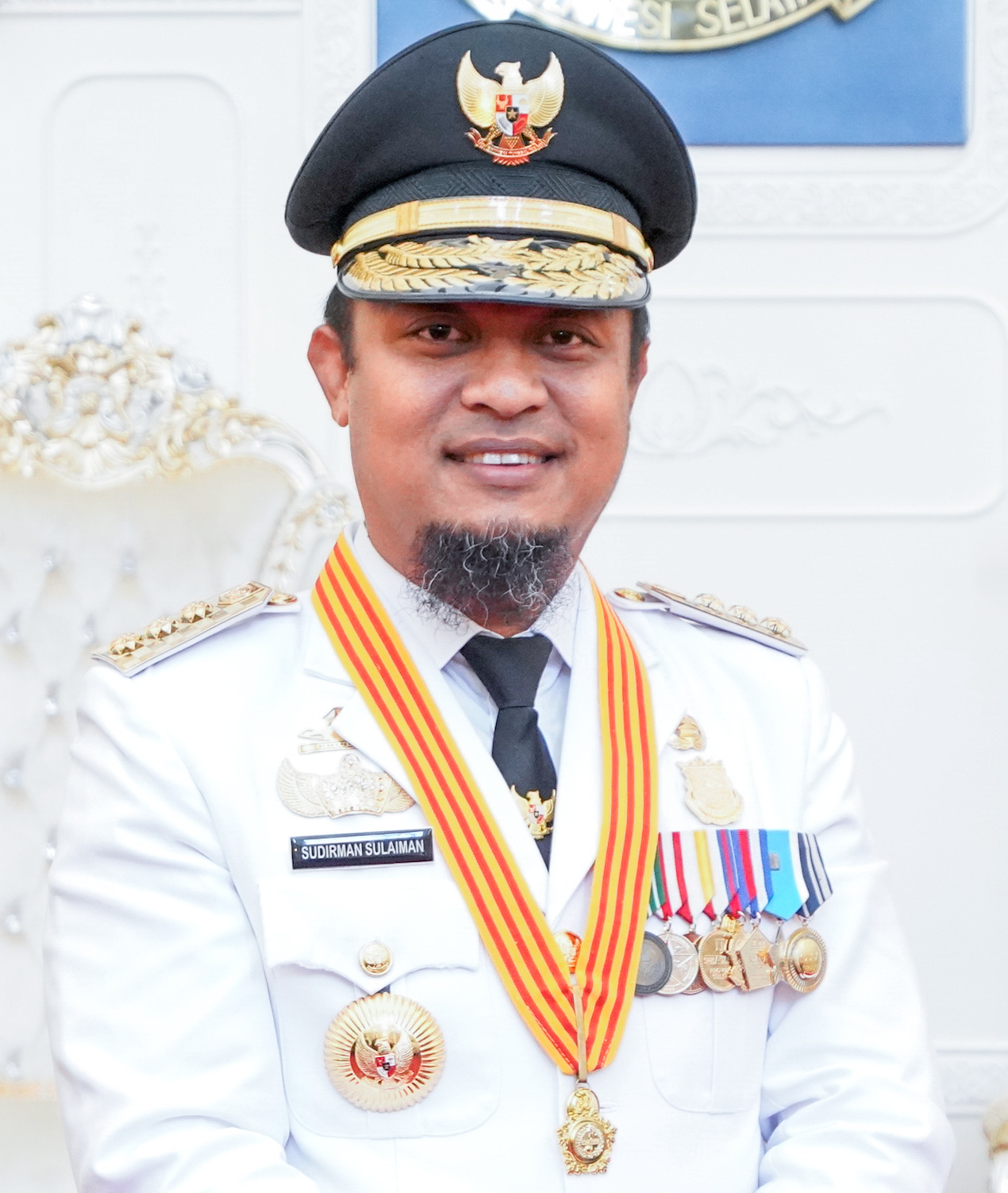

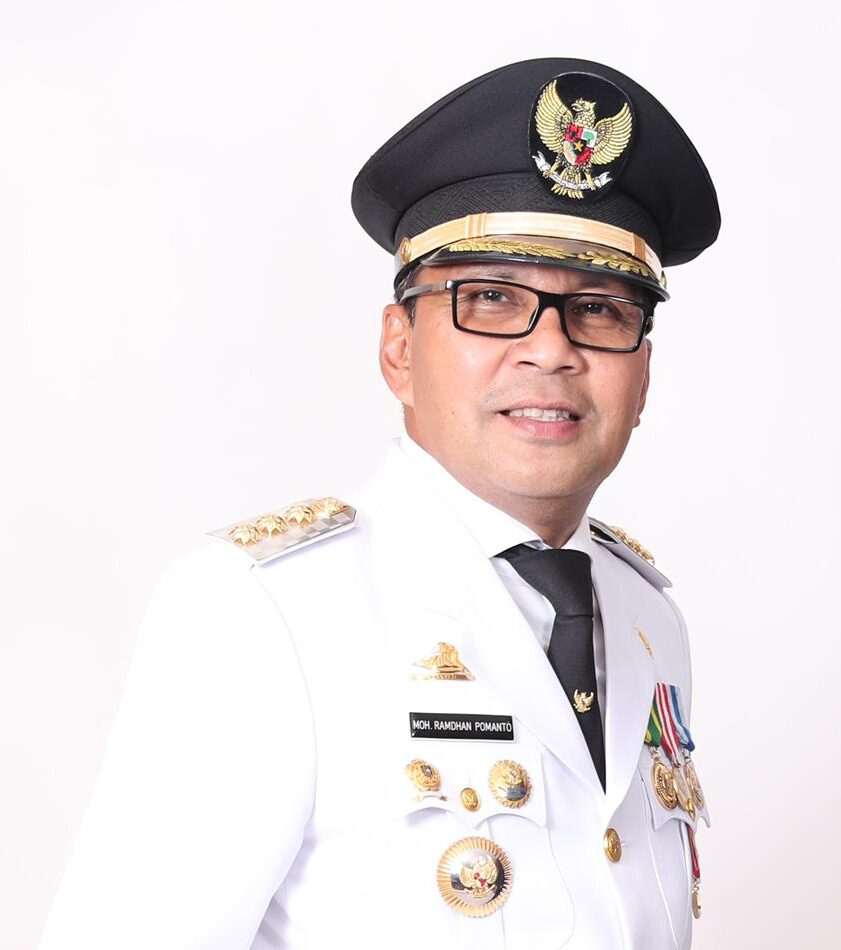
Candidate	Andi Sudirman Sulaiman	Mohammad Ramdhan Pomanto
Party	Gerindra	PDI-P
Alliance	KIM Plus	–
Running mate	Fatmawati Rusdi	Azhar Arsyad
Popular vote	3,014,255	1,600,029
Percentage	65.32%	34.68%
- Results map by district
Governor before election
Zudan Arif Fakrulloh (acting)
Independent
Elected Governor
Andi Sudirman Sulaiman
Gerindra

The 2024 South Sulawesi gubernatorial election was held on 27 November 2024 as part of nationwide local elections to elect the governor of South Sulawesi for a five-year term. The election was won by former Governor Andi Sudirman Sulaiman of the Gerindra Party with 65% of the vote. His sole opponent, Makassar Mayor Mohammad Ramdhan Pomanto of the Indonesian Democratic Party of Struggle (PDI-P), received 34%.

== Electoral system ==
The election, like other local elections in 2024, follows the first-past-the-post system where the candidate with the most votes wins the election, even if they do not win a majority. It is possible for a candidate to run uncontested, in which case the candidate is still required to win a majority of votes "against" an "empty box" option. Should the candidate fail to do so, the election will be repeated on a later date.

== Candidates ==
According to electoral regulations, in order to qualify for the election, candidates were required to secure support from a political party or a coalition of parties controlling 17 seats in the South Sulawesi Regional House of Representatives. The NasDem Party, which won 17 seats in the 2024 legislative election, was the only party eligible to nominate a gubernatorial candidate without forming a coalition. Candidates may alternatively demonstrate support in form of photocopies of identity cards, which in South Sulawesi's case corresponds to 500,294 copies. No candidates registered as an independent until the deadline had passed.

The following are individuals who have declared his/her candidacy for Governor/Vice Governor:

1
Candidate from PDIP and PKB
Danny Pomanto	Azhar Arsyad
for Governor	for Vice Governor
Mayor of Makassar (2014–2019; 2021–present)	Member of DPRD South Sulawesi (2019–2024)
Parties
22 / 85 (26%) PPP (8 seats); PKB (8 seats); PDIP (6 seats)

2
Candidate from Gerindra and Nasdem
Sudirman Sulaiman	Fatmawati Rusdi
for Governor	for Vice Governor
Governor of South Sulawesi (2022–2023)	Vice Mayor of Makassar (2021–2023)
Parties
63 / 85 (74%) Nasdem (17 seats); Golkar (14 seats); Gerindra (13 seats); Demokrat (7 seats); PKS (7 seats); PAN (4 seats); Hanura (1 seat)

=== Potential ===
The following are individuals who have either been publicly mentioned as a potential candidate by a political party in the DPRD, publicly declared their candidacy with press coverage, or considered as a potential candidate by press:

- Andi Sudirman Sulaiman, incumbent governor.
- Mohammad Ramdhan Pomanto (PDI-P), mayor of Makassar.
- Ilham Arief Sirajuddin (Golkar), former mayor of Makassar (2004–2014).

== Political map ==
Following the 2024 Indonesian general election, ten political parties are represented in the South Sulawesi Regional House of Representatives:

Political parties	Seat count
NasDem Party	17 / 85
Party of Functional Groups (Golkar)	14 / 85
Great Indonesia Movement Party (Gerindra)	13 / 85
National Awakening Party (PKB)	8 / 85
United Development Party (PPP)	8 / 85
Prosperous Justice Party (PKS)	7 / 85
Democratic Party (Demokrat)	7 / 85
Indonesian Democratic Party of Struggle (PDI-P)	6 / 85
National Mandate Party (PAN)	4 / 85
People's Conscience Party (Hanura)	1 / 85

== Results ==
Candidate	Running mate	Party	Votes	%
Andi Sudirman Sulaiman	Fatmawati Rusdi	Gerindra Party	3,014,255	65.32
Danny Pomanto	Azhar Arsyad	Indonesian Democratic Party of Struggle	1,600,029	34.68
Total			4,614,284	100.00
Valid votes			4,614,284	96.22
Invalid votes			181,453	3.78
Total votes			4,795,737	100.00
Registered voters/turnout			6,680,807	71.78
Source: KPU Sulawesi Selatan
