= Muhammad Rapsel Ali =

Indonesian politician and businessman (1971–2023)

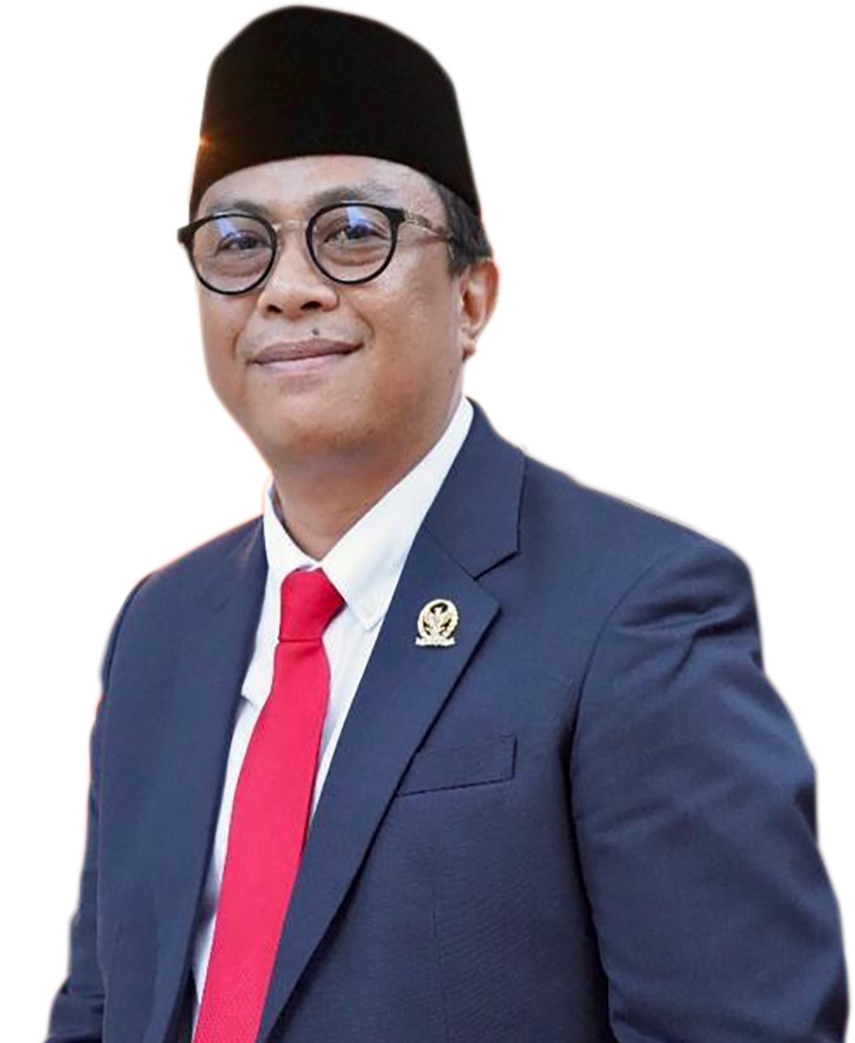
- Muhammad Rapsel Ali in 2020

Member of the House of Representatives
- In office 1 October 2019 – 9 April 2023
- Succeeded by: Indira Chunda Thita Syahrul
- Constituency: South Sulawesi I

Personal details
- Born: 6 May 1971 Selayar, South Sulawesi, Indonesia
- Died: 9 April 2023 (aged 51) Makassar, South Sulawesi, Indonesia
- Party: Nasdem (2018–2023)
- Other political affiliations: Golkar (2017–2018)
- Spouse: Siti Nur Azizah Ma'ruf
- Children: 5

Muhammad Rapsel Ali (6 May 1971 – 9 April 2023) was an Indonesian businessman and politician who served as a member of the House of Representatives between 2019 and his death in 2023 representing South Sulawesi I electoral district.

== Early life ==
Ali was born on Selayar Island on 6 May 1971. He graduated high school in Makassar in 1989. He was the first child of Muhammad Ali Gandong and Basdiaty Ali, and spent his childhood in Makassar.

== Career ==
During his business career, Ali chaired the South Sulawesi branches of the Indonesian Distributors' Association and the Indonesian Construction Businessmen Association between 1997 and 2003. He was active in the shipping and service industries, and briefly owned an event organiser company.

In 2019, Ali ran as a candidate for the People's Representative Council for South Sulawesi's 1st electoral district. He won 43,382 votes and was elected as the only NasDem Party member from the electoral district. Ali was the only one out of 575 elected legislators who had not submitted a wealth assessment by the General Elections Commission (KPU) deadline of 7 September 2019, and thus KPU had to separately provide a recommendation to the president to allow for Ali's inauguration after his late submission of the necessary documents on 10 September. Within the council, he was part of the sixth commission overseeing industry, investment, and business competition.

== Personal life and death ==
Ali married Siti Nur Azizah, the fourth daughter of the vice-president of Indonesia, Ma'ruf Amin, in 2019. He had five children. He was a fan of cruiser motorcycles, and was active in related automotive associations. He also founded a motorcycle racing team, Mandalika Racing Team Indonesia. His younger brother, Muhammad Basli Ali, served as regent of Selayar Islands Regency.

On 9 April 2023, during a visit to his constituency in Makassar, Ali experienced a sudden heart attack. Although he was rushed to a hospital, he was pronounced dead prior to arriving there. He was 51. He was buried with a military funeral the following day at the Panaikang Heroes Cemetery in Makassar.
