= Bonto Lojong, Bantaeng =

Bonto Lojong
- Location in South Sulawesi and Indonesia Bonto Lojong (Indonesia)
- Coordinates: 5°23′39.1668″S 119°56′40.7652″E
- Country: Indonesia
- Province: South Sulawesi
- Regency: Bantaeng Regency
- District: Uluere District
- Elevation: 6,630 ft (2,020 m)

Population (2010)
  - Total: 2,719
- Time zone: UTC+8 (Indonesia Central Standard Time)

Bonto Lojong is a village in Uluere district, Bantaeng Regency in South Sulawesi province. Its population is 2719.

== Climate ==
Bonto Lojong has a subtropical highland climate (Cfb) with moderate rainfall in August and September and heavy to very heavy rainfall in the remaining months with extremely heavy rainfall in January. It is the wettest place in Sulawesi island and the high rainfall is due to orographic lift.

Climate data for Bonto Lojong
Month	Jan	Feb	Mar	Apr	May	Jun	Jul	Aug	Sep	Oct	Nov	Dec	Year
Mean daily maximum °C (°F)	19.8 (67.6)	19.9 (67.8)	20.2 (68.4)	20.1 (68.2)	19.6 (67.3)	18.9 (66.0)	18.6 (65.5)	19.4 (66.9)	20.4 (68.7)	21.4 (70.5)	20.6 (69.1)	19.9 (67.8)	19.9 (67.8)
Daily mean °C (°F)	15.7 (60.3)	15.8 (60.4)	15.9 (60.6)	15.8 (60.4)	15.6 (60.1)	15.0 (59.0)	14.4 (57.9)	14.7 (58.5)	15.3 (59.5)	16.1 (61.0)	16.0 (60.8)	15.8 (60.4)	15.5 (59.9)
Mean daily minimum °C (°F)	11.6 (52.9)	11.7 (53.1)	11.7 (53.1)	11.6 (52.9)	11.7 (53.1)	11.1 (52.0)	10.2 (50.4)	10.0 (50.0)	10.2 (50.4)	10.9 (51.6)	11.5 (52.7)	11.7 (53.1)	11.2 (52.1)
Average precipitation mm (inches)	736 (29.0)	632 (24.9)	515 (20.3)	356 (14.0)	237 (9.3)	137 (5.4)	102 (4.0)	76 (3.0)	66 (2.6)	119 (4.7)	326 (12.8)	546 (21.5)	3,848 (151.5)
Source: Climate-Data.org
