= Amran Sulaiman =

Indonesian businessman and politician (born 1968)

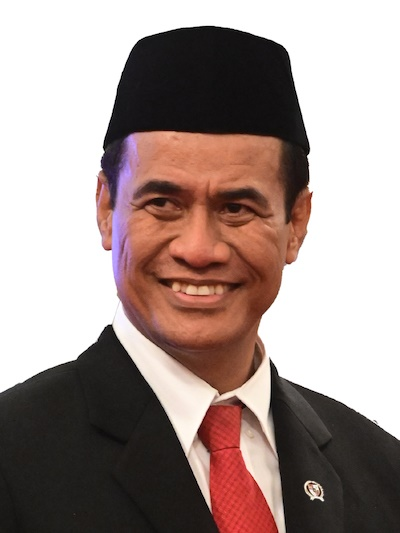

27th Minister of Agriculture
- Incumbent
- Assumed office 25 October 2023
- President: Joko Widodo; Prabowo Subianto
- Deputy: Harvick Qolbi (2020–2024); Sudaryono (2024–2026); Alim Setiawan (2026–)
- Preceded by: Syahrul Yasin Limpo; Arief Prasetyo Adi (acting)
- In office 27 October 2014 – 21 October 2019
- President: Joko Widodo
- Preceded by: Suswono
- Succeeded by: Syahrul Yasin Limpo

Personal details
- Born: 27 April 1968 (age 58) Bone, South Sulawesi, Indonesia
- Party: Independent (until 2025); PPP (2025–presents)
- Spouse: Martati
- Children: 4
- Relatives: Andi Asman Sulaiman (brother); Andi Sudirman Sulaiman (brother); Haji Isam (cousin)
- Education: Hasanuddin University

Andi Amran Sulaiman (born 27 April 1968) is an Indonesian businessman and Minister of Agriculture, who has served under Joko Widodo and Prabowo Subianto's governments from 27 October 2014 to 23 October 2019 and again since 25 October 2023. Prior to becoming minister, he was the leader of Tiran Group, a Makassar-based conglomerate operating mostly in Eastern Indonesia making him the wealthiest minister appointed to the new cabinet.

Born in Bone, South Sulawesi, his education and the bulk of his career revolved around agriculture, with him being listed as a lecturer on agricultural sciences in the state-operated Hasanuddin University.

== Early life and education ==
=== Early life ===
Sulaiman was the third child of twelve from father Andi B. Sulaiman Dahlan Petta Linta, a veteran, and mother Andi Nurhadi Petta Bau. While he was born in Bone, he spent most of his early childhood in neighboring Barru where he lived for 7 years and first went to elementary school. Later, he returned to Bone where he finished his first 12 years of basic education, graduating from a state-funded high school in Lappariaja in 1989.

=== Education ===
Upon the completion of his basic studies, Sulaiman studied agricultural science in Makassar's Hasanuddin University, starting in 1988 and obtaining his undergraduate degree in 1993. He would continue to obtain his master's and postgraduate degree from the same university in 2003 and 2012 respectively, all in the same subject. He graduated with the maximum GPA, and patented multiple inventions which covered pest control. He currently holds 5 patent rights, in addition to being listed as a lecturer at Hasanuddin.

His brother Andi Sudirman Sulaiman was elected vice governor of South Sulawesi in the 2018 election, as a deputy of Nurdin Abdullah.

== Business career ==
Upon his graduation, Sulaiman worked for the Indonesian National Agricultural Company or PTPN (more precisely, PTPN XIV). He began his career as a head of field operations in a sugar factory in 1994, and was promoted 4 times throughout his first six years in the company, peaking as the chief of logistics. He resigned after 15 years. Later on, he founded his own business, beginning with his patent on rat poison (named "Tiran" as an acronym of Tikus diracun Amran i.e. Amran poisons rats) and expanded rapidly, covering 10 companies with combined annual revenues approaching US$1 billion by 2014. He received a civil award Satyalencana Pembangunan from Indonesian president Susilo Bambang Yudhoyono in 2007.

== Political career ==
=== Minister of Agriculture ===
Joko Widodo announced his appointment as Minister of Agriculture on 26 October 2014, and he was sworn in the following day. He was then the minister with the highest reported net worth, which was valued at Rp 330.8 billion (US$27.3 million) in November 2014. His ministry's target was set as self-sufficiency in 4 key food commodities i.e. rice, corn, soybeans and sugar within 3 years in addition to improvements of irrigation systems in 11 Indonesian provinces. He managed to survive two cabinet reshuffles by Widodo, which was done in 2015 and 2016 respectively despite initial rumors of his replacement.

On 25 October 2023, Sulaiman replaced the position left by Syahrul Yasin Limpo as Minister of Agriculture for being a corruption case suspect.

== Personal life ==
He married Martati and the couple has four children – all with Andi as a first name. According to genealogical records, Sulaiman is a distant descendant of the 23rd king of Bone.

== See also ==
- Susi Pudjiastuti
