= National Food Agency =

Government agency of Indonesia

- Badan Pangan Nasional
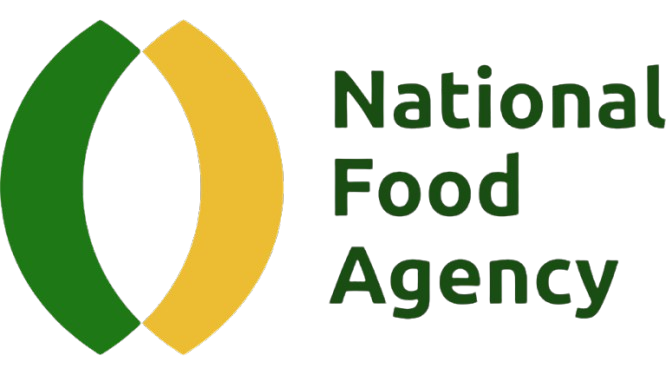

Agency overview
- Formed: 2021
- Headquarters: South Jakarta, Jakarta, Indonesia
- Agency executive: Amran Sulaiman, Head of Bapanas/NFA
- Website: badanpangan.go.id

The National Food Agency (Indonesian: Badan Pangan Nasional; Bapanas/NFA) is a non-ministerial government agency in Indonesia responsible for carrying out government duties in the food sector, including coordinating, formulating, setting, and implementing policies regarding food availability, supply and price stabilization, food and nutrition security, food consumption diversification, and food safety. These governmental functions were previously scattered across various ministries before being streamlined into the agency.

Established on 29 July 2021, through Presidential Regulation Number 66 of 2021, the National Food Agency succeeded the Food Security Agency (BPK) and inherited its functions and tasks. The head of the agency is directly responsible to the President of Indonesia. The types of food that fall under the agency's jurisdiction include rice, corn, soybeans, sugar for consumption, onion, poultry eggs, ruminant meat, poultry meat, and chili.

== History ==
In 1999, the Agency for Food Security Affairs (BUKP) was established through Presidential Decree Number 136 of 1999 with its tasks including developing food security policies based on the directives of the Minister of Agriculture. By the following year, the BUKP was merged with the Secretariat for Control (Setdal) to form the Food Security and Resilience Agency (BBKP) through Presidential Decree Number 177 of 2000.

Through regulations Minister of Agriculture Regulation Number 61 of 2010, Presidential Regulation Number 45 of 2015, and Minister of Agriculture Regulation Number 40 of 2015, The Food Security and Resilience Agency (BBKP) was transformed into the Food Security Agency (BKP) and assigned the responsibilities of coordinating and formulating policies to strengthen food security and diversification.

On 29 July 2021, then-President Joko Widodo officially established the National Food Agency through Presidential Regulation Number 66 of 2021, assuming the responsibilities and functions of the BPK and tasked with executing government duties in the food sector.

== List of Heads ==
No.	Portrait	Name	Start of Term	End of Term	Party	Ref.
1		Arief Prasetyo Adi	21 February 2022	9 October 2025	Independent	
2		Andi Amran Sulaiman	9 October 2025	Incumbent	Independent	
