= Andi Sudirman Sulaiman =

Indonesian politician

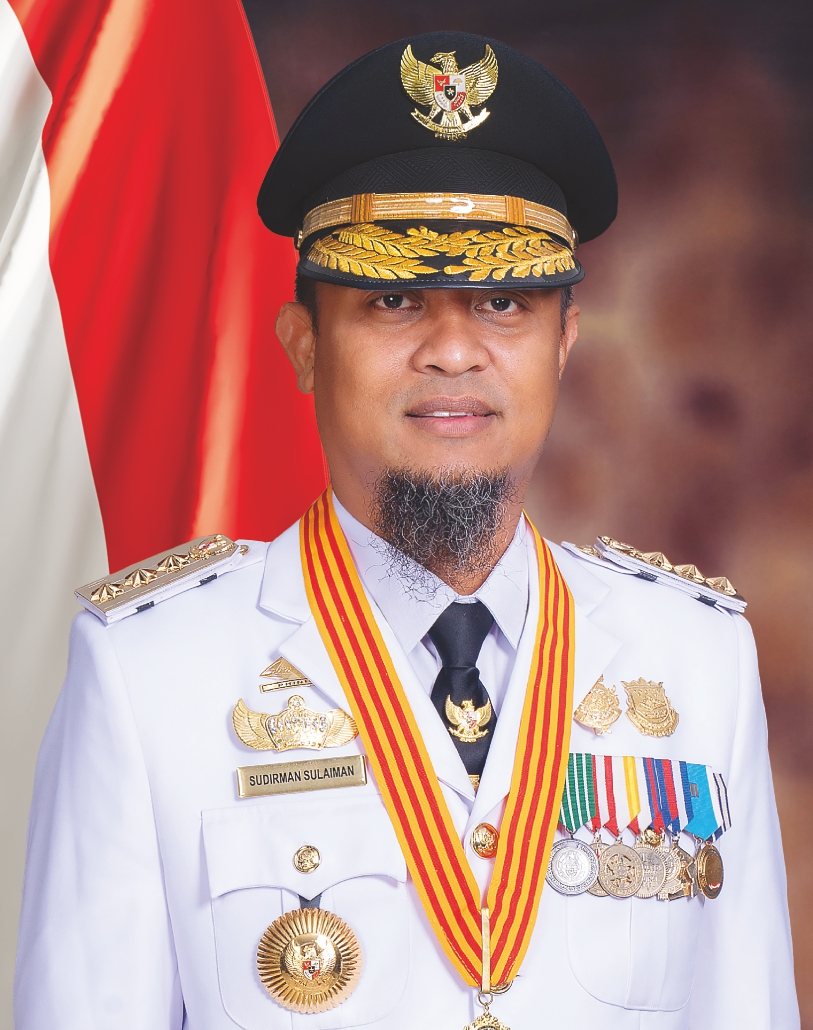

Governor of South Sulawesi
- Incumbent
- Assumed office 20 February 2025
- Deputy: Fatmawati
- Preceded by: Fadjry Djufry (acting)
- In office 10 March 2022 – 5 September 2023
- Preceded by: Nurdin Abdullah
- Succeeded by: Bahtiar Baharuddin (acting)

Vice Governor of South Sulawesi
- In office 5 September 2018 – 10 March 2022
- Preceded by: Agus Arifin Nu'mang
- Succeeded by: Fatwati Rusdi (2025)

Personal details
- Born: 25 September 1983 (age 42) Bone, South Sulawesi, Indonesia

Andi Sudirman Sulaiman (born 25 September 1983) is an Indonesian politician who currently serves as the Governor of South Sulawesi, serving since February 2025. He had previously been elected as Vice Governor in 2018 and was elevated to acting governor when governor Nurdin Abdullah was arrested in 2022, and served the rest of Abdullah's term until 2023.

== Early life and education ==
Sulaiman was born in Bone Regency on 25 September 1983, as the eleventh of twelve siblings. One of his siblings is Amran Sulaiman, a businessman who served as the Minister of Agriculture under Joko Widodo's first presidency. His father served as a corporal in the Indonesian Army. He pursued basic education within the regency, graduating from high school in 2001 before studying mechanical engineering at Hasanuddin University in Makassar.

During his time at Hasanuddin University, Sulaiman founded a student organization based in Bone and won a scholarship from Thiess Contractors Indonesia. He graduated with a bachelor's degree in 2005.

== Career ==
After graduating, Sulaiman began working in a number of foreign companies, typically operating in marine engineering services. He was selected to be running mate to Nurdin Abdullah in the 2018 South Sulawesi gubernatorial election. The pair won the election with over 40 percent of the votes in a four-candidate race. He was sworn in as vice governor on 5 September 2018.

In 2019, a political conflict occurred when Sulaiman reassigned nearly 200 provincial government officials without approval from Abdullah. The dispute resulted in an investigation by the provincial legislature and the Ministry of Home Affairs and Sulaiman's order was rescinded.

Abdullah was arrested by the Corruption Eradication Commission in February 2021, and on 28 February 2021 Sulaiman was elevated to acting governor. In November 2021, he began requiring Muslim civil servants to read the Quran at the start of the workday and to attend congregational prayers upon adhan. On 10 March 2022, Sulaiman was appointed as full Governor of South Sulawesi.

== Honours ==
- Satyalancana Wira Karya - 2023
- Lencana Melati Gerakan Pramuka
