= Bersujud Airport =

Airport in Batu Licin, Indonesia

Bersujud Airport Bandar Udara Bersujud
- IATA: BTW; ICAO: WAOC

Summary
- Airport type: Public
- Owner: Government of Indonesia
- Operator: Indonesian Ministry of Transportation
- Serves: Batulicin
- Location: Tanah Bumbu Regency, South Kalimantan, Indonesia
- Elevation AMSL: 20 ft / 6 m
- Coordinates: 3°24′45″S 116°0′0″E

Map
- Location of airport in Kalimantan

Runways
Direction	Length		Surface
Direction	m	ft	Surface
09/27	1,800	5,906	Asphalt

Bersujud Airport (IATA: BTW, ICAO: WAOC) is an airport in Batu Licin, South Kalimantan, Indonesia.

== Airlines and destinations ==
Airlines	Destinations
Wings Air	Banjarmasin, Makassar
