= Syahrul Yasin Limpo =

Indonesian politician (born 1955)

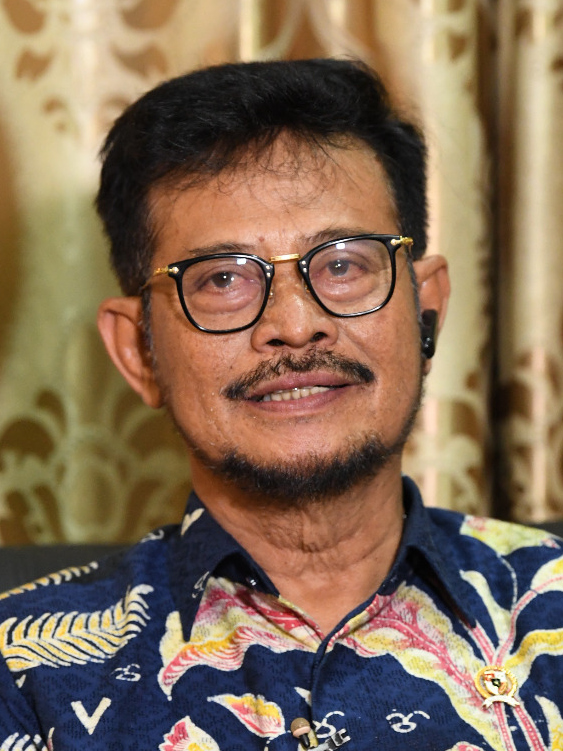
- Limpo in 2019

28th Minister of Agriculture
- In office 23 October 2019 – 6 October 2023
- President: Joko Widodo
- Preceded by: Amran Sulaiman
- Succeeded by: Arief Prasetyo Adi (acting); Amran Sulaiman

7th Governor of South Sulawesi
- In office 8 April 2008 – 8 April 2018
- Deputy: Agus Arifin Nu'mang
- Preceded by: Amin Sjam
- Succeeded by: Soni Sumarsono (Acting); Nurdin Abdullah

6th Vice Governor of South Sulawesi
- In office 20 January 2003 – 19 January 2008
- Governor: Amin Sjam
- Succeeded by: Agus Arifin Nu'mang

7th Regent of Gowa
- In office 1994–2002
- Governor: Zainal Basri Palaguna
- Preceded by: Azis Umar
- Succeeded by: Hasbullah Djabar

Personal details
- Born: Syahrul Yasin Limpo; 16 March 1955 (age 71) Makassar, South Sulawesi, Indonesia
- Citizenship: Indonesian
- Party: Nasdem (after 2018)
- Other political affiliations: Golkar (before 2018)
- Spouse: Ayunsri Harahap
- Children: Indira Chunda Thita Syahrul Putri; Kemal Redindo Syahrul Putra; Rinra Sujiwa Syahrul Putra
- Education: Hasanuddin University
- Occupation: Politician

Syahrul Yasin Limpo (born 16 March 1955) is an Indonesian politician, who served as Minister of Agriculture in Joko Widodo's Onward Cabinet from October 2019 until the Corruption Eradication Commission (KPK) announced his involvement in alleged corruption in September 2023. He was governor of South Sulawesi from 2008 to 2018.

He switched political parties in March 2018, leaving Golkar to join Nasdem, led by Surya Paloh.

== Political career ==
In 2016, Limpo ran for the leadership of the Golkar Party but lost to Setya Novanto. After a 2017 meeting with Imam Muhammad ibn Saud Islamic University rector Sulaiman ibn Abdullah Abalkhail, Limpo helped facilitate the opening of a Saudi-funded university in South Sulawesi.

In 2017, Limpo oversaw a controversial project in the province to create five artificial islands to increase public space at Makassar. Opposition came from environmental organizations which filed a lawsuit and local fishermen who attempted to physically block the construction, claiming the project would deplete fish stocks.

On 2 September 2022, Riezky Aprilia was reported to the Honorary Court of the DPR (MKD) for remarking to the Minister of Agriculture, Limpo, that he was taking the "wrong medicine" during a work meeting. She criticised him and then provided him with an explanation of her remarks, acknowledging that she had just used language rhetorical methods to show her disdain for him.

== Controversies ==
Corruption Eradication Commission announced his involvement in alleged corruption on 29 September 2023. At the time of his announcement, he was on an official trip to Italy and Spain. Deputy Minister of Agriculture, Harvick Hasnul Qolbi, revealed that Limpo separated from the Ministry of Agriculture entourage after learning his status after KPK announced him as a suspect. As revealed by the Directorate General of Immigration, his official trip supposedly ended on 30 September 2023, and he should return on 1 October 2023. Since he had not returned after the trip, he was declared missing. His disappearance was eventually confirmed by Yasonna Laoly, who oversees the Directorate General of Immigration's operations. Laoly expressed that his ministry was not responsible for bringing Limpo back, but the Police and KPK would handle his return.

Since his disappearance, Surya Paloh, requested him to return immediately and to cooperate with law enforcement. Limpo eventually returned and reported himself to Paloh and expected to report himself to Joko Widodo on 5 October 2023. Nasdem Party confirmed that Limpo resigned from his post as minister on 5 October 2023. Limpo reported himself to Ministry of the State Secretariat on the same day submitted his resignation according to the protocol, ending his tenure as minister. On 6 October 2023, Limpo replaced with Arief Prasetyo Adi, head of the National Food Agency, as acting minister.

On 11 July 2024, he was sentenced to 10 years imprisonment in a corruption case, with IDR 300 million in fines and replacement money totaling IDR 14,147,144,786 (IDR 14.1 billion) and US$30,000.
