= Syamsudin Noor International Airport =

Airport in Banjarmasin, Kalimantan, Indonesia

Syamsudin Noor International Airport Bandar Udara Internasional Syamsudin Noor
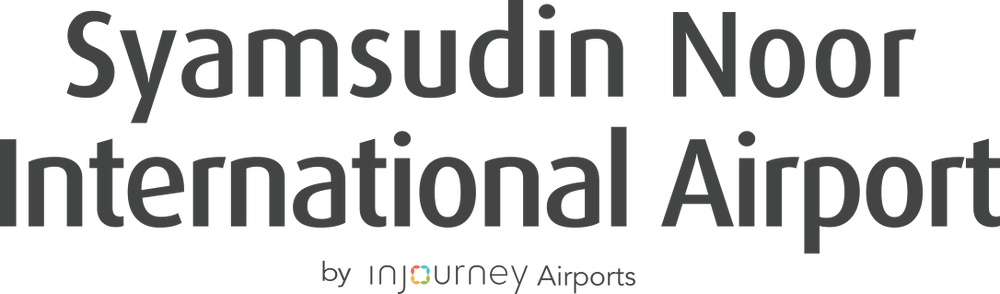

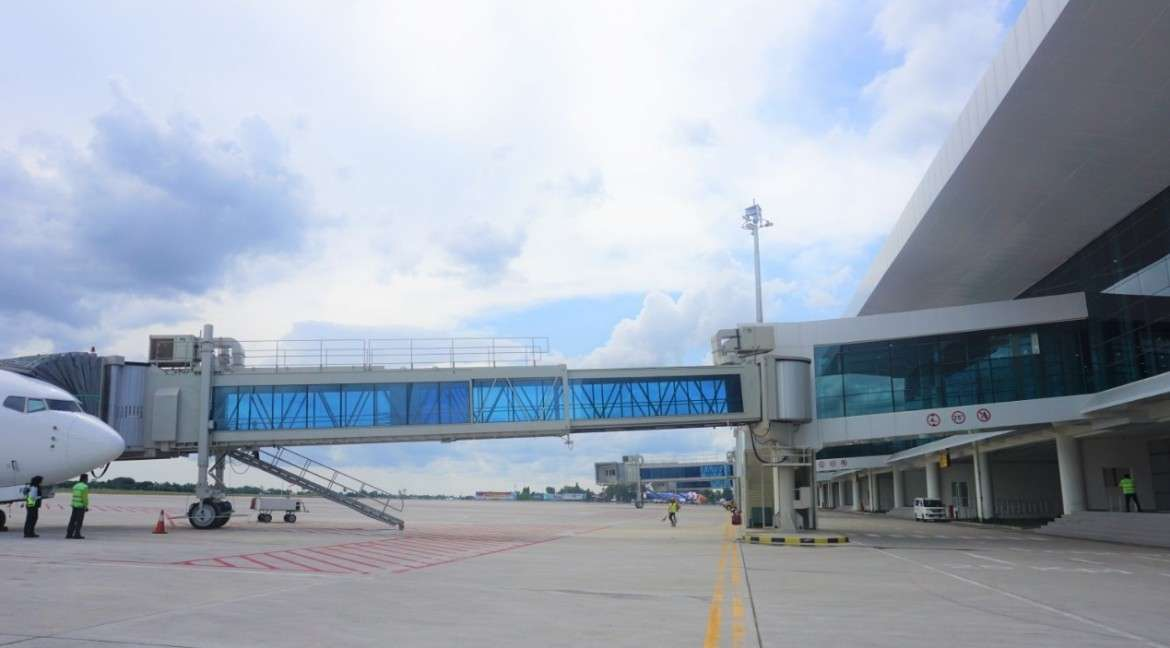
- IATA: BDJ; ICAO: WAOO; WMO: 96685

Summary
- Airport type: Public / Military
- Owner: Government of Indonesia
- Operator: InJourney Airports
- Serves: Banjarmasin
- Location: Banjarbaru, South Kalimantan, Indonesia
- Operating base for: Susi Air; Wings Air
- Time zone: WITA (UTC+08:00)
- Elevation AMSL: 66 ft (20 m)
- Coordinates: 03°26′32″S 114°45′45″E
- Website: www.syamsudinnoor-airport.co.id

Maps
- Kalimantan region in Indonesia

- Location of airport in South Kalimantan / Indonesia BDJ/WAOO (Indonesia) BDJ/WAOO (Southeast Asia) BDJ/WAOO (Asia)

Runways
Direction	Length		Surface
Direction	m	ft	Surface
10/28	2,500	8,202	Asphalt

Statistics (2024)
- Passengers: 3,132,529 (▼4.1%)
- Cargo (tonnes): 33,045 (▲25.7%)
- Aircraft movements: 26,741 (▲0.9%)
- Source: DGCA

Syamsudin Noor International Airport (IATA: BDJ, ICAO: WAOO), formerly Ulin Airport, is an international airport serving Banjarmasin in South Kalimantan, Indonesia. It is located in the district of Landasan Ulin, 5 km (3.1 mi) west of Banjarbaru, the capital of South Kalimantan, and about 25 km (16 mi) southeast from the center of the city of Banjarmasin, the largest city of South Kalimantan. Named after Syamsudin Noor, an Indonesian Air Force officer from South Kalimantan, the airport serves as the primary gateway to Banjarmasin and the wider South Kalimantan region. It offers regular flights to major Indonesian cities such as Jakarta, Semarang, and Surabaya, as well as to key cities in Kalimantan including Balikpapan. The airport also supports rural air services to remote areas in the island’s interior. Currently, the airport serves scheduled international flights to Kuala Lumpur and occasionally operates seasonal flights to Jeddah to accommodate Hajj pilgrims traveling to Mecca.

In addition to functioning as a commercial airport, it also hosts the Syamsudin Noor Air Force Base, a Type-B facility operated by the Indonesian Air Force.

== History ==
=== Colonial era ===
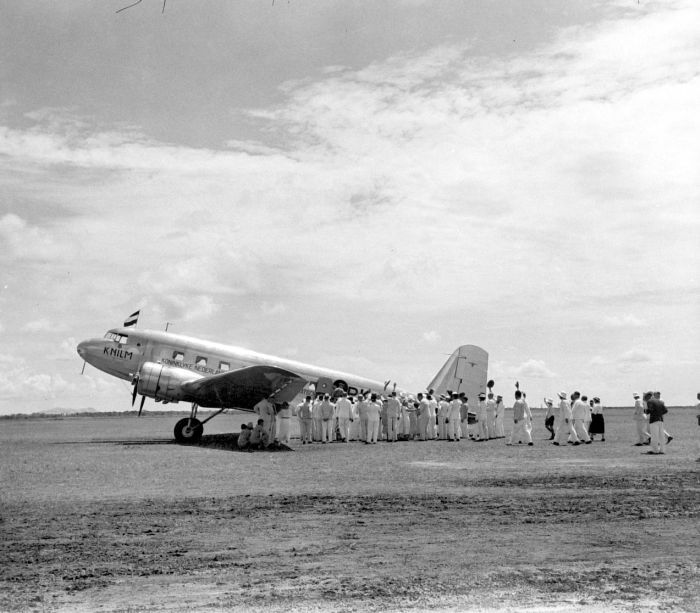
A KNILM Douglas DC-2 landing at Oelin Airfield during a test flight, 1936

Prior to the construction of the current airport, a small airstrip already existed in Banjarmasin, located in what is now Sungai Tabuk in Banjar Regency. The airstrip was built in the 1920s and was initially intended to serve the Koninklijke Nederlandsch-Indische Luchtvaart Maatschappij (KNILM), the national carrier of the Dutch East Indies. Its development was part of a broader plan to connect Banjarmasin with Java by air, through a route linking Surabaya – Banjarmasin– Hulu Sungai – Balikpapan, and vice versa. To support this initiative, KNILM began searching for a suitable site for an airfield that could be developed at relatively low cost, eventually identifying Sungai Tabuk as a viable location. As part of its promotional efforts, the airline enlisted the renowned French aviator Étienne Poulet to conduct demonstration flights over the Banjarmasin area. His aircraft landed on a sandy site at Sungai Tabuk, approximately 12 kilometres from Banjarmasin. Air services linking Java, Kalimantan, and surrounding regions were prioritized to accelerate regional development and attract tourists to the island. However, the Sungai Tabuk airfield was ultimately not utilized due to delays in securing operational approval for KNILM. A cooperation agreement between the Dutch East Indies government and KNILM was eventually reached on 24 October 1928, following the signing of an earlier agreement on 16 July 1928. For various reasons, the Sungai Tabuk site was subsequently abandoned, and plans for the airfield were relocated to Oelin.

Oelin Airfield was originally built in 1936 by the Dutch colonial government as a military base for the Royal Netherlands East Indies Air Force (ML-KNIL). The first aircraft to land at the airfield was a KNILM-operated Douglas DC-2, arriving from Surabaya via Bandung. Following the outbreak of World War II and the occupation of the Netherlands by Nazi Germany, the airfield was upgraded in anticipation of a Japanese invasion, including the addition of three Lewis anti aircraft guns.

The airbase was considered a strategic target by the Japanese during the early stages of their 1942 invasion of the Dutch East Indies, as it was located just 420 kilometers from Surabaya. Its proximity made it a key objective in Japan’s plan to neutralize Allied air power in Java. The airfield sustained damage during the invasion and was subsequently captured by Japanese forces following the Battle of Banjarmasin on 10 February 1942 with very minimal resistance, as the defenders has mostly fled. The Dutch significantly damaged the airfield prior to withdrawing to Java, leaving it inoperable until 25 February. After being repaired by Japanese engineers, the airfield became a base of the Imperial Japanese Navy Air Service and was used as a staging point for operations in Java and Bali.

In 1944, the Japanese upgraded the airfield to support their military operations against the Allies. At that time, it featured a single runway measuring 2,220 meters in length and 45 meters in width. The airfield was raided by Allied aircraft throughout the remainder of the war. Nevertheless, the Japanese retained control of the base until their surrender in 1945, after which it was reclaimed by the returning Dutch authorities.

Following the return of Dutch forces to Banjarmasin, the Netherlands Indies Civil Administration (NICA) undertook minor renovations, including reinforcing the runway with a new 10-centimeter-thick foundation. During the Indonesian National Revolution, the area surrounding the airfield was heavily infiltrated by Indonesian guerrillas, prompting the Dutch to launch clearing operations. Some guerrillas also attempted to sabotage the airfield.

=== Independence era ===
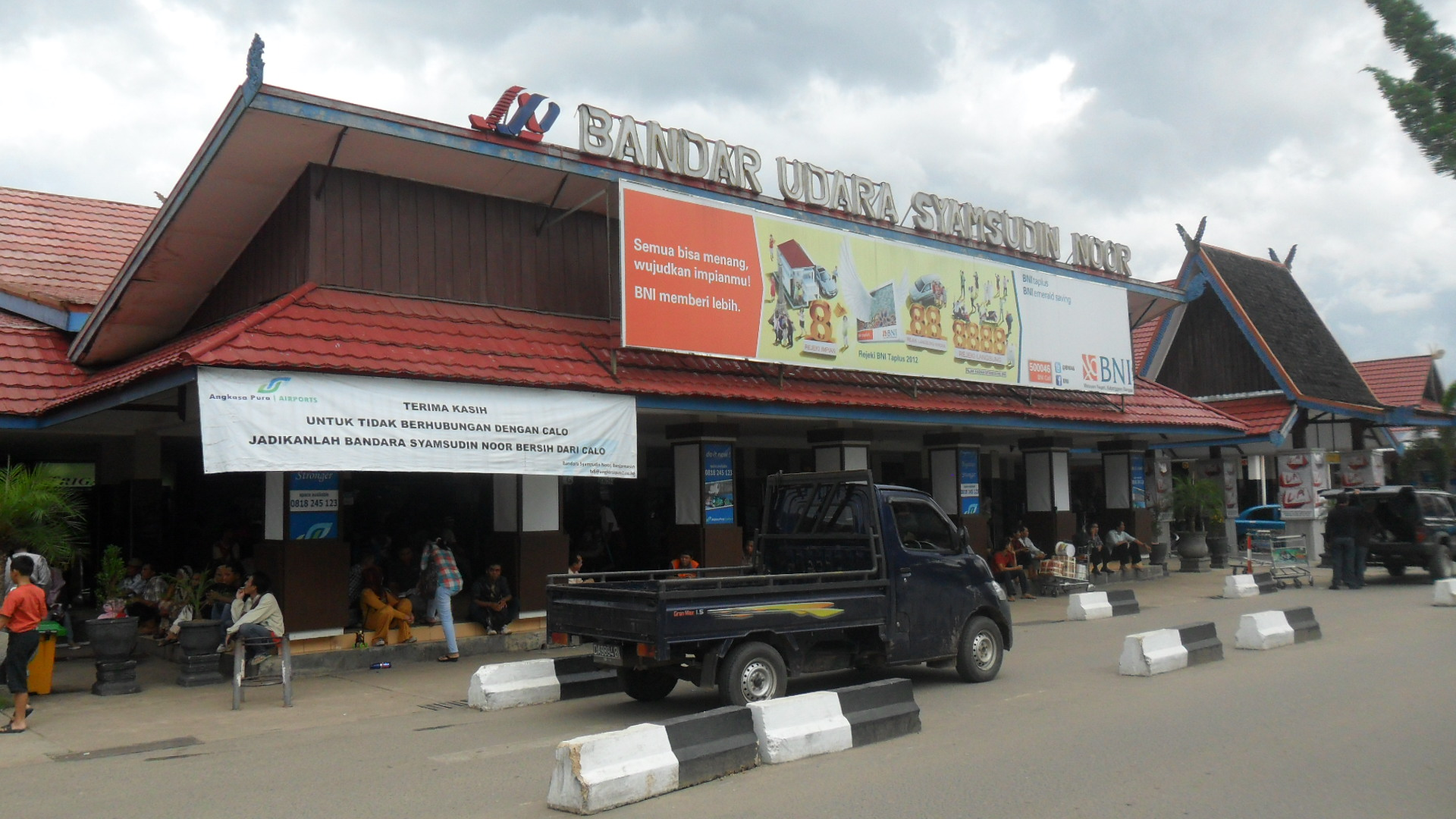
Former terminal of Syamsudin Noor International Airport, 2012

After the Dutch departure following the transfer of sovereignty, the airport was transferred to the Indonesian government, which recognized its strategic value and began gradual development efforts. The airport was upgraded by the Indonesian government in the 1950s to meet international standards, enabling it to accommodate aircraft such as the Convair CV-240 family.

In 1970, the airfield was renamed Syamsudin Noor Airport, in honor of Syamsudin Noor—a revolutionary and Indonesian Air Force pilot from South Kalimantan who died in a crash on Mount Galunggung during a flight from Bandung to Tasikmalaya. His remains are interred at Cikutra Heroes Cemetery in Bandung. Between 1974 and 1977, the runway was extended to accommodate larger aircraft such as the Fokker F28 and the Douglas DC-9. Initially operating solely as an Indonesian Air Force base, the airport was officially designated for civilian use in 1975.

In 1992, the management of the airport was transferred to Angkasa Pura I, which was later rebranded as InJourney Airports. Following runway capacity upgrades in 1994, Syamsudin Noor Airport became capable of fully accommodating Boeing 737-300 aircraft. A subsequent runway extension, completed in 2003 by the South Kalimantan provincial government, further enhanced its operational capacity, allowing it to handle Boeing 767-300ER aircraft on a limited basis. In addition, an apron was constructed to accommodate up to seven narrow-body aircraft such as the Boeing 737, along with other supporting facilities. The airport has continued to be developed up to the present, with the most recent milestone being the inauguration of a new terminal on 18 December 2019.

The airport was previously designated as an international airport; however, it did not operate regular international flights, aside from seasonal services to Jeddah, Saudi Arabia, to accommodate Hajj pilgrims traveling to Mecca. Due to the absence of consistent international traffic, the Ministry of Transportation revoked the airport’s authorization to serve international routes on 2 April 2024, although Hajj flights continue to be permitted. The airport regained its international status in May 2025, followed by the launch of its first scheduled international flight to Kuala Lumpur, Malaysia, operated by AirAsia in October 2025. Plans are also underway to introduce additional international flights to destinations such as Singapore.

== Facilities and development ==
=== Facilities ===
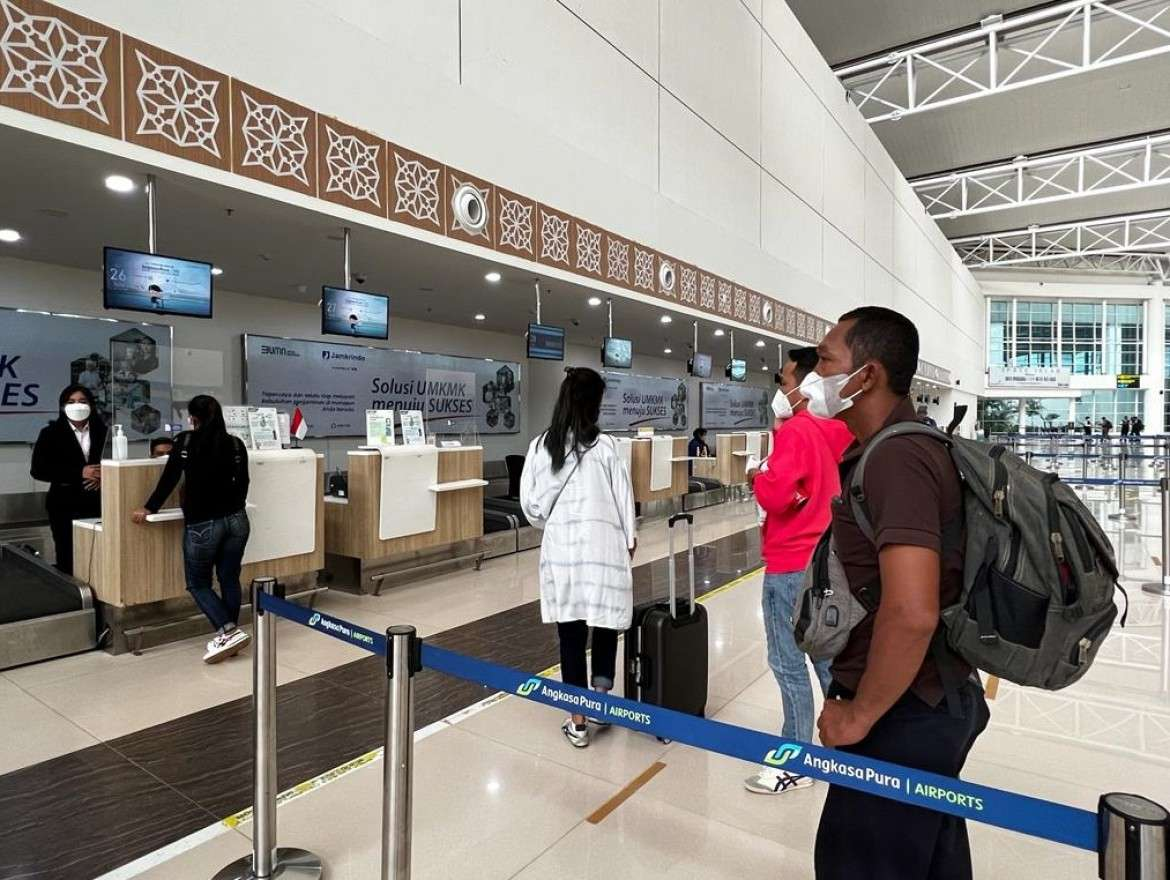
Check-in area

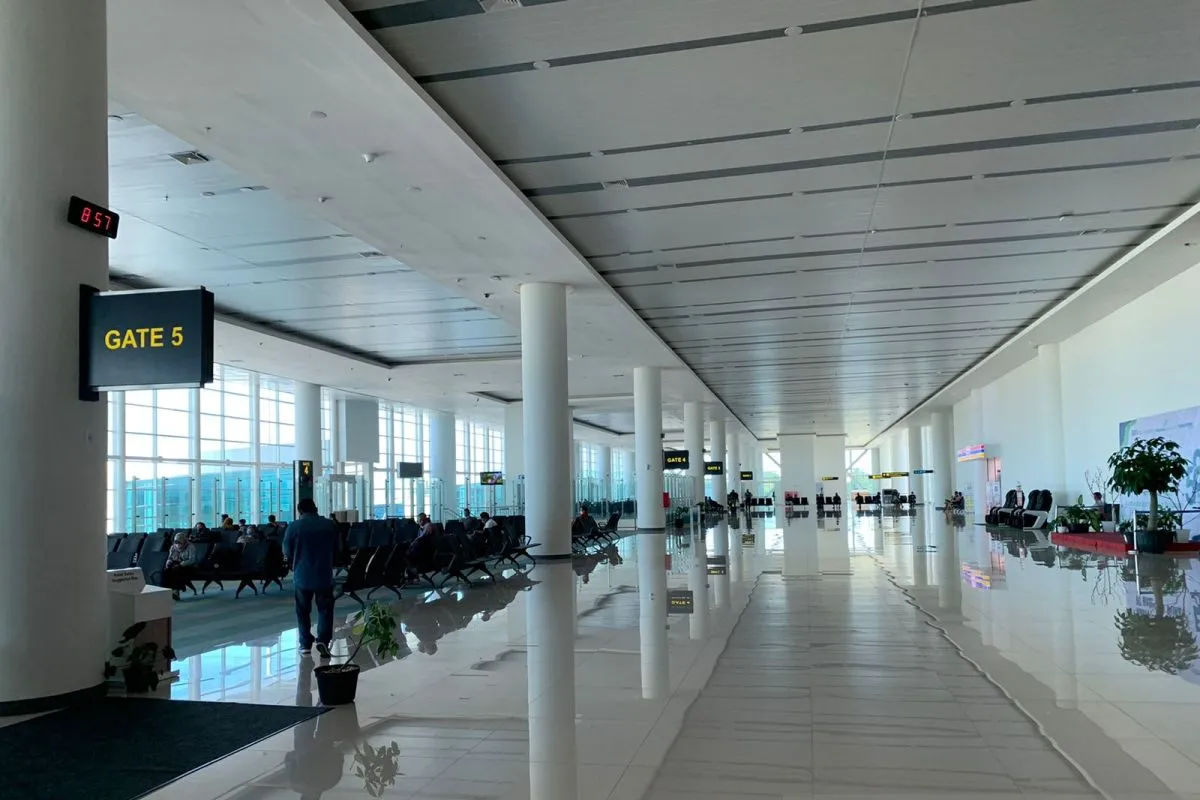
Boarding gate

The airport previously faced overcapacity issues, with the old terminal covering only 9,000 m² and capable of accommodating around 1.3 million passengers. However, in 2013, it handled approximately 3.8 million passengers. As a result, proposals to construct a new terminal to accommodate the growing number of passengers and increasing air traffic have been under consideration for some time. In August 2012, about 58 hectares of 102 hectares (57%) of the land needed for the expansion had been acquired. The development work was predicted to be completed in late 2014. However, the development was delayed due to land acquisition problems and didn't get underway until 2017.

To increase the airport's capacity and services, Angkasa Pura I built a new terminal at Syamsudin Noor Airport along with other supporting facilities to overcome the problem of lack of capacity with an investment value of Rp. 2.2 trillion (US$1.4 billion). This airport development project is also included in one of the National Strategic Projects (PSN). The airport development project consists of two phases. Phase I, which effectively started in 2018, includes the construction of a new passenger terminal building covering an area of 77,569 square meters which can accommodate 7 million passengers per year, equipped with 42 check-in counters, three jetbridges and four baggage conveyors. Phase 2, which officially began in 2017, involves expanding the apron to 129,812 square meters to accommodate parking for 14 narrow-body aircraft, as well as 20 aircraft in total, including 2 Boeing 747s, 2 Boeing 777s, 2 Boeing 767s, 12 Boeing 737s, and 2 ATR-72s. The phase also includes the construction of supporting facilities, such as a new cargo terminal covering 3,079 square meters, and a vehicle parking area of 36,780 square meters, which will accommodate 1,199 four-wheeled vehicles and 720 two-wheeled vehicles. After multiple delays, the new airport terminal officially began operations on 18 December 2019, following its inauguration by then-President Joko Widodo.

=== Future developments ===
To accommodate wide-body aircraft and growing air traffic, proposals have been made to extend the existing runway by 500 meters, increasing its length from 2,500 meters to 3,000 meters. This upgrade would enable the airport to accommodate wide-body aircraft such as the Boeing 777 and Airbus A380, thereby allowing it to operate direct Hajj flights to Saudi Arabia. An investment of 356 billion rupiah has been allocated for the runway extension. The airport terminal will ultimately be expanded to approximately 108,134 m², enabling it to accommodate up to 12 million passengers annually.

The area surrounding the airport is planned to be developed into an aerocity. Aero City Banjarbaru is intended to support a wide range of activities, including business, logistics, industrial, commercial, and service sectors. The development is guided by several key principles, namely airport-centric development, a mixed-use concept, integration with public transportation, and a Transit Oriented Development (TOD) approach. These principles aim to create a compact, efficient, and well-connected urban area. Sustainability is also a central consideration, with the government ensuring that development remains environmentally friendly through the provision of adequate green open spaces. In addition, the plan includes the development of affordable housing for the community, including low-income groups (MBR).

== Airlines and destinations ==
Airlines	Destinations
AirAsia	Kuala Lumpur–International
Batik Air	Jakarta–Soekarno-Hatta
Citilink	Balikpapan, Jakarta–Soekarno-Hatta, Semarang, Surabaya,
Garuda Indonesia	Jakarta–Soekarno-Hatta; Seasonal: Jeddah
Lion Air	Denpasar, Makassar, Semarang, Surabaya, Yogyakarta–International
Pelita Air	Jakarta–Soekarno-Hatta
Smart Aviation	Puruk Cahu
Super Air Jet	Jakarta–Soekarno-Hatta, Surabaya, Yogyakarta–International
Susi Air	Buntok, Kuala Kurun, Kuala Pembuang, Puruk Cahu, Tumbang Samba
Wings Air	Balikpapan, Batulicin, Kotabaru, Muara Teweh, Samarinda

== Statistics ==
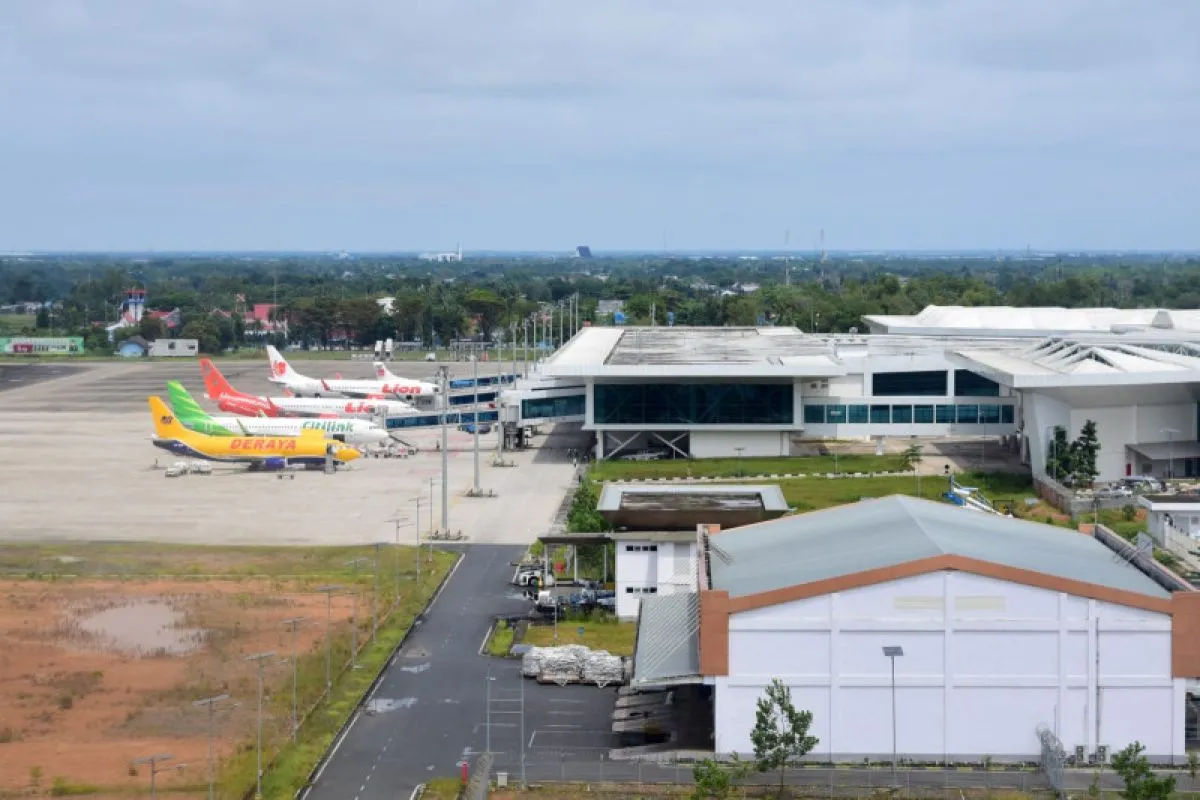
Aircraft lining up at Syamsudin Noor Airport

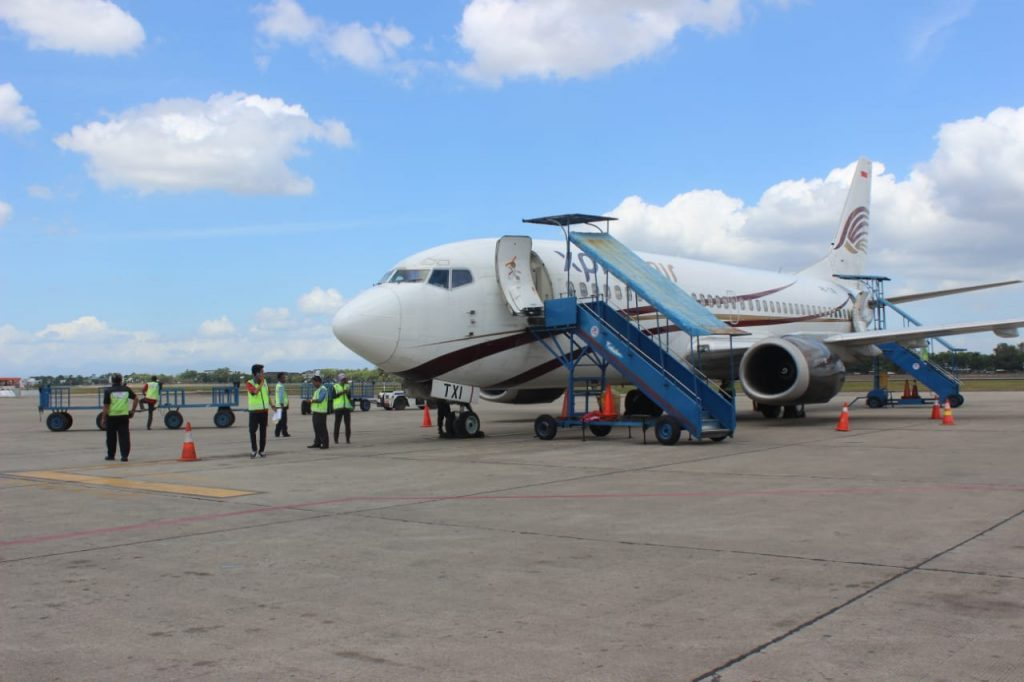
Xpress Air Boeing 737-300 at Syamsudin Noor Airport, 2019

Annual passenger numbers and aircraft statistics
Year	Passengers handled	Passenger % change	Cargo (tonnes)	Cargo % change	Aircraft movements	Aircraft % change
2006	1,488,879	Steady	10,919	Steady	15,189	Steady
2007	1,595,230	▲7.1	13,205	▲20.9	N/A	Steady
2008	1,808,154	▲13.3	16,046	▲21.5	15,476	Steady
2009	2,078,022	▲14.9	13,644	▼15.0	19,120	▲23.5
2010	2,619,867	▲26.1	17,050	▲25.0	22,349	▲16.9
2011	3,014,256	▲15.1	13,732	▼19.5	25,157	▲12.6
2012	3,851,622	▲27.8	10,140	▼26.2	30,835	▲22.6
2013	3,877,813	▲0.7	12,162	▲19.9	32,149	▲4.3
2014	3,900,623	▲0.6	20,785	▲70.9	30,702	▼4.5
2015	3,546,554	▼9.1	22,052	▲6.1	28,820	▼6.1
2016	3,602,954	▲1.6	23,235	▲5.4	29,729	▲3.2
2017	3,667,611	▲1.8	23,009	▼1.0	29,350	▼1.3
2018	3,928,075	▲7.1	25,591	▲11.2	31,895	▲8.7
2019	3,292,297	▼16.2	20,333	▼20.5	27,493	▼13.8
2020	1,489,866	▼54.7	22,089	▲8.6	17,432	▼36.6
2021	1,298,603	▼12.8	26,901	▲21.8	16,118	▼7.5
2022	2,371,245	▲82.6	27,261	▲1.3	21,288	▲32.1
2023	3,267,350	▲37.8	26,289	▼3.6	26,496	▲24.5
2024	3,132,529	▼4.1	33,045	▲25.7	26,741	▲0.9
^{Source: DGCA, BPS}

== Ground transportation ==
=== Taxi ===
Usually taxis are there until the last flight. Taxi service providers are:

- Arya Taxi
- Kojatas Taxi
- Kopatas Taxi
- Banua Taxi
- Banjar Taxi
- Borneo Taxi
- City Transportation with the aim: Banjarmasin KM 6, Gambut, Banjarbaru, and Martapura

=== Bus ===
Perum DAMRI operates bus routes from the Airport to Banjarmasin by medium-sized buses.

== Accidents and incidents ==
- On 13 January 1980, a McDonnell Douglas DC-9 PK-GND of Garuda Indonesia named "Brantas", was damaged beyond repair in a heavy landing. There were no injuries.
- On 4 January 1989, a Bouraq Indonesia Airlines PK-IHA HS 748 suffered extensive damage when the pilots had to perform a belly landing at Syamsudin Noor Airport, following a failure of the landing gears with 47 passengers and five crew on board.
- On 28 August 1992, Vickers Viscount PK-IVX of Bouraq Indonesia Airlines was damaged beyond economic repair when an engine fire forced the crew to abort the take-off.
- On 16 August 2013, Garuda Indonesia Boeing 737-8U3 PK-GMH flight 532 from Jakarta suffered from nose wheel steering malfunction. The aircraft landed safely but needed to be towed off the runway.
- On 16 April 2016, ATR 72-500 PK-KSC of Kalstar Aviation flight KD931 was climbing from Banjarmasin to Kotabaru when the crew reported a fire indication in the number 1 engine. The plane returned and landed at Banjarmasin about 15 minutes later. The aircraft stopped on the runway and was evacuated. There were no injuries. Indonesia's Ministry of Transportation confirmed the aircraft suffered an engine fire indication; the engine was shut down.
