= State University of Makassar =

Public university in Indonesia

- Universitas Negeri Makassar
- Motto: Tetap Jaya dalam Tantangan (Stay glorious amid challenges)
- Type: Public university
- Established: 1 August 1961
- Affiliations: ASAIHL, AUAP, OAF
- Rector: Prof. Dr. H. Karta Jayadi, M.Sn.
- Administrative staff: 1.300
- Students: 54,000
- Location: Makassar, South Sulawesi, Indonesia
- Campus: Urban
- Colors: Orange
- Nickname: UNM
- Website: www.unm.ac.id

State University of Makassar (Indonesian: Universitas Negeri Makassar) is a public university in Makassar, South Sulawesi, Indonesia. It was established on 1 August 1961. Its rector is Prof. Dr. H. Karta Jayadi,. M.Sn.

== History ==
Founded on August 1, 1961, until August 31, 1964, the status of Teacher Training and Education Faculty of Hasanuddin University, based on Ministerial Decree No. PTIP. 30, 1964 Date of August 1, 1961. on 1 September 1964 until January 1965 the status of Yogyakarta branch Makassar Teachers' Training College, based on Ministerial Decree No. PTIP. 154 of 1965 Date 1 September 1965. as well as at 5 January to August 3, 1999, with the name of the independent status of Makassar Teachers' Training College, by decree of the President of the Republic Indonesia No.272 of 1965 dated January 5, 1965. In this phase, since 1 April 1972, Teachers 'Training College Teachers' Training College Makassar changed to Ujung Pandang by following a name change Makassar Municipal Municipal Ujung Pandang. and on August 4, 1999, to the present status of university by the name of Makassar State University (UNM) based on the Decree of President of the Republic Indonesia No. 93 of 1999 dated August 4, 1999. Until mid-2011, the number of D3 9 Prodi Prodi as much as 58 S1, S2 Prodi Prodi as many as 12 and as many as 5 S3.

== Chancellor ==
- Prof. Arnold Mononoetoe (1961)
- Prof. Idrak Yasin. MA (1965)
- Mayjen A.A Rivai (1965)
- Prof. Edy Agussalim Mokodompit. MA (1965 - 1974)
- Drs Abdul Karim (1974 -1982)
- Prof. Dr. Paturungi Parawansa (1982 - 1990)
- Prof. Dr. Syahruddin Kaseng (1990 - 1999)
- Prof. Dr. M. Idris Arief. MS (1999 - 2007)
- Prof. Dr. Arismunandar. M.Pd (2008–2016)
- Prof. Dr. H. Husain Syam, M.TP. (2016–2024)
- Prof. Dr. H. Karta Jayadi, M.Sn. (2024-present)

== Faculty ==
The University has 11 faculties:

- Faculty of Social Sciences and Law
- Faculty of Languages and Literature
- Faculty of Art and Design
- Faculty of Sport Science
- Faculty of Psychology
- Faculty of Economics and Business
- Faculty of Mathematic and Natural Sciences
- Faculty of Engineering
- Faculty of Education Science
- Faculty of Medicine
- Postgraduate Program
