= Batulicin =

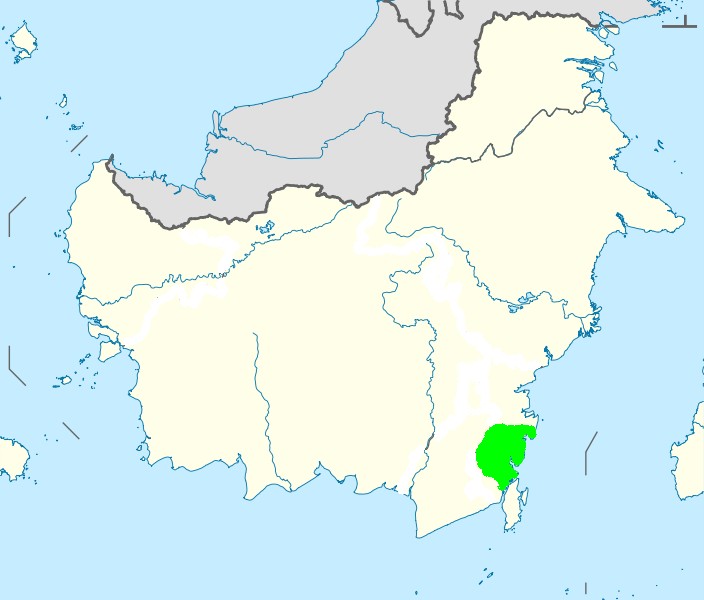
Tanah Bumbu regency in South Kalimantan (Borneo)

Batu Licin, also written as Batulicin (abbreviated: BLN), is a district of Tanah Bumbu regency and its capital, in South Kalimantan, Indonesia. Batulicin is situated on the banks of the Batulicin River and is 265 km east of the city of Banjarmasin, capital of the province in South Kalimantan.

Batulicin is an important center for coal shipping from South Kalimantan to various parts of Indonesia as well as other countries. Batulicin is located at the edge of a strait that connects the Java Sea to the Straits of Makassar. Batulicin is served by Batu Licin Airport. Batulicin is currently developed to be an industrial park.
