= Bantaeng Regency =

Regency in South Sulawesi, Indonesia

Coordinates: 5°32′S 119°56′E

Bantaeng Regency Kabupaten Bantaeng
- Regency

Regional transcription(s)
  - Makassar: ᨀᨅᨘᨄᨈᨙ ᨅᨈᨕᨙᨂ
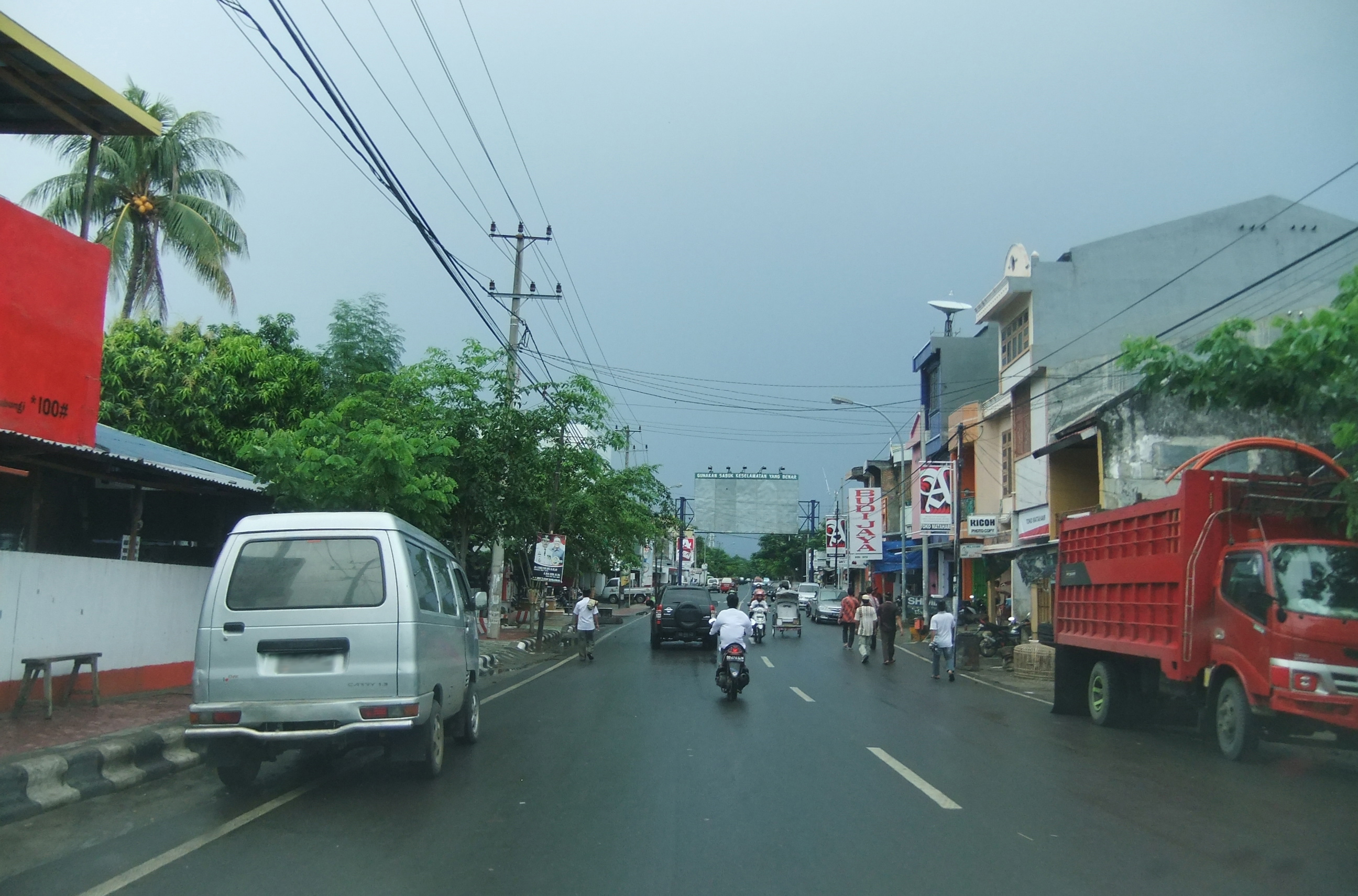
- Town of Bantaeng

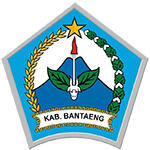
- Seal

- Location within South Sulawesi
- Country: Indonesia
- Province: South Sulawesi
- Capital: Bantaeng

Government
  - Regent: Fathul Fauzy Nurdin
  - Vice Regent: Sahabuddin

Area
  - Total: 390.97 km^{2} (150.95 sq mi)

Population (mid 2025 estimate)
  - Total: 221,359
  - Density: 566.18/km^{2} (1,466.4/sq mi)
- Time zone: UTC+8 (WITA)
- Website: http://www.bantaeng.go.id

Bantaeng Regency (Kabupaten Bantaeng; ᨀᨅᨘᨄᨈᨙ ᨅᨈᨕᨙᨂ) is a regency of South Sulawesi Province in Indonesia. It covers an area of 390.97 km^{2} and had a population of 176,984 at the 2010 Census, rising to 196,716 at the 2020 Census. The official estimate as at mid 2025 was 221,359 (comprising 109,626 males and 111,723 females). The administrative centre is the town of Bantaeng (historically, Bonthain), which lies on the south coast of the southern peninsula of Sulawesi island.

== Administration ==
Bantaeng Regency is divided into eight Districts (Kecamatan), tabulated below with their areas and their populations at the 2010 Census and the 2020 Census, as well as according to the official estimates for mid 2025. The table also includes the locations of the district administrative centres, the numbers of villages in each district (totaling 46 rural desa and 21 urban kelurahan), and its post codes.

Kode Wilayah	Name of District (kecamatan)	Area in km^{2}	Pop'n Census 2010	Pop'n Census 2020	Pop'n Estimate mid 2025	Admin centre	No. of villages	Post code
73.03.01	Bissappu	32.84	30,931	35,356	38,935	Banto Lebang	11 ^{(a)}	92451
73.03.06	Uluere	63.55	10,814	11,563	13,501	Banto Marannu	6	92452
73.03.08	Sinoa	43.00	11,827	13,031	14,837	Banto Maccini	6	92450
73.03.02	Bantaeng (town)	28.87	36,718	39,597	42,479	Pallantikang	9 ^{(b)}	92411 -92415
73.03.03	Eremerasa	45.01	18,614	21,284	24,203	Ulugalung	9	92414 -92415
73.03.04	Tompobulu	75.85	22,913	24,857	27,165	Banyorang	10 ^{(c)}	92462
73.03.05	Pa'jukukang	48.90	29,017	32,331	39,367	Nipa-nipa	10	92460
73.03.07	Gantarangkeke	52.95	15,865	18,697	20,872	Gantarangteke	6 ^{(d)}	92461
	Totals	390.97	176,699	196,716	221,359	Bantaeng	67	

Notes: (a) comprises 7 kelurahan (Bonto Atu, Bonto Jaya, Bonto Langkasa, Bonto Lebang, Bonto Manai, Bonto Rita and Bonto Sunggu) and 4 desa.
(b) comprises 8 kelurahan (Karatuang, Lamalaka, Lembang, Letta, Mallilingi, Onto, Pallantikang and Tappanjeng) and 1 desa.
(c) comprises 4 kelurahan (Banyorang, Campaga, Ereng-Ereng and Lembang Gantarangkeke) and 6 desa.
(d) comprises 2 kelurahan (Gantarangkeke and Tanah Loe) and 4 desa.

== Climate ==
Bantaeng has a tropical savanna climate (Aw) with moderate to little rainfall from July to November and heavy rainfall from December to June.

Climate data for Bantaeng
Month	Jan	Feb	Mar	Apr	May	Jun	Jul	Aug	Sep	Oct	Nov	Dec	Year
Mean daily maximum °C (°F)	29.8 (85.6)	29.8 (85.6)	30.3 (86.5)	31.0 (87.8)	31.2 (88.2)	30.9 (87.6)	31.0 (87.8)	31.6 (88.9)	32.0 (89.6)	32.2 (90.0)	31.3 (88.3)	30.1 (86.2)	30.9 (87.7)
Daily mean °C (°F)	26.3 (79.3)	26.3 (79.3)	26.5 (79.7)	26.8 (80.2)	26.9 (80.4)	26.3 (79.3)	25.8 (78.4)	26.0 (78.8)	26.4 (79.5)	27.0 (80.6)	27.0 (80.6)	26.5 (79.7)	26.5 (79.7)
Mean daily minimum °C (°F)	22.8 (73.0)	22.9 (73.2)	22.8 (73.0)	22.7 (72.9)	22.6 (72.7)	21.7 (71.1)	20.7 (69.3)	20.4 (68.7)	20.9 (69.6)	21.8 (71.2)	22.8 (73.0)	22.9 (73.2)	22.1 (71.7)
Average rainfall mm (inches)	181 (7.1)	149 (5.9)	128 (5.0)	130 (5.1)	194 (7.6)	185 (7.3)	106 (4.2)	41 (1.6)	20 (0.8)	46 (1.8)	80 (3.1)	144 (5.7)	1,404 (55.2)
Source: Climate-Data.org

== Tourism ==
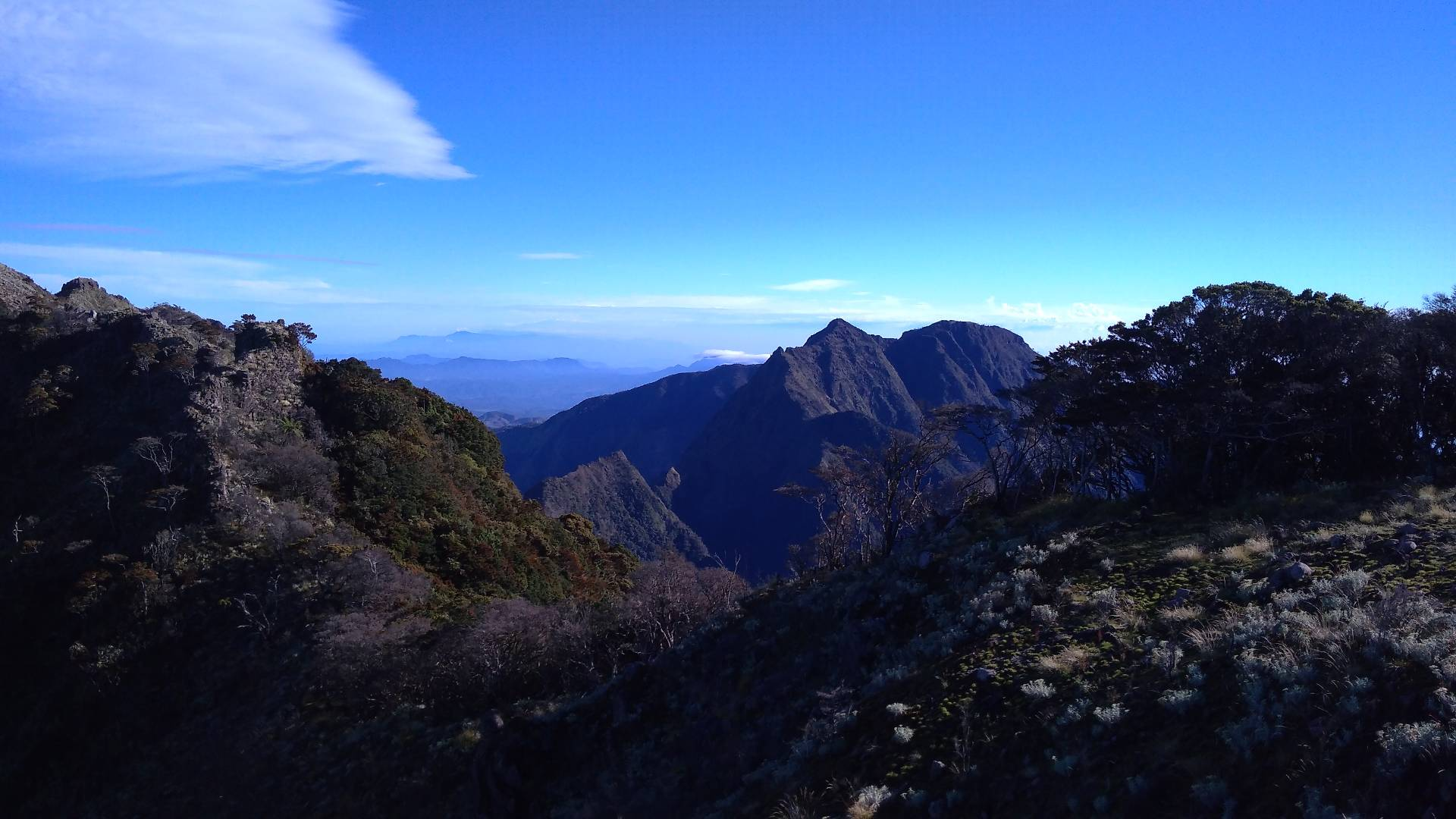
Mount Lompobattang

Bantaeng Regency has 3 beaches:

- Lamalaka Beach
- Seruni Beach
- Marina Beach and Resort

The previous 2 beaches is near the administrative centre, Bantaeng, and the last beach is 18 kilometers southeast of Lamalaka Beach.
