= Pagaruyung II inscription =

14th century Sumatran inscribed text

- Bukit Gombak II inscription
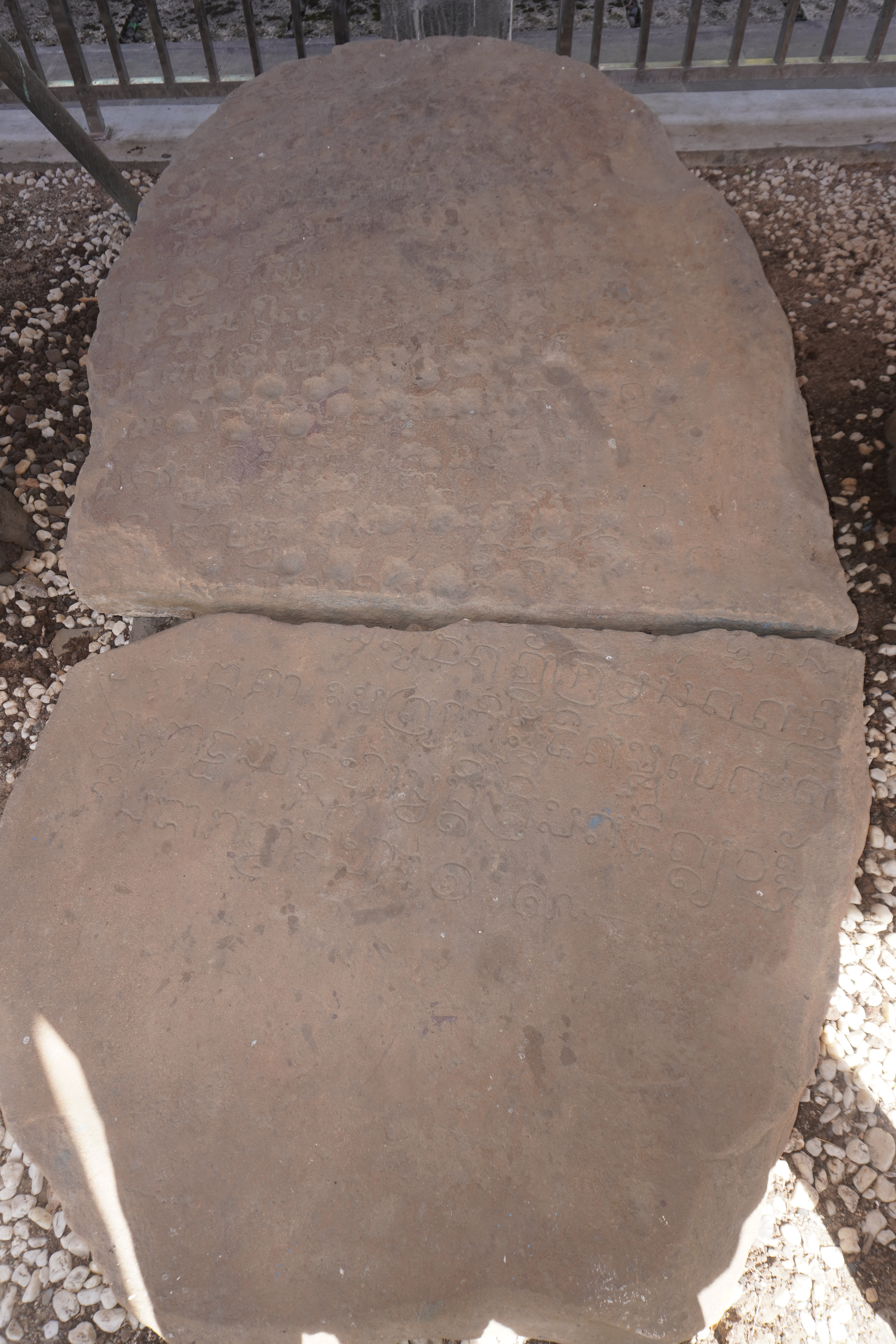
- Pagaruyung II inscription, split in two, overhead view
- Type: Stone inscription
- Material: Yellowish-brown sandstone
- Size: Rectangular shape, measuring height = 250 cm, width = 116 cm, thickness = 18 cm
- Writing: Post-Pallava script
- Created: 1295 Śaka (1373 CE)
- Place: Bukit Gombak, Lima Kaum District, Tanah Datar Regency, West Sumatra
- Present location: Adityawarman Inscription Complex
- Coordinates: 0.4597310°S 100.60784°E
- Language: Sanskrit and Old Malay

Location
- Pagaruyung II inscription (Sumatra) Location of inscription

Pagaruyung II inscription is a stone inscription attributed to King Adityawarman, dated 1295 Śaka or 1373 CE. It is also known as the Bukit Gombak II inscription. The text is written in both Sanskrit and Old Malay, using the Pallava script. The carving is fine and neatly executed, with strokes cut deeply into the stone. The inscription has suffered damage over time, leaving much of the text difficult to read.

This inscription was first recorded in the Bukit Gombak area. It has since been relocated to the Adityawarman Inscription Complex, in Gudam, Pagaruyung Village, Tanjung Emas District, Tanah Datar Regency, West Sumatra. The complex lies along the highway connecting Pagaruyung and Batusangkar. In addition to this inscription, the site also contains several others, numbered Pagaruyung I through Pagaruyung VIII.

The contents of this inscription are expressions of respect and worship for Adityawarman as a respected ruler. This inscription was officially designated as a National Cultural Heritage Object through Decree (SK) Number PM.05/PW.007/MKP/2010, issued by the Ministry of Culture and Tourism of Indonesia on January 8, 2010.

== Background ==
This inscription has been mentioned in the official report of the Dutch colonial government, Inventaris der Oudheden in de Padangsche Bovenlanden (1912), compiled by N.J. Krom based on field data from the Assistant Resident Louis Constant Westenenk in Fort de Kock (now Bukittinggi City). In his report, Krom grouped the stone inscriptions in the Minangkabau highlands area into two categories: Adityawarman-inscripties, namely inscriptions that directly mention the name of King Adityawarman, and inscriptions that use a similar script form but do not mention the name of the king, which he called Adityawarman-schrift. This inscription belongs to the first group and is listed in inventory number 24, page 42, with the description: "A large, flat, cracked stone, on top of which is the beginning of + ten lines; at the end of which is the name Adityawarman. This stone is now in Pagaruyung (= Pagaruyung stone No. 2)".

Krom noted that this inscription was found in the Bukit Gombak area, which during the colonial period was part of the Onderafdeeling Fort van der Capellen. The original location of the discovery was in Bukit Gombak, Baringin Village, Lima Kaum District, Tanah Datar Regency, West Sumatra. In the following period, this inscription was moved from its original location and is now stored in the Adityawarman Inscription Complex.

In general, the inscriptions praise King Adityawarman. He is thought to have produced at least twenty inscriptions, eighteen of which are located in Tanah Datar Regency. According to some historians, Adityawarman maintained ties with kingdoms on Java; thus, many of the carvings on his inscriptions are thought to have been inspired by the traditions of Javanese kings.

== Physical description ==
The Pagaruyung II inscription measures 250 centimeters high, 116 centimeters wide, and 18 centimeters thick, and is written on yellowish-brown sandstone quartz. This inscription has been broken into two parts, and it is placed lying next to the Pagaruyung I inscription. Due to this condition, this inscription does not produce complete sentences and translations. The physical condition of this inscription is not good so it is difficult to read, but it is estimated that there are 14 lines of writing on the stone. On the upper stone, there are 9 lines of writing where many words are missing. However, the condition of the lower stone is relatively better so that it can still be read with more complete sentences. This inscription has deep scratches and the writing can be said to be beautiful and neat.

On the upper stone, damage or wear was found to the inscription on the left side, although only a few letters. The damage on the right side and the middle end of the inscription was more severe. The damage on the right side was due to stone wear, while in the middle end of the inscription, it was due to artificial holes, which disrupted and removed some of the inscription. Furthermore, several lines of writing were missing, particularly on the lower left side, due to loose or missing pieces of stone. This is evident from the downward-sloping shape of the fragment on the right side, resulting in several letters appearing on this side, as a continuation of the missing letters on the left side.

On the lower stone, which is a fragment of the upper stone, the joints were not completely connected. This indicates that some parts of the writing were missing. As a result, the writing on the last line of the upper stone does not continue with the initial writing on the lower stone. However, the lower stone has intact and relatively good inscriptions, except for the broken initial section.

=== Ornaments ===
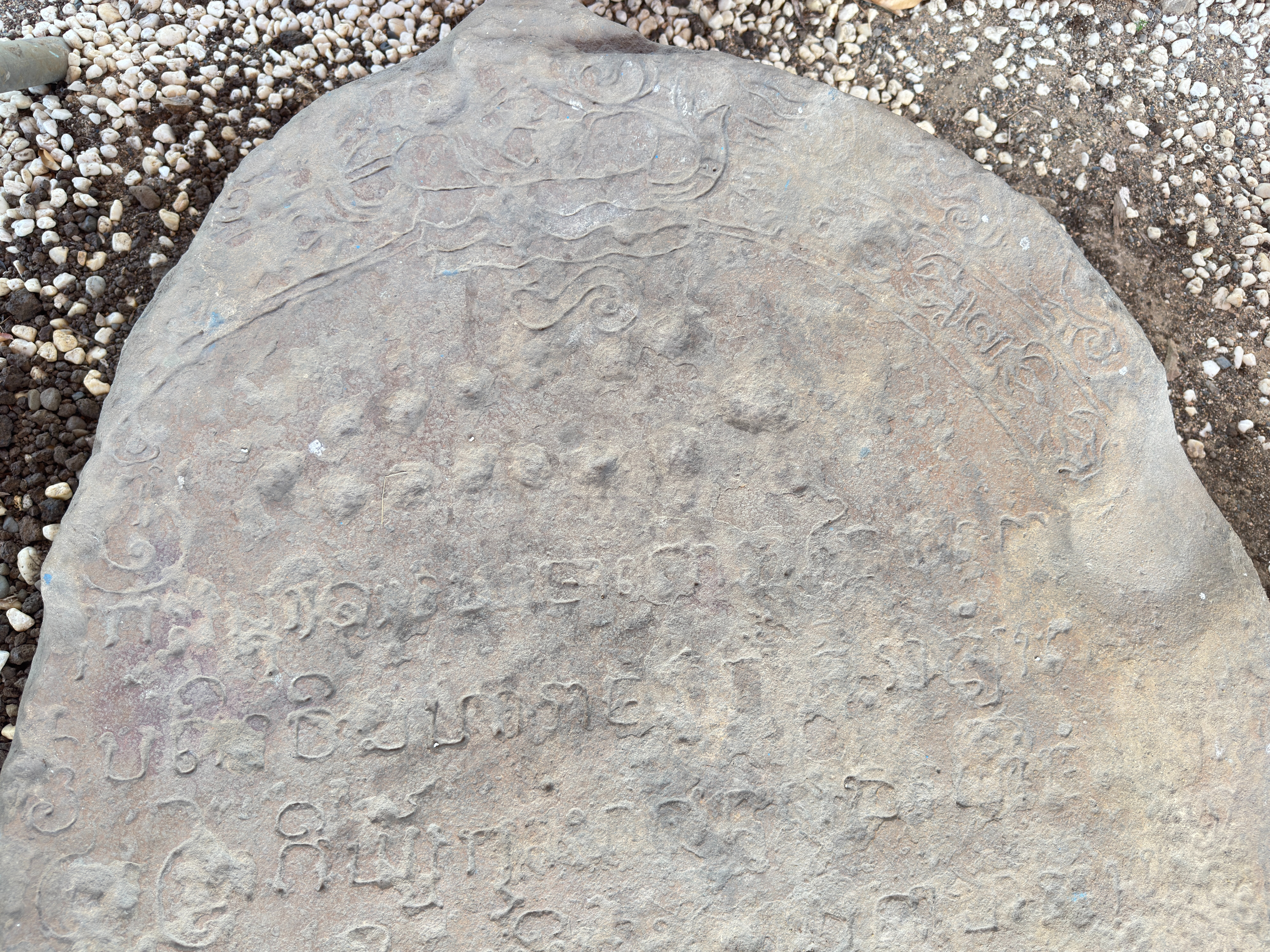
Intricate ornamentation found at the top of the Pagaruyung II inscription

The ornamentation on the Pagaruyung II inscription appears richer than that of the Pagaruyung I inscription. The ornamentation depicts a shape resembling a stylized head of a bhoota kala (ghost), with a frame decorated with tendril motifs and intricate geometric patterns.

The kala head at the top of this inscription has thick lips or a mustache with a long, protruding tongue. From the right and left sides of the head tendrils or horns emerge that resemble a forked snake's tongue, and there are also other ornaments that form a dense frame with decorations inside. The upper part of the kala head is pointed, so that when combined with its frame it forms a stela.

The use of pictorial ornaments on Adityawarman's inscriptions in West Sumatra is something new, because Malay kings had never previously carved on their inscriptions.

== Contents ==
Basically, the Pagaruyung II inscription expresses respect and adoration for the greatness and majesty of Adityawarman as a powerful and respected king.

On the second line of the inscription, the words nrpati and maharaja appear, typically used to denote a person's name and title. However, many of the letters before and after these words have worn away and are now illegible. On the seventh line, the word "Śaka" is found, indicating the date. On the eighth line, the year is numbered using a chronogram. According to Istiawan (2006), yakse ("giant") means 5 and dwara ("gate") means 9, resulting in the year --95 Śaka. Assuming this inscription is contemporary with Adityawarman's other inscriptions, a possible date is 1295 Śaka or 1373 CE. Thus, this inscription is estimated to have been issued two or three years before Adityawarman's abdication, as suggested by the Saruaso I inscription—the latest dated inscription—which is dated 1375 CE.

A fragment at the end of the inscription, reading sadaganyjanam, means 'man from the mountain'. However, because the physical form of the stone is no longer intact, the full contents of the inscription remain incompletely understood, as the surviving text yields a fragmented translation.

== Transliteration and translation ==
This inscription was written using the Post-Palawa script using Sanskrit and Old Malay.

=== Transliteration ===
The following are the transliterations of the Pagaruyung II inscription, according to Utomo (2007) and Kusumadewi (2012):

Utomo (2007)

1. Subhamastu //0//---jāto bha-ṅa
2. nṛpati ravi mahārāja---rajyami---
3. -giryya śūnani mātanuśatharaṇI [m]aṃ[da] ---
4. kādhī mūlastriteshi si---tatmārasa---
5. nani. satalani ri pakaga --- maśa - lan ---
6. -la sa sāt ---------- raśa ra kr---
7. sabha svasti rātu na rajña //0// sakaga
8. ------- i ---- pakșe da ---- teșṭina, dha ---
9. -------------
10. ------------- ddhanasa -
11. ----------- sanya caturtthi grașṭa satatana
12. pu dū saṅgatā . matriyā girmuditammupekșa ka---
13. tva toddhampadam . svasti
14. - ri sadā ganjānam //0//

Kusumadewi (2012)

2. nr□pati ravi mahārāja___rajyami___
3. _giryyam gunam mātanuśatharan□i(m)an(da)___
4. kādī mūlastriteshi si___tatmārasa
5. nani satalani ri pakaga__maśa_lan__
6. la sa sāt____raśa ra kr□___
7. sabha svasti rātu na rajna//0// sakaga
8. ___i___paks□e da___tes□□na dha___
9. _____
10. ______ddhanasa
11. ____sanya caturtthi gras□t□a satatana
12. pu dū sangatā matriyā girmuditammupeks□aka___
13. tvah tad dhama paam/ svasti sŕimat ādittavarmma_
14. nari sadā ganyjānam //0//

== Translation ==
The following are the translations of the Pagaruyung II inscription, according to according to Istiawan (2006) and Arlo Griffiths, as quoted in Kusumadewi (2012):

Istiawan (2006)

1. Prosperity (happiness) ... (the rest has not yet been translated)
2-6. Not yet translated
7. ...may the king be happy //o// (in the) Śaka (year)...
8. (chronogram) yakse (giant) dwara (gate)
9. ~~~~~~~~~~~~~~~~~~~ (broken stone)
10. on the 20th day (?)
11. (in the) quiet on the 4th day, family (catur asrama?) kinship?
12. ...friendly, joyful, and courageous
13. .../May King Adityawarman be happy
14. because of sadaganyjanam

Griffiths, in Kusumadewi (2012)
1. The king of kings, the great ruler who became like the sun among kings, born from the lineage of Indra, and originating from the land of gold, when the roots of the Bodhi (tree) were established upon the earth and mount Bajendra..... slew all enemies..... affecting prosperity until Buddha the (future) king.
2. When this was returned in the Śaka year (1) month, (2) wing, (9) hole... (129X) on the 8th day of the month of Kārtika, day.....
3. .....always eliminating the four..... going far, with hospitality, joy, hope, feeling..... Buddha state. The prosperity and majesty of King Adityawarman, who always eradicates his enemies..

== Significance and preservation ==
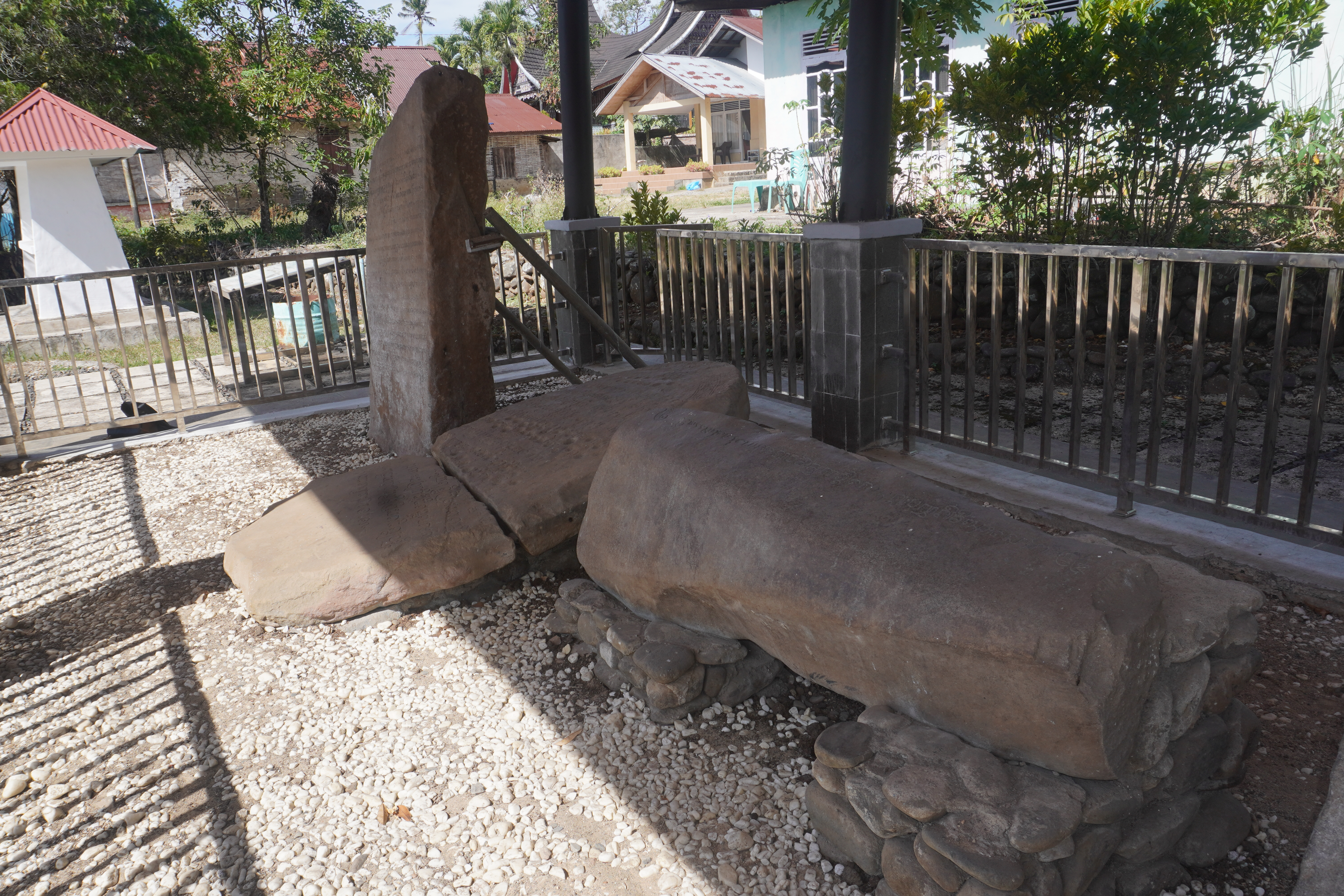
Positioned horizontally in the center, the Pagaruyung II inscription is situated between Pagaruyung I (far left) and Pagaruyung III (far right) within the complex fence.

The Pagaruyung II inscription still functions today as a medium of education and historical introduction for both the local community and the wider public. Although parts of the inscription have been damaged, its presence—together with other inscriptions in the Adityawarman Inscription Complex—remains an important source for tracing the legacy of Old Malay civilization and the golden age of the Adityawarman Kingdom. The writings carved into these stones serve not only as governmental records, but also as historical witnesses that reflect the cultural, religious, and linguistic achievements of the period.

The management and maintenance of this inscription fall under the supervision of the Cultural Heritage Preservation Office Region III (formerly the Cultural Heritage Preservation Office of West Sumatra). As a protected archaeological site, the inscription complex continues to attract researchers, historians, and serves as an educational tourism destination for understanding the cultural history of West Sumatra. Technical conservation efforts carried out by the office include the construction of a shelter roof to protect against weather, as well as the installation of an iron fence around the complex to prevent damage, including from wild animals. In 2022, improvements were made to several Adityawarman inscription sites around Batusangkar City, focusing on infrastructure upgrades to enhance accessibility for researchers and visitors.

This inscription has also been officially recognized as a National Cultural Heritage Object through Decree (SK) Number PM.05/PW.007/MKP/2010, issued by the Ministry of Culture and Tourism of Indonesia on January 8, 2010.

== See also ==
- Fort van der Capellen
- Sanskrit inscriptions in Maritime Southeast Asia
