= Ir. Soekarno Bridge =

Indonesian bridge that crosses the Seruyan River

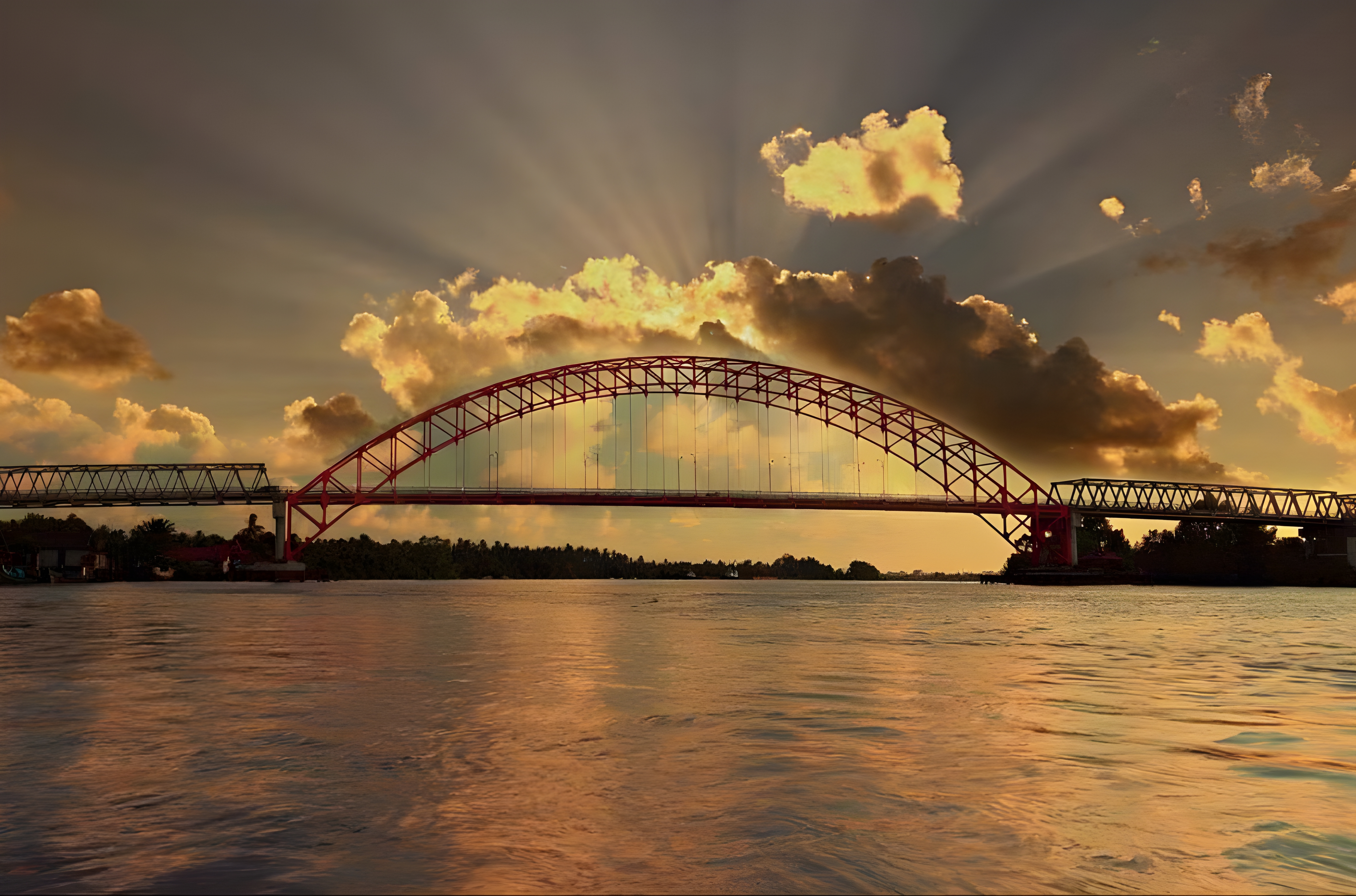
The bridge, as seen in 2018

The Seruyan Bridge is a bridge that crosses the Seruyan River, connecting Kuala Pembuang and Persil Raya to Pematang Panjang. The bridge is located in Seruyan Regency, Indonesia. The bridge, which is 590 meters long and 9 meters wide, connects Pematang Panjang village with the city of Kuala Pembuang, which is the capital of Seruyan Regency.

== Construction ==
Construction of the Seruyan Bridge began in 2009 by the first Regent, Darwan Ali, and was completed in the same year. Previously, the Seruyan Bridge was planned to be inaugurated on August 5, 2010. However, because at that time several parts of the Seruyan Bridge were still under construction, such as the sidewalks, safety fences and bridge lighting had not been completed, the inauguration and operation of the bridge had to be postponed until October 2010.

== Naming ==
Officially, the bridge does not yet have a name, and it is proposed that the bridge be named the Soekarno Bridge, which is taken from the Dutch spelling of Sukarno, the first president of Indonesia. In 2019, an Ir. Soekarno nameplate was installed at the entrance to the bridge, making the bridge officially named the Ir Soekarno Bridge.

== See also ==
- List of bridges in Indonesia
