= Pemboewan =

Onderdistrict of Dutch East Indies

Pemboewan Onderdistrict Pemboewan
- Onderdistrict of Dutch East Indies
- 1787–1946
- Dutch East indies Company's Flag in Pembuang

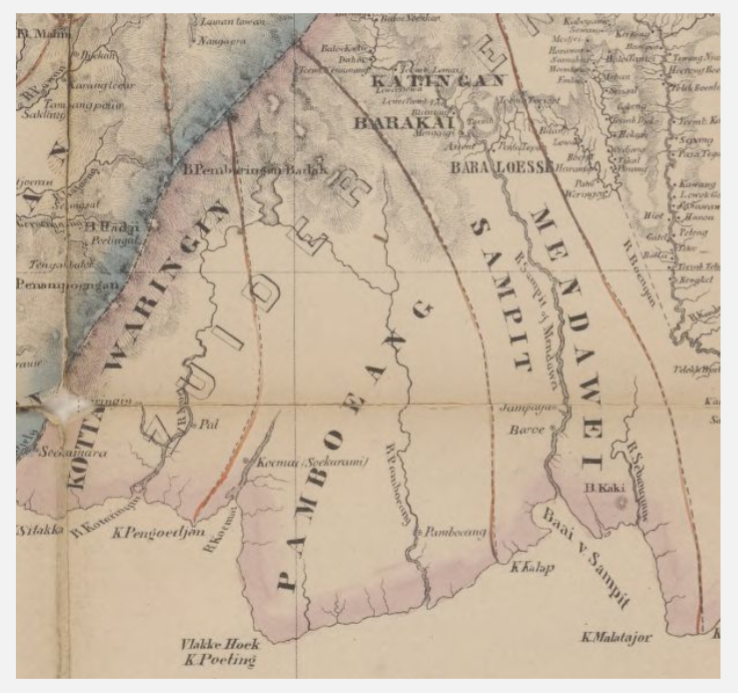
- Pemboewan district in 1861
- Capital: Sampit (1797–1898); Telaga Pulang (1898–1902); Pembuang Hulu (1902–1905); Kuala Pembuang (1905)
- Government
  - Type: Inlands Bestuur
- Onderdistrictshoofd (Asisten Kjai)
  - 1834: Kjai Ngabei Djaja-negara
  - 1847: Djoeragan Brahim (Ibrahim)
  - 1850: Raden Moeda (Radja Moeda)
  - 1859: Djaja Ngagara
  - 1870: Djoeragan Moehammad Seman
  - 1906: Kiai Achmad
- History
  - Established: 1787
  - Disestablished: 1946
Preceded by	Succeeded by
Banjar Sultanate	Great Dayak
- Today part of: Indonesia

Pemboewan or Pemboeang (Banjar: pambuang walanda) was a subdistrict (Dutch: onderdistrict) of the Dutch East Indies, located in modern-day Central Kalimantan, Indonesia.

Pemboewan is believed to have been the forerunner of the current Seruyan Regency. This district was established not long after Sunan Nata Alam handed over Pembuang Banjar to the Dutch VOC.

== History ==
=== Early history ===
The Pemboewan area was originally the territory of the Banjar Sultanate. At that time, a lot of area expansion was carried out by the Banjar Sultanate which made the Sultanate's territory very wide. At that time, this area was called Pambuang.

According to the Radermacher report, in 1780 the head of the Pembuang area (now Seruyan Regency) was Raden Jaya.

Since 13 August 1787, the Pembuang area (Seruyan Regency) was handed over by Sunan Nata Alam to the Dutch VOC. Even so, the first known regional head was Kjai Ngabei Djaja-Negara who ruled from 1834.

=== Under Onderdistrict government ===
Before 1880, the Seruyan area consisted of 13 villages where government officials were called "Assistant Kjai" who ruled directly from Sampit. The villages were Beratih (now Kuala Pembuang), Telaga Pulang, Sembuluh, Pembuang Hulu, Asam, Durian Kait, Sandul, Sukamandang, Rantau Pulut, Tumbang Kale, Tumbang Manjul, Sepundu Hantu, Tumbang Darap. In 1880. With the rapid development and growth of villages, an onderdistrict was formed with the capital city at Telaga Pulang.

In 1902, the capital moved from Telaga Pulang to Pembuang Hulu but did not last long and in 1905, the capital in Pembuang Hulu was moved to Kuala Pembuang, because of its location on the south coast, so it was considered strategic, especially for government, transportation and economic activities at that time.

=== Disestablishment ===
In 1940, the Japanese Empire expanded its territory to the South, namely to the Southeast Asia region, getting into conflict with the Dutch East Indies. The Dutch East Indies fell to the Japanese. Japan took control of the Pemboewan in early 1941.

In 1946, the kecamatan of Seruyan was formed out of the onderdistrict of Pemboeang, with Kuala Pembuang as its capital. Seruyan then joined the Great Dayak region under the leadership of J. van Dyk, ending the Pemboeang era.

== De facto ==
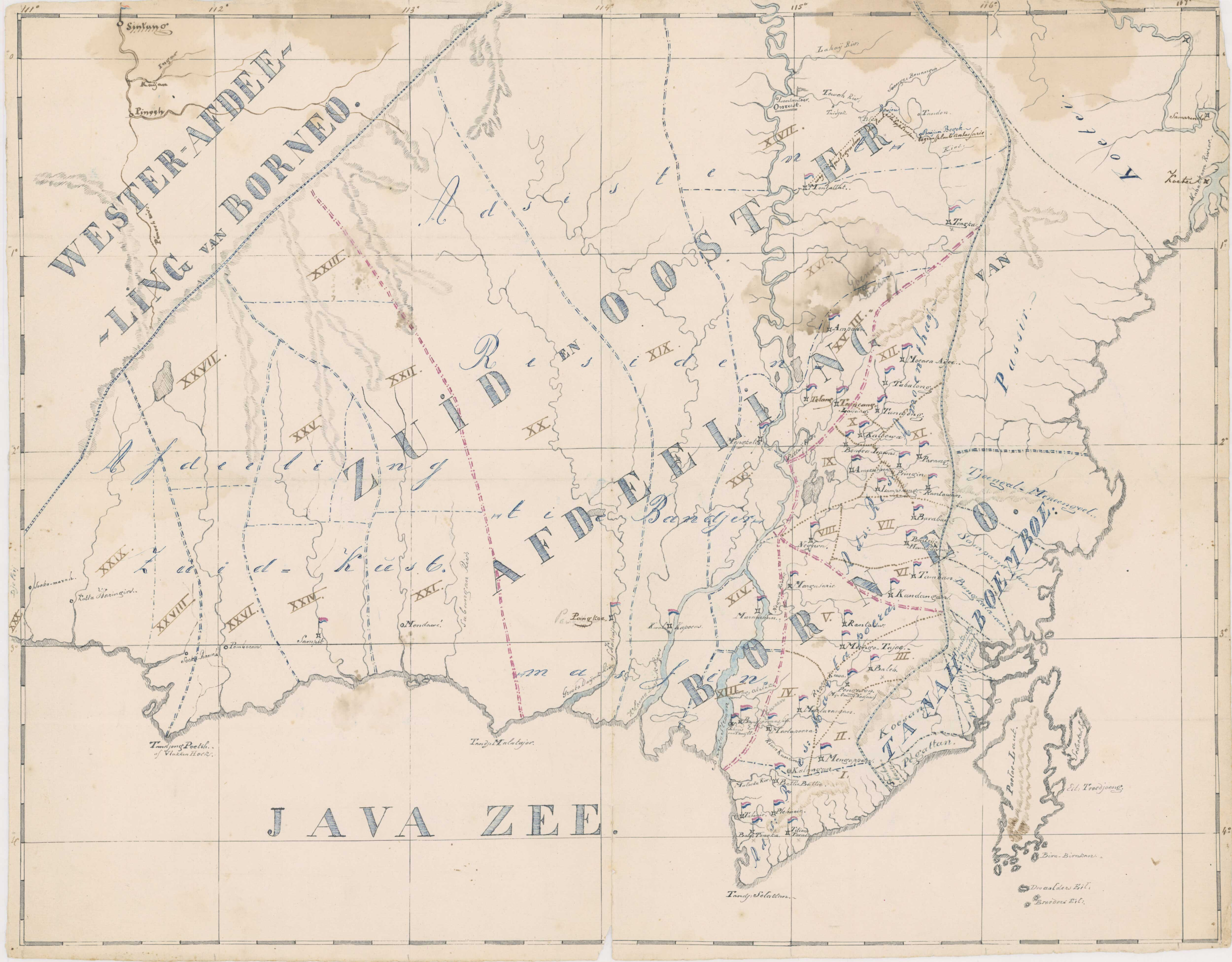
Zuid ooster-afdeeling van borneo map, Pemboewan area marked with no. XXVI

According to the Staatsblad van Nederlandsch Indië of 1849, this region is included in the Zuid-ooster-afdeeling based on Besluit van den Minister van Staat, Gouverneur-Generaal van Nederlandsch-Indië. On 27 August 1849, No. 8. In 1855, this area was part of the Zuider-afdeeling van Borneo.

== List of regional heads ==
Number	Name	Start reigning	End of reign	Title
1	Kjai ngabei Djaja-Negara	1834	1847	Asisten Kjai Hoofd van Pemboewan
2	Djoeragan Brahim	1847	1850	Hoofd van Pemboewan, Sampit en Semboeloe
3	Raden Moeda	1850	1859	Hoofd van Pemboewan alleen Radja Moeda
4	Djaja-Negara	1859	1870	Hoofd van Pemboewan en Semboeloe
5	Djoeragan Moehammad Seman	1870	1906	Districtshoofd van Pemboeang
6	Kiai Achmad	1906	1945	Asisten Kjai Hoofd van Pemboewan
