= Seruyan Kuala Pembuang Airport =

Airport in Central Kalimantan, Indonesia

Seruyan Kuala Pembuang Airport Bandara Seruyan Kuala Pembuang
- IATA: KLP; ICAO: WAGF

Summary
- Airport type: Public
- Owner: Directorate General of Civil Aviation
- Operator: Government
- Serves: Kuala Pembuang, Seruyan Regency, Central Kalimantan, Indonesia
- Elevation AMSL: 4 m / 13 ft
- Coordinates: 03°22′35″S 112°32′13″E

Map
- Location of airport in Kalimantan Location in Borneo

Runways
Direction	Length		Surface
Direction	m	ft	Surface
10/28	1,200	3,937	Asphalt
- Sources: DGCA

Seruyan Kuala Pembuang Airport (IATA: KLP, ICAO: WAGF) is an airport serving the city of Kuala Pembuang in the Seruyan Regency, in the Central Kalimantan province of Indonesia.

== Airlines and destinations ==
The following destinations are served from Seruyan Kuala Pembuang Airport:

Airlines	Destinations
Susi Air	Banjarmasin, Palangkaraya
