= Pagaruyung I inscription =

Pagaruyung I
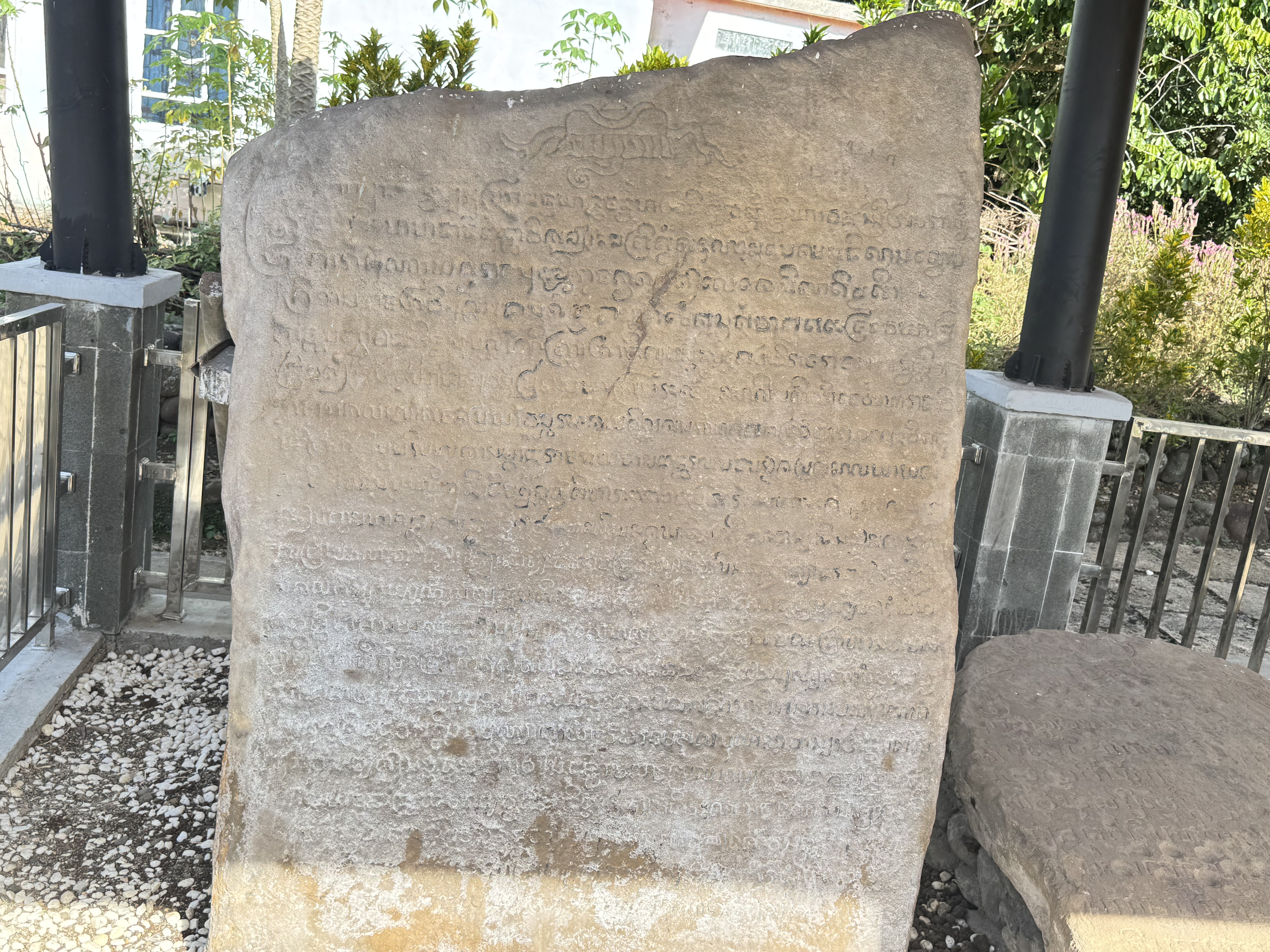
- Pagaruyung I inscription
- Type: inscription
- Material: Yellowish brown sandstone
- Size: The rectangle measures height=206 cm, width=133 cm, thickness=38 cm
- Discovered: Early 19th century
- Place: Bukit Gombak, Kecamatan Tanjung Emas
- Present location: Adityawarman Inscription Complex
- Coordinates: 0.4597310°S 100.60784°E
- Registration: 28/BCB-TB/A/12/2007
- Language: Sanskrit, Old Malay language

Location
- Pagaruyung I inscription (Sumatra) Location of inscription

Pagaruyung I inscription, also known as the Bukit Gombak I inscription, is one of the stone inscriptions from the reign of King Adityawarman in the Pagaruyung Kingdom region, West Sumatra, Indonesia. This inscription is classified as one of the most important epigraphic sources from the Old Malay period of the 14th century CE. Carved on a yellowish-brown sandstone block in the shape of an upright rectangular form, the inscription is written in Post Pallava Sumatran script using a mixture of Old Malay and Sanskrit languages. According to the chronogram wasur mmuni bhuja sthalam, it dates to 1278 Shaka (1356 CE).

This inscription was found in the Bukit Gombak area in Baringin village, Lima Kaum District, Tanah Datar Regency, before being relocated to what is now known as the Adityawarman Inscription Complex. This complex is located in the Gudam area, Pagaruyung village, Tanjung Emas District, Tanah Datar Regency. This complex is located besides the main road connecting Pagaruyung and Batusangkar. Within this complex are several inscriptions numbered Pagaruyung I through Pagaruyung VIII.

Together with seven other inscriptions from the site, the Pagaruyung I inscription forms part of the Adityawarman inscription group, which has been designated as an immovable cultural heritage object of Tanah Datar Regency under Decree No. 77/M/2019 and is recognized as National Cultural Heritage.

== Background ==
This inscription was mentioned in the official report of the Dutch colonial government through Inventaris der Oudheden in de Padangsche Bovenlanden (in Dutch, Inventory of the Antiquities in the Padang Highlands) by N.J. Krom (1912), which was compiled on the basis of field data provided by Assistant-Resident L.C. Westenenk in Fort de Kock (now Bukittinggi). In that report, Krom classified the inscribed stones in the Tanah Datar region as part of the Adityawarman-inscripties (Adityawarman inscriptions), specifically inscriptions whose content explicitly mentions King Adityawarman. In the case of inscriptions that do not mention the king’s name but employ a similar script form, Krom referred to them as inscriptions written in Adityawarman-schrift (Adityawarman script).

According to Krom, this inscription was discovered in the Bukit Gombak area, which during the colonial period was part of the Onderafdeeling (subdistrict) Fort van der Capellen. In a later period, the inscription was moved from its original location around Bukit Gombak and is now kept in the Adityawarman Inscription Complex. Now designated as a protected archaeological site, the inscription complex continues to be a site of research as well as a tourist attraction for historians and visitors interested in studying the past that shaped the culture of West Sumatra.

The Pagaruyung I inscription serves as an important medium for demonstrating the charisma and legitimacy of King Adityawarman. Through this inscription, the king’s noble qualities are presented in parallel with the gods of the Hindu-Buddhist tradition, stating that King Adityawarman possessed perfect mastery of knowledge and had courage comparable to that of the god Indra.

== Physical description ==
The Pagaruyung I inscription is located within the Adityawarman Inscription Complex, which covers an area of approximately 133 square meters. The inscription is housed under a protective pavilion with a roof shaped like the gonjong (curved, upward-pointing roof) of a rumah gadang, the traditional Minangkabau house. In the 1980s, the pavilion roof was made of ijuk (sugar palm fiber), but it has since been replaced with an aluminum roof. Surrounding the inscription is an iron fence approximately 80 cm high.

The inscription is carved on yellowish-brown quartz sandstone in an upright rectangular form. Its dimensions are 2.06 meters in height, 1.33 meters in width, and 38 centimeters in thickness. The stone now stands supported by an iron frame. The surface of the stone still shows relatively clear carvings, although some parts have experienced erosion.

The Pagaruyung I inscription is dated to 1278 Shaka or 1356 CE. It is written in Sanskrit mixed with Old Malay. The language structure and writing style indicate a strong influence from Indian cultural traditions, particularly regarding royal titles and religious activities.

=== Ornament ===
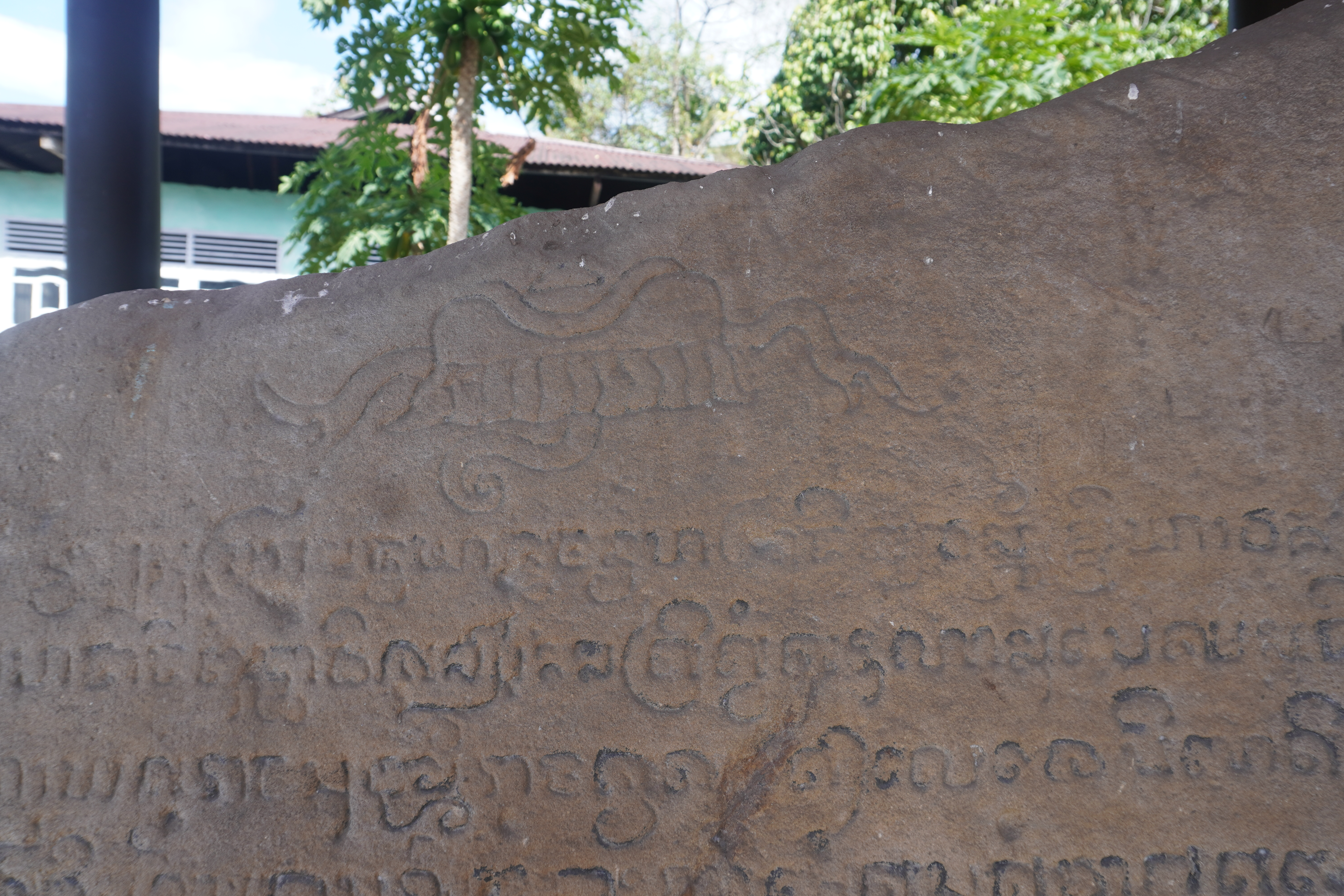
Kāla head ornament on the upper part of the inscription

At the top part of the Pagaruyung I inscription there is an ornament in the shape of a kāla (god of death) head that is rectangular, has large teeth and fangs totaling 11, a tongue sticking out long in the middle of its teeth, horns stylized to resemble a (forked) snake’s tongue, above its teeth there are two grooves like eyelids, and above them there is a small crown-shaped decoration.

== Inscription text ==
This inscription consists of 21 lines of writing; its main focus is to explain the status and position of Adityawarman and to mention his origin as the son of Adwayadwaja. The inscription contains a date of 1278 Shaka or 1356 CE and was written by an acharya (teacher-priest). The inscription is carved on a stone slab over 2 meters tall.

Facsimile of the Pagaruyung I inscription

=== Transcription ===
Below is the transcribed text of the Pagaruyung I inscription according to Harjowardojo (1966):

1. Swasyamtu prabhu (m)adwayadwajanrpa adityawarman criya, wangcacari amararyya
2. Wangsapati aradhita maitritwam karuna mupaksa mudita satwopa
3. karaguna, yatwam raja sudharmmaraja krtawat lekhesi(t)tisthati.
4. sri kamaraja adhimukti sadas (trakintha) (r)a myabhisekasutathagata bajta(w) aya a
5. (g)ajna pancasadabhijna supernna (gatra) adityawarmanrpate adhirajarajah
  Swasti
6. srimat sri ayadityawarma prataparakrama rajendramolimaniwarmmadewa maharajadhi
7. raja, sakolakajanapriya, dharmmarajakulatilaka saranagatabajrapanjara ekanggawira, du
8. sta(ri) grahacrista paripalaka saptanggaraja sayada mangundharana patapustaka pratimalaya yam ta
9. l(l)ah jirna pada sapta swarnna bhumi, diparbwatkan bihara nanawiddhaprakara sahatambak gopura kalampura
10. nan pancamahacabda, jalanda barbwat maniyammakrayadipaurnnamawasya di sanmuka
11. k bramhana(w)aryyopaddyana tyada kopadra wa tyada mulisamun, tyada rabuttrentak
12. Sakala pya sampurna sakyanyam mahima diwasak dadatu, ya datra punyambarum yam ha
13. ndak barbwinaca sasanenan sapapanam gohattya sapapanam matapitadrori sapapanam
14. swamidrohi gurudrihi, tulu ta yam mangumodana dharmmenan sapunyanam yam nguram (ma)mr
15. ta nana annadana, ya punyana yam nguram matapitabhakti, swamibhakti
16. gurubhakti, dewabhakti, sapunyana nguram maraksa cilapurnamawasya, antya(t)ama
17. nurbawa samyak sambuddhamargga. Satwopakarakrta punya sudana dharmmam jirnno
18. (lama) ya janacraya punyawrksamanittya pratapakiranai sadalokacri, adi
19. tyawarmmanpate marwadwa. Subham astu gate sake, wasur mmuni bhuja sthalam
20. waicakha pancadacake, site buddhacca ranjyatu. Krtiriyam acaryya a
21. mpuku dharmmaddhwajanama dheyassya, abhicekakarunabajra.

=== Translation ===
Below is the translation of the Pagaruyung I inscription:

1. Hail/blessings! This is the decree of the noble ruler, King Adityawarman, descendant of the arya/nobles.
2. Who is devoted to the four virtues: loving-kindness (maitrī), compassion (karuṇā), equanimity (upekṣā), and sympathetic joy (muditā),
3. as well as to the virtue of helping living beings; therefore, His Majesty, the king, protector of dharma, establishes this charter.
4. With the determination of Sri Kamarāja; sanctified through abhiṣeka according to the teachings of the Tathāgata, …
5. (learned and powerful), with a body like Suparṇa (Garuda); Adityawarman—the king, king above kings. Swasti (blessing)!
6. The noble one: Sri Ādityawarma Pratāparākrama Rājendra Mūli-Mani Varmmadewa, maharajadhiraja,
7. beloved by all the people; gem of the dharma royal family; the fortress ‘Bajrapañjara’ for those seeking protection; sole hero,
8. banisher of evil influences (para graha), protector; ruler who perfects the seven elements of the kingdom; upholder of sacred texts and image houses,
9. (in) Swarnnabhumi—formerly ruined in seven places—His Majesty built a vihara of various kinds, along with ponds, gates, and a pool,
10. as well as establishing the five symbols of greatness; built roads; offered gems; done on the full moon day, in the presence of śanmukha/attendees,
11. to the brāhmaṇa, arya, upādhyāya; let there be no injustice/disturbance; let there be no seizure of property; let there be no rabuttrentak—meaning uncertain,
12. May all be complete and perfect; may anyone attain merit on holy days; whoever plants virtue,
13. do not violate this decree. The grave sins are: killing cows (gohatyā), being disobedient to father and mother,
14. betraying lord/master, being disobedient to a teacher; but whoever rejoices in dharma and virtue will attain amṛta (eternal blessing),
15. namely through offering food (annadāna); the virtues that cultivate devotion to parents, loyalty to a lord,
16. devotion to teachers and the deities; these virtues encourage the observance of morality, especially on the full moon day; and finally,
17. direct all to the Path of the Perfect Buddha (samyak-saṃbuddha-mārga). For the sake of helping beings, he performs dana and renews the worn dharma,
18. (for a long time); relying on the people; like a tree of virtue that does not wither, radiating strength and fame throughout the world;
19. that is the (virtue of) Sri Adityawarman. May it be good! After the Śaka year (determined)—with the sengkala ‘wasur muni bhuja sthalam’—,
20. in the month of Waiśākha, the 15th day (full moon), may the teachings of the Buddha prevail. This is the work (inscription)
21. compiled by ācārya Ampuku Dharmadhvaja, who bears the title Abhiṣeka Vajra-Karūṇā.

== Interpretation ==
=== Dating ===
The Pagaruyung I inscription also contains information about the date when it was written. The dating in the inscription is written in the form of a chandrasengkala (chronogram) phrase reading wasur mmuni bhuja sthalam, meaning “the serpent god and the sage who become the arms of the world.” Each of these words has a specific numerical value which, when combined, form the year number. Wasur means 8, mmuni means 7, bhuja means 2, and sthalam means 1. These numbers are read in reverse, resulting in the year 1278 Shaka. When converted to the Common Era, it becomes 1356, by adding 78 years, because year 1 Shaka is equivalent to 78 CE.

=== Status and rank of the king ===
The inscription extols the high rank and esteemed status of King Adityawarman, portraying him as a sovereign of exceptional wisdom and authority. It highlights his mastery of religious and spiritual matters, underscoring his role not only as a political ruler but also as a spiritual leader. According to Istiawan (2006), the king adhered to the Mahayana Buddhist tradition, specifically the Tantrayana of the Bhairava sect. The inscription also uses the term sutatha bajra daiya, which can be interpreted as “a good Buddha, strong like lightning,” symbolizing the king’s moral virtue, spiritual power, and formidable authority.

=== Progenitor of the Dharmaraja dynasty ===
King Adityawarman is recognized as the progenitor of the Dharmaraja rajakula (royal family or dynasty). However, to date, there is no other evidence that this dynasty name was used during or after his reign. It appears only in the Pagaruyung I inscription, whereas the royal family name commonly associated with the Malay Kingdom of Dharmasraya was Warmadewa, as seen in Tribhuwanaraja Mauliwarmadewa.

Adityawarman himself adopted the dynasty name Warmadewa in one of his titles, Rajendra Maulimaniwarmadewa (Pagaruyung I inscription, line 6). Claiming himself as the progenitor of the Dharmaraja dynasty contradicts previous historical records, but according to Istiawan, this likely served to legitimize his position as the first king of Suwarna Bhumi (Sumatra) in the highlands following the decline of Malay Dharmasraya on the east coast. This represented his assertion to establish a new royal lineage beginning with himself.

The adoption of the title Rajendra Maulimaniwarmadewa also functioned as a political strategy to gain legitimacy from opponents by linking himself to the Malay Dharmasraya genealogy. Beyond being regarded as sutatha bajra daiya and the founder of the Dharmaraja dynasty, Adityawarman was shown to embody qualities of Indra, a Hindu deity. This reflects a syncretism between Buddhism and Hinduism during his reign, reminiscent of the religious blending that occurred under King Kertanagara of the Singhasari Kingdom.

=== The scribe ===
This inscription is unique in that it records the name of its scribe (citralekha), a distinction not found in any other inscription from Adityawarman. He is identified in lines 20 and 21 as Mpungku Dharmma Dwaja, who held the title Karuna Bajra.

== Preservation ==
The management and maintenance of the Pagaruyung I inscription are currently overseen by the Regional Cultural Preservation Office III (formerly the West Sumatra Cultural Heritage Preservation Office). The inscription has been officially recognized as a National Cultural Heritage Object, with its status formalized through Decree (SK) Number PM.05/PW.007/MKP/2010, issued by the Ministry of Culture and Tourism of the Republic of Indonesia on January 8, 2010.

The office has undertaken various measures to safeguard the Pagaruyung I inscription and several other inscriptions within the Adityawarman Inscription Complex in the vicinity of Batusangkar. In 2022, the area surrounding the complex was reorganized and improved. These efforts included upgrading infrastructure to enhance accessibility for researchers and visitors alike, installing a new protective roof to shield the inscriptions from weather-related damage, and erecting an iron fence around the site to prevent harm from wild animals.

== See also ==
- Sanskrit inscriptions in Maritime Southeast Asia
