= Pagaruyung VI inscription =

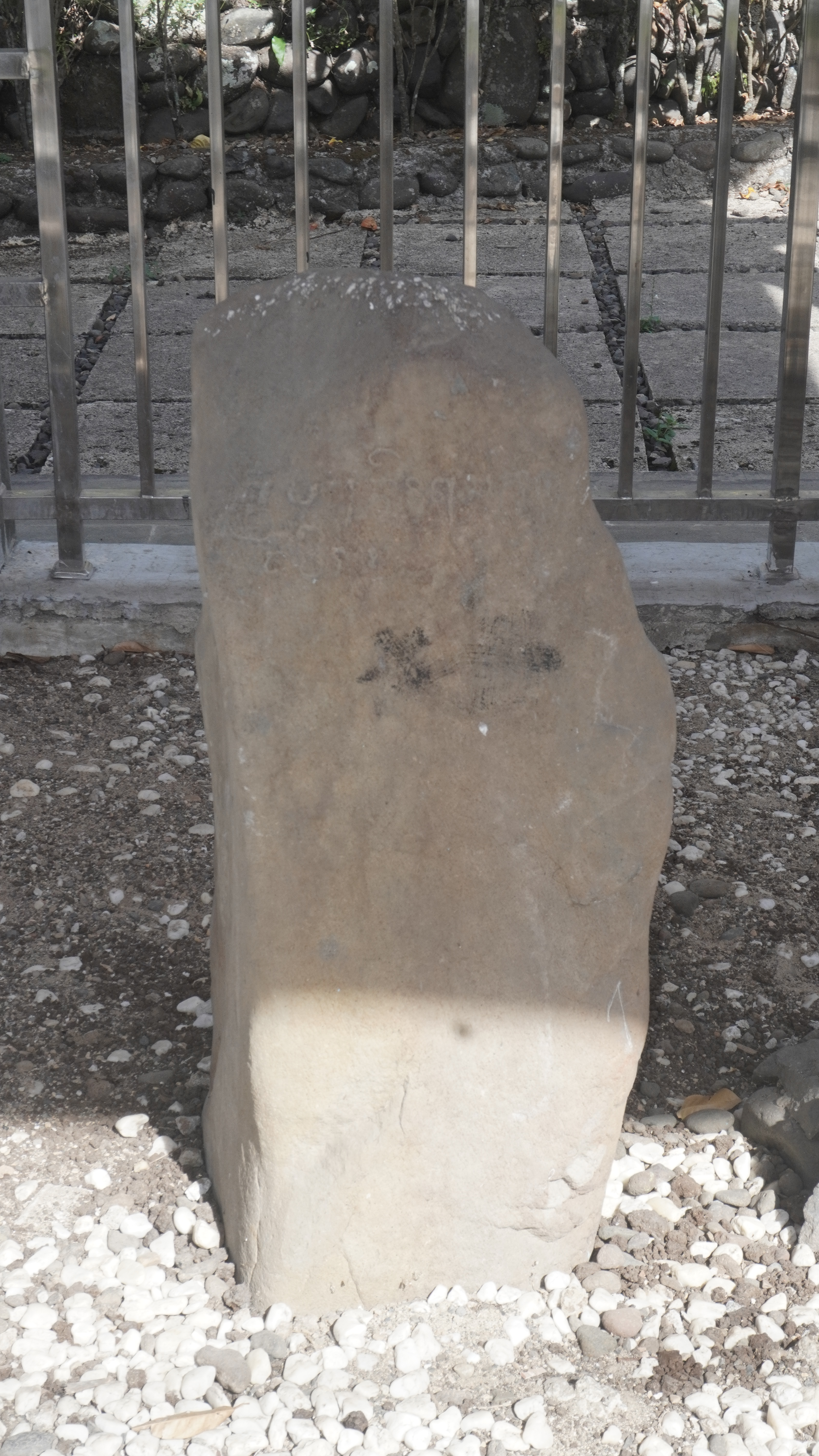
- Type: Stone inscription
- Material: Andesite stone
- Length: 36 cm
- Height: 100 cm
- Width: 46,5 cm
- Writing: Post Pallava Sumatran script
- Period/culture: Prior to or during Adityawarman's reign
- Place: Bukit Gombak, Tanah Datar Regency, West Sumatra, Indonesia
- Present location: Adityawarman Inscription Complex
- Coordinates: 0.4597310°S 100.6077240°E
- Registration: 26/BCB-TB/SMB
- Language: Old Javanese

Location
- Pagaruyung VI inscription (Sumatra) Paguruyung VI location

Pagaruyung VI inscription, formerly known as the Kapalo Bukit Gombak II inscription, is one of several inscriptions discovered at Kapalo Bukit Gombak, Baringin Nagari (village), Tanah Datar, West Sumatra, Indonesia. This monolithic stone inscription was carved on a block of andesite with a brownish-yellow hue. The text inscribed on it is closely related to the Hindu-Buddhist epigraphic tradition of the Indonesian archipelago, as it is written in Old Javanese, in contrast to most inscriptions found in West Sumatra, which are typically written in Old Malay or Sanskrit. Paleographically, the script used belongs to Post-Pallava type, dating to the late 13th or early 14th century CE.

The content of the inscription is brief, consisting of only two lines. The carved letters appear somewhat irregular, possibly reflecting the engraver’s level of skill or the carving technique employed. The text mentions a figure named Tumanggung Kudawira, who is presumed to have been a local official of medium or lower rank. Some researchers suggest that this figure may have had Javanese ancestry and lived either prior to or during the reign of King Adityawarman.

Today, the Pagaruyung VI Inscription forms part of the protected cultural heritage collection of West Sumatra. It is preserved by heritage conservation authorities along with seven other inscriptions within the Adityawarman Inscription Complex, located in Gudam Jorong, Pagaruyung Nagari, Tanah Datar Regency, West Sumatra.

== Discovery and preliminary study ==
Dr. Nicolaas Johannes Krom, Commission Head for Archaeological Research in Java and Madura, was the first to initiate the research of inscriptions in Pagaruyung. He was assigned by the Dutch East Indies Government through Regulation No. 12, dated March 23, 1912, to conduct research on artifacts and inscriptions around Fort van der Capellen, Batusangkar, West Sumatra. The research was performed from late April to May 1912. One of the inscriptions recorded as a result was the Pagaruyung VI inscription, formerly known as the Kapalo Bukit Gombak II inscription, in accordance with the location of discovery in Kapalo Bukit Gombak, Bukit Gombak Jorong (hamlet), Baringin Nagari, Lima Kaum District, Tanah Datar Regency. This inscription was inventoried as an antique by Krom and later re-published by Brandes in 1913.

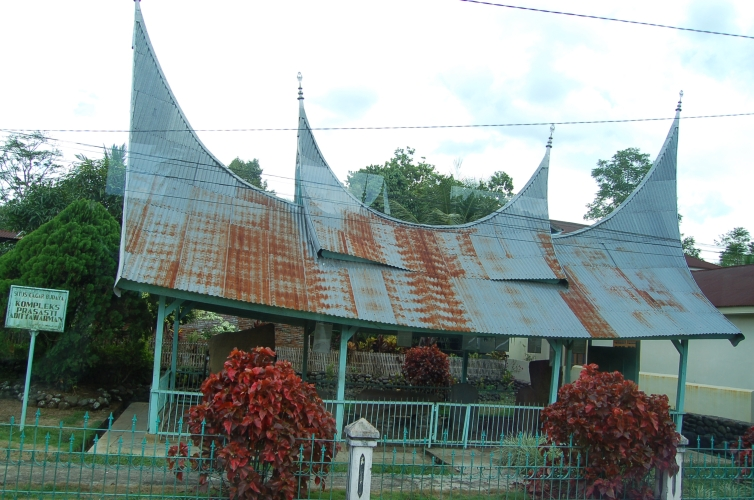
Adityawarman Inscription Complex

This inscription is one of eight inscriptions found around Bukit Gombak area, which were later collected in a single location known as the Adityawarman Inscription Complex. These inscriptions are named Pagaruyung inscription I to VIII. The Adityawarman Inscription Complex is located in Gudam Jorong, Pagaruyung Nagari, Tanjung Emas District, Tanah Datar Regency, on the roadside between Pagaruyung and Batusangkar, West Sumatra. This complex currently functions as a protected archeological site and serves as a location for historical research as well as a cultural tourism destination for communities and academicians interested in studying West Sumatra's history, especially the early kingdoms of the Minangkabau region.

== Description ==
The Pagaruyung VI inscription is carved on a monolithic andesite stone of yellowish-brown color. The rock stands vertically and is rectangular in shape, but the edges appear irregular and are not symmetrically carved. The inscription is positioned at the top of the stone surface and is carved with relatively small, rough, and visually unstructured strokes, which may reflect either technical limitations or an intention for concise writing.

In terms of dimensions, the stone measures 100 cm in height, 36 cm in width, and 46.5 cm in thickness. Although the height and width of the stone are relatively large, the proportions between the stone surface and the distribution of the writing appear unbalanced. The empty space around the text on the stone surface dominates, with text centered near the top, indicating that monumental elements may have been prioritized over complex communicative functions, as is often seen in other inscriptions containing long narratives.

== Transliteration and translation ==
The Pagaruyung VI inscription consists of only two lines. Several scholars have proposed both transliterations and translations of the original script into the Latin alphabet, as follows: (Note: Experts generally perform transliteration based on the standards of the International Alphabet of Sanskrit Transliteration (IAST))

=== Transliteration ===
Based on paleographic study, the script used in the Pagaruyung VI inscription is derived from the Pallava script, which originated in South India. According to Louis-Charles Damais (1995: 12–13), as cited by Sri Ambarwati Kusumadewi (2012), the Pallava script in Sumatra developed independently and gave rise to a distinct variant known as the Old Sumatran script, characterized by features not found elsewhere. In inscriptions from the time of King Adityawarman, several letter forms show a direct connection to the Pallava type rather than to the Old Javanese script. This suggests that the writing tradition in Sumatra evolved independently from the script developments that occurred in Java.

The following is the critical transliteration (Note: The transliteration of the Pagaruyung VI inscription has been examined through two main approaches: diplomatic transliteration and critical transliteration. Diplomatic transliteration maintains a one-to-one correspondence between the original script and the Latin alphabet, preserving the orthographic characteristics of the source text. Critical transliteration, on the other hand, adapts the written forms to reflect the phonetic sounds of the language used.) of the inscription according to Krom (1912, Archaeological Report, Quarter II, p. 43, No. 28), which was later republished by Brandes without alteration the following year:

1. oṃ pagunnira tumanggung ku
2. ḍawira

In the re-examination by Arlo Griffith (2012), there is an alternative view regarding the form of the letters and their interpretation. Parentheses indicate two possible readings, namely pabhunnira or pagunnira. The following is the diplomatic transliteration according to Griffith, as follows:

1. °om̐ pa(bh/g)unnira tumaṅguṃ ku-
2. ḍa vira |

=== Translation ===
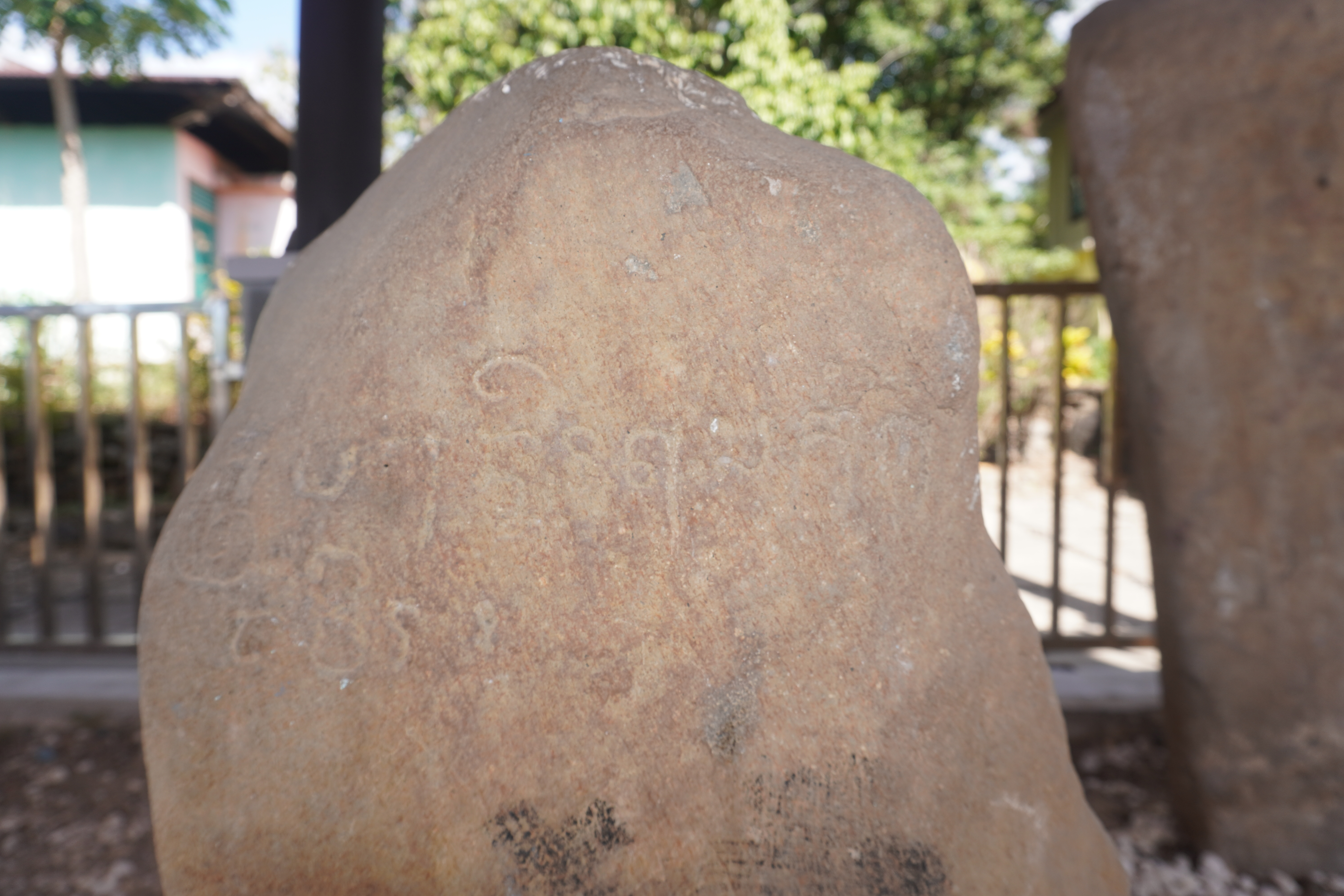
Close up on the writing on the upper part of the stone

The symbol °om̐ (Oṁ) that appears at the beginning of the inscription is a sacred invocation commonly found in ancient Hindu-Buddhist manuscripts. Its use signifies the beginning of a text regarded as sacred or religiously significant, particularly within the Shaiva Siddhanta tradition originating from South India. In Indonesia, this tradition venerates the Tripurusa—Brahma, Vishnu, and Shiva as the supreme deity—and their manifestations through the lingam and the sacred syllable Om. The presence of this symbol in inscriptions issued by government officials often signifies an act of devotion or ritual consecration.

Both Krom and Brandes proposed the reading oṃ pagunnira tumaṅguṅ kuḍavira as a possible interpretation of the text, though they did not suggest any translation.

The first proposed translation was offered by Machi Suhadi (1990), who interpreted the text as:

"Hail the fact that Tumanggung Kudawira has been made firm"

Later on, Budi Istiawan (2006) suggested an alternative translation:

"Happiness. On the basis of the result of the work of Tumanggung Kudawira"

Subsequently, Arlo Griffiths (2012) criticized both of the earlier translations, arguing that the word pagunnira, from both grammatical and lexical perspectives, cannot be interpreted as “the fact of having been made firm” or “result of work.” Based on paleographic analysis, the root word pagun (with the added suffix -nira) according to Zoetmulder’s Old Javanese Dictionary (1982:1231) means “solid foundation” or “support” (pagon in modern Javanese). Thus, pagunnira may metaphorically signify “his resting place” or “his tomb.” Furthermore, Griffiths also proposed a variant reading pabhunnira, derived from pa-awu-an (Old Javanese: “cremation site” or “place where ashes are kept”). From these analyses, Griffiths proposed two possible translations of the inscription:

"Om̐. The resting place of lord Kuḍa Vīra", and
"Om̐. The ash-deposit of lord Kuḍa Vīra".

== Historical context and interpretation ==
The Pagaruyung VI inscription mentions a figure, Tumanggung Kudawira, who, according to Uli Kozok, is thought to have been a Javanese official of middle or lower rank. This social status cannot yet be definitively ascertained from the inscription alone. According to paleographic analysis and comparison of names in other inscriptions, his lifetime is estimated to be before or during the reign of Adityawarman (13th-14th century). The title tumanggung itself is an administrative position commonly used in the government systems of kingdoms in Java, such as Singhasari and Majapahit. The name Kudawira can be etymologically interpreted as "a gallant horse", which may represent the heroic or symbolic nature of the officer. Based on the title and elements of the name, it is highly likely that Kudawira was an important person of Javanese descent. However, his complete identity cannot be confirmed because no other sources have been found that mention his name.

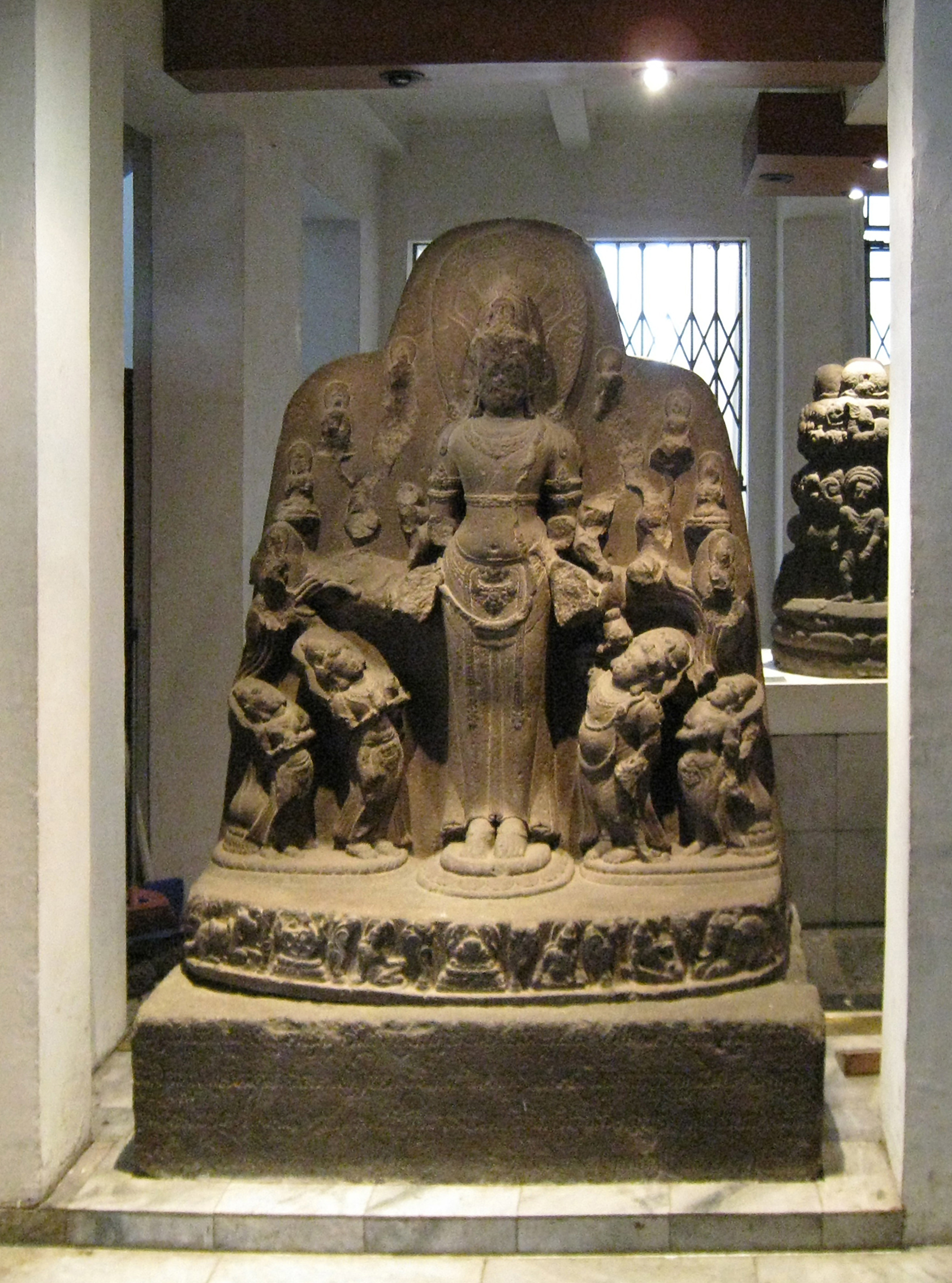
The Padang Roco inscription, engraved on the base of the Amoghapasa statue, mentions the figure Rakryan Damung Pu Vira. Griffiths suspects a connection with Tumanggung Kuda Wira on the Pagaruyung VI inscription, based on the similarity of the name and the Javanese title used.

Budi Istiawan estimates that the inscription dates from before the reign of King Adityawarman. This is based on Adityawarman's historical background, who is equated with the son of Dara Petak, a noblewoman from the Malay Kingdom who is mentioned in the Pararaton book as being brought to Java by the Singhasari troops upon their return from the Pamalayu expedition. Istiawan believes that Tumanggung Kudawira may have been a member of the expedition, who came to Sumatra before Adityawarman's time.

Likewise, interpretations of the function of this inscription also vary. According to Istiawan, the Pagaruyung VI inscription can be interpreted as a form of appreciation or confirmation of authority for the services of Tumanggung Kudawira. Thus, this inscription likely functioned as an authoritative seal or stamp that marked the status or role of the officer. In contrast, Arlo Griffiths argues that this inscription is not an official royal inscription. He noted that it does not contain the name of the king, the year, important events, or administrative information commonly found in official inscriptions of the Adityawarman kingdom. Therefore, Griffiths concludes that this inscription is more appropriately understood as a memorial or grave marker.

Griffiths strengthens his argument by mentioning the existence of names with phonetic or structural similarities in a number of other inscriptions from the adjacent period and region. One example is a person named Biraparākramakuda in the Pagaruyung VII inscription (also called the Gudam II inscription) in Old Malay, which is now stored alongside the Pagaruyung VI inscription. In addition, the Padang Roco inscription inscribed on the base of the Amoghapāśa statue and dated 1286 CE also records the presence of a Javanese official named Rakryān Damuṅ Pu Vīra, who was part of the Singhasari diplomatic mission to Sumatra (dari Bhūmi Jāva ka Svarṇnabhūmi).

Although the Padang Roco inscription dates to an earlier period—ranging from several decades to more than a century earlier—Griffiths suggests that the emergence of Old Javanese elements in West Sumatran inscriptions may reflect the possibility of a direct migration process from Java, or even a continuity of lineage among Javanese officials such as Rakryān Damuṅ Pu Vīra. He also emphasizes that this issue remains open for further study, and is part of his plan to write an epigraphic monograph on the Adityawarman inscriptions.

== Preservation effort ==
This inscription has been officially recognized as a National Cultural Heritage Site. The cultural heritage status was determined through Decree (SK) Number 77/M/2019, issued on March 12, 2019, by the Ministry of Education and Culture of the Republic of Indonesia.

== See also ==
- Pagaruyung kingdom
