= Seruyan Regency =

Regency in Central Kalimantan, Indonesia

Seruyan Regency Kabupaten Seruyan
- Regency
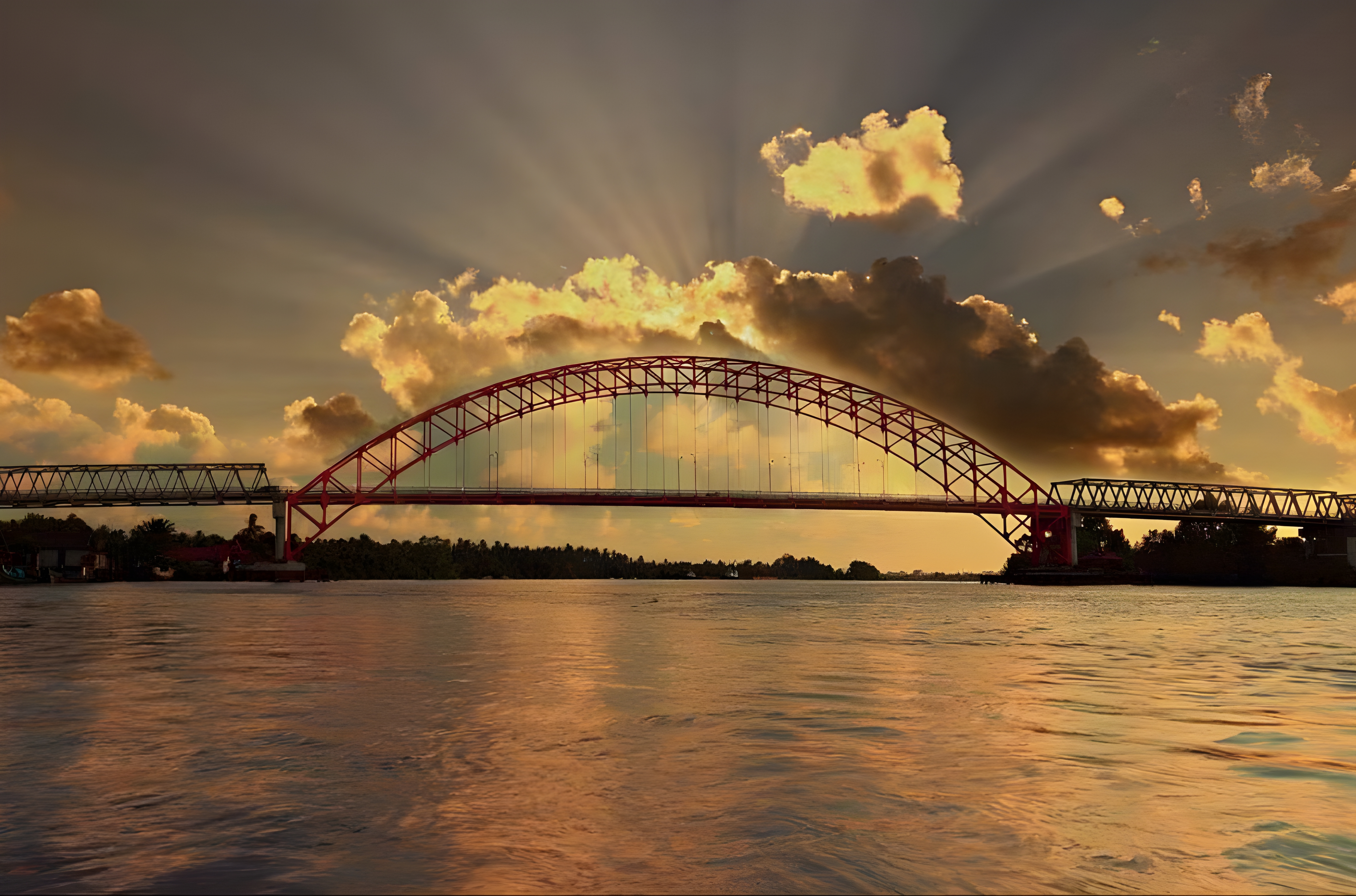
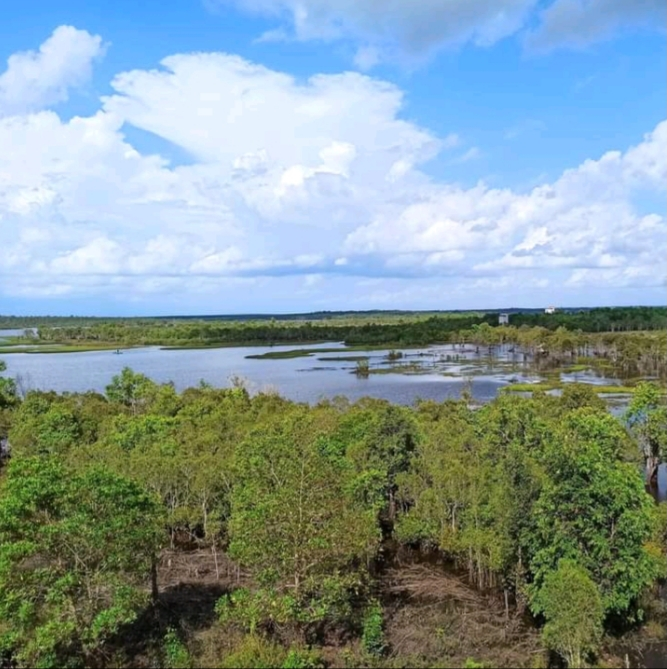
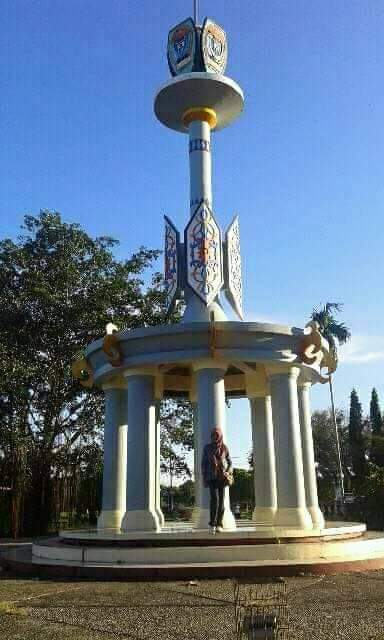
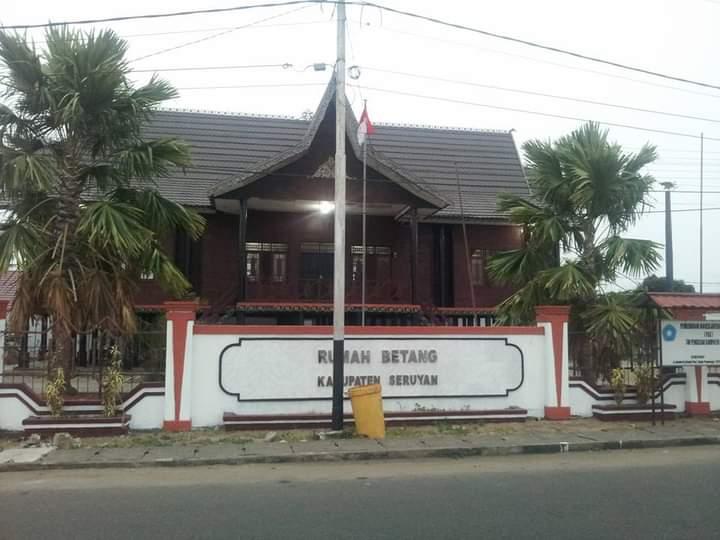
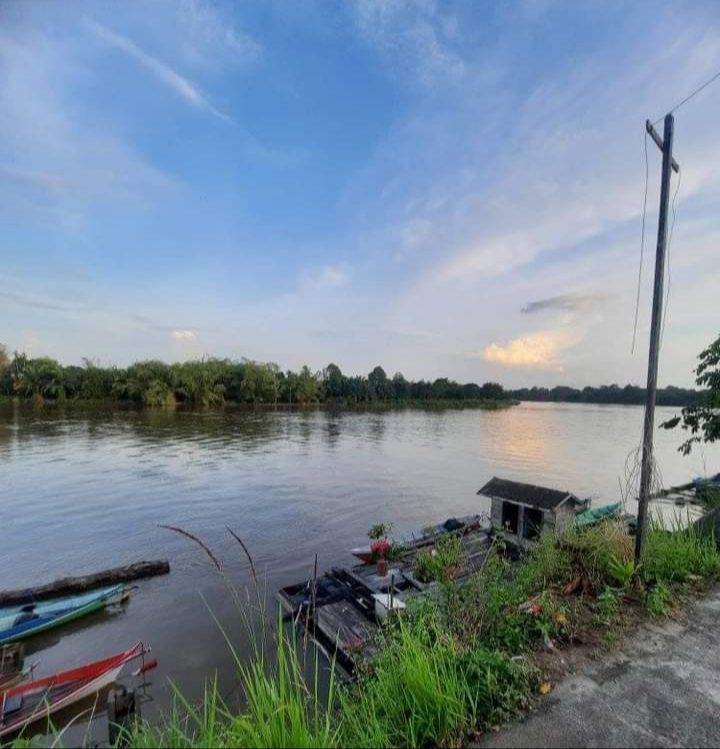
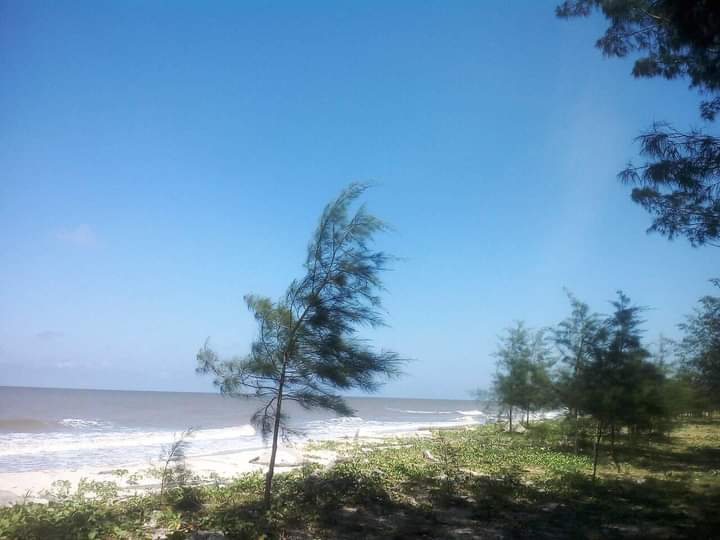
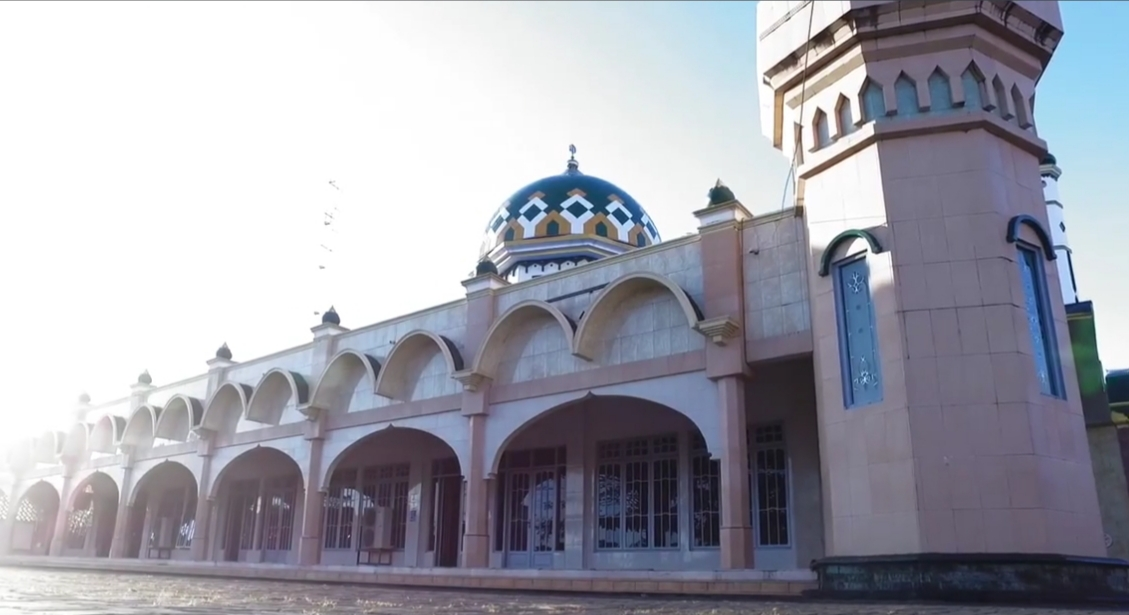

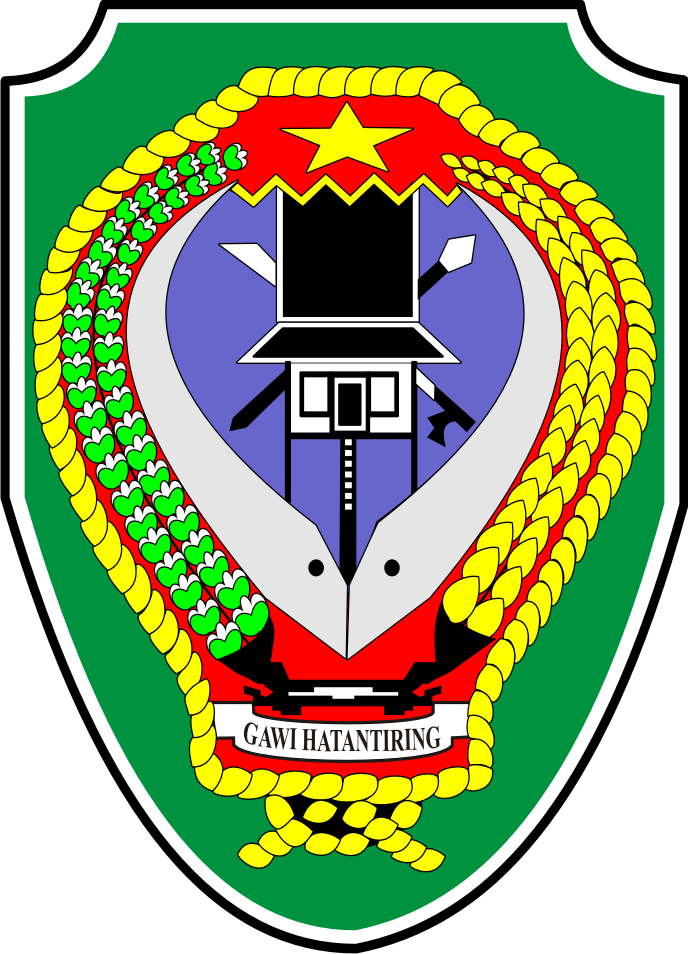
- Coat of arms
- Motto(s): "Gawi Hatantiring"; Ngaju language: "Cooperative teamwork"
- Location within Central Kalimantan

- Location in Kalimantan and Indonesia Seruyan Regency (Indonesia)
- Coordinates: 2.3333°S 112.2500°E
- Country: Indonesia
- Region: Kalimantan
- Province: Central Kalimantan
- Capital: Kuala Pembuang

Government
  - Regent: Ahmad Selanorwanda
  - Vice Regent: Supian

Area
  - Total: 16,404 km^{2} (6,334 sq mi)

Population (mid 2025 estimate)
  - Total: 177,320
  - Density: 10.810/km^{2} (27.997/sq mi)
- Time zone: UTC+7 (Western Indonesia Time)
- Area code: (+62) 519
- Website: seruyankab.go.id

Seruyan Regency (Indonesian: Kabupaten Seruyan) is one of the thirteen regencies which comprise the Central Kalimantan Province on the island of Kalimantan (Borneo), Indonesia. It was created on 10 April 2002 from what were previously the western districts of East Kotawaringin Regency, and covers a land area of 16,404 km^{2}. It was named after the Seruyan River, of 350 km length, which flows through the area of the regency. The town of Kuala Pembuang in Seruyan Hilir District is the capital of Seruyan Regency, with nearly 20,000 inhabitants. The population of the Regency was 139,931 at the 2010 Census and 162,906 at the 2020 census; the official estimate was at mid 2025 was 177,320 (comprising 93,570 males and 83,750 females).

== History ==
- In 1787, the Pambuang Banjar area which was part of the Banjar Sultanate was handed over by Sunan Nata Alam to the VOC Netherlands. The area was then formed into a district named Van Pemboewan.
- After Van Pemboewan ended in 1946 and was replaced by Great Dayak, a district was formed with the name Seruyan district.
- Seruyan district Government in 1946. The "Onderdistrictshoofd" government was changed to a District under the name Seruyan District with its capital city being Kuala Pembuang.
- 1947. This year the Seruyan District area was divided into two districts, namely: Seruyan Hilir District with the capital city of Kuala Pembuang and being the legal territory of Kawedanan Sampit Barat, Seruyan Hulu District with the capital in overseas Pulut and becoming the legal territory of Kawedanan Sampit North.
- The Seruyan area at that time was included in the Level I Province of South Kalimantan (before the Province of Central Kalimantan was formed in 1957) and in the Level II Regency of Kotawaringin (before it was divided in 1959 into the two regencies of East Kotawaringin and West Kotawaringin).
- 1958. The Seruyan Hulu District was divided into two districts, namely: Central Seruyan District with its capital at Rantau Pulut, and Seruyan Hulu District with its capital at Tumbang Manjul.
- 1961. The Seruyan Hilir district was divided into two districts, namely: Seruyan Hilir District with its capital at Kuala Pembuang and Hanau District with its capital at Pembuang Hulu.
- 1963. The Seruyan Hilir district was further divided into two districts, namely: Seruyan Hilir District with its capital at Kuala Pembuang and the Danau Sembuluh District with its capital at Telaga Pulang.
- Seruyan Kawedanan Administration in 1963. With the rapid development of the division of several districts, then with the Decree of the Governor of the First Level Region of Central Kalimantan Number: 06/Pem.330-c-2-3/1963 dated June 1, 1963 concerning the Determination of Kawedanan fun. Kawedanan Seruyan oversaw five districts with its capital city Kuala Pembuang.
- The five districts were: Seruyan Hilir District with its capital at Kuala Pembuang, Danau Sembuluh District with its capital at Telaga Pulang, Hanau District with its capital at Pembuang Hulu, and Seruyan Tengah District with its capital at Rantau Pulut.
- Government of the Seruyan Level II Preparatory Region in 1965. With some changes in the Government Organizational Structure, with the issuance of the Decree of the Governor of the Head of the Level I Region of Central Kalimantan No: 05/Pem.232-c-2-4/1965 dated May 1, 1965 concerning Stipulation Seruyan Level II Preparatory Region.
- In connection with this, the status of the Seruyan Kawedanan Government changed to a Seruyan Level II Preparatory District with its capital at Kuala Pembuang. The Government of the East Kotawaringin Seruyan Region was formed based on: Minister of Home Affairs Decree Number 64 of 1979 dated 28 April 1979 concerning the Establishment of the Assistant Regent of Kapuas for the Gunung Mas Region, the Assistant Regent of East Kotawaringin for the Katingan Region, the Assistant Regent of East Kotawaringin for the Seruyan Region, the Assistant Regent of East Kotawaringin for the Seruyan Region. North Barito Regent for Murung Raya Region, Assistant South Barito Regent for East Barito Region, Decree of the Governor of the First Level Region of Central Kalimantan Number: 148/KPTS/1979 dated 28 June 1979 concerning the Elimination of the Status of the Region and Level II Administrative Office of Gunung Mas, Katingan, Murung Raya and East Barito as well as the Status of the Seruyan Region and Preparatory Office for Level II Regions, and the Decree of the Governor of the Head of the Level I Region of Central Kalimantan Number: 247/KPTS/1980 dated July 2, 1980 concerning Organizational Structure and Work Procedures of the Assistant Office of the East Kotawaringin Regent for the Fun Region an. The Administration of the Assistant Regent of the Regent (TUBUP) of the East Kotawaringin Seruyan Region with the capital domiciled at Kuala Pembuang.
- The Seruyan Regency Government was established based on Law Number 5 of 2002 concerning the Establishment of 8 new regencies in Central Kalimantan Province - Katingan Regency, Seruyan Regency, Sukamara Regency, Lamandau Regency, Gunung Mas Regency, Pulang Pisau Regency, Murung Raya Regency and East Barito Regency, which were inaugurated by the Minister of Home Affairs on behalf of the President of the Republic of Indonesia on July 2, 2002 in Jakarta. The capital of Seruyan Regency is Kuala Pembuang, Seruyan Hilir District under the Temporary Leader, Loper Anggus.
- The election of Darwan Ali as the first regent of Seruyan Regency started a new chapter for this Regency. Under Darwan Ali's leadership, a large number of Seruyan areas were built and renovated.

== Administrative districts ==
At the 2010 Census, Seruyan Regency consisted of five districts (kecamatan), but subsequently each of these districts was split in two. The consequent ten districts are tabulated below with their areas and population totals from the 2010 Census and the 2020 Census, together with the official estimate as at mid 2025. The table also includes the locations of the district administrative centres, the number of administrative villages in each district (a total of 97 rural desa and 3 urban kelurahan), and its postal codes.

Kode Wilayah	Name of District (kecamatan)	Area in km^{2}	Pop'n Census 2010	Pop'n Census 2020	Pop'on Estimate mid 2025	Admin Centre	No. of villages	Post codes
62.07.01	Seruyan Hilir (Lower Seruyan)	4,659.00	36,246	37,382	41,370	Kuala Pembuang	10 ^{(a)}	74213 -74215
62.07.06	Seruyan Hilir Timur (East Lower Seruyan)	1,428.00	^{(b)}	9,193	10,900	Pematang Panjang	6	74215
62.07.03	Danau Sembuluh (Lake Sembuluh)	1,555.00	29,335	13,596	15,870	Telaga Pulang	8	74261
62.07.07	Seruyan Raya (Great Seruyan)	869.00	^{(b)}	19,344	20,100	Terawan	5	74260
62.07.04	Hanau	549.00	34,951	20,834	22,560	Pembuang Hulu	7	74270
62.07.08	Danau Seluluk	586.00	^{(b)}	17,556	18,650	Asam Baru	6	74271
62.07.02	Seruyan Tengah (Central Seruyan)	1,343.32	27,422	23,719	25,740	Rantau Pulut	20 ^{(c)}	74280
62.07.09	Batu Ampar	668.68	^{(b)}	9,424	9,930	Sandul	9	74281
62.07.05	Seruyan Hulu (Upper Seruyan)	3,262.00	11,977	9,155	9,410	Tumbang Manjul	20	74291
62.07.10	Suling Tambun	1,484.00	^{(b)}	2,703	2,810	Tumbang Langkai	9	74290
	Totals	16,404.00	139.931	162,906	177,320	Kuala Pembuang	100	

Note: (a) including two kelurahan - Kuala Pembuang I (with 8,632 inhabitants as at 2024) and Kuala Pembuang II (with 11,085 inhabitants as at 2024).
(b) the 2010 population of this new District is included in the figure for the district immediately preceding it in the table. (c) including one kelurahan - Rantau Pulut.

== Transports ==
The regency is served by the Seruyan Kuala Pembuang Airport (IATA: KLP).
