= Afdeling =

Colonial unit in the Dutch East Indies

Afdeling, formerly spelt afdeeling (the Dutch for "department", "section" or "district"), was an administrative area during the Dutch East Indies colonial administration at the district level. The post of administrator was held by an assistant resident. An afdeling is part of a residency and may consist of several onderafdelingen or "subdistricts" (kawedanan level ruled by a Dutch "wedana" called a Controleur) and a landschap headed by an Bumiputera called a hoofd or head.

In the plantation sector, an afdeling is an administrative division of a garden.

== See also ==
- Administrative divisions of the Dutch East Indies
- Inlands Bestuur
- Onderdistrict
- Pemboewan
- Kewedanan
