= Kuala Pembuang =

Kuala Pembuang كوالا فمبواڠ
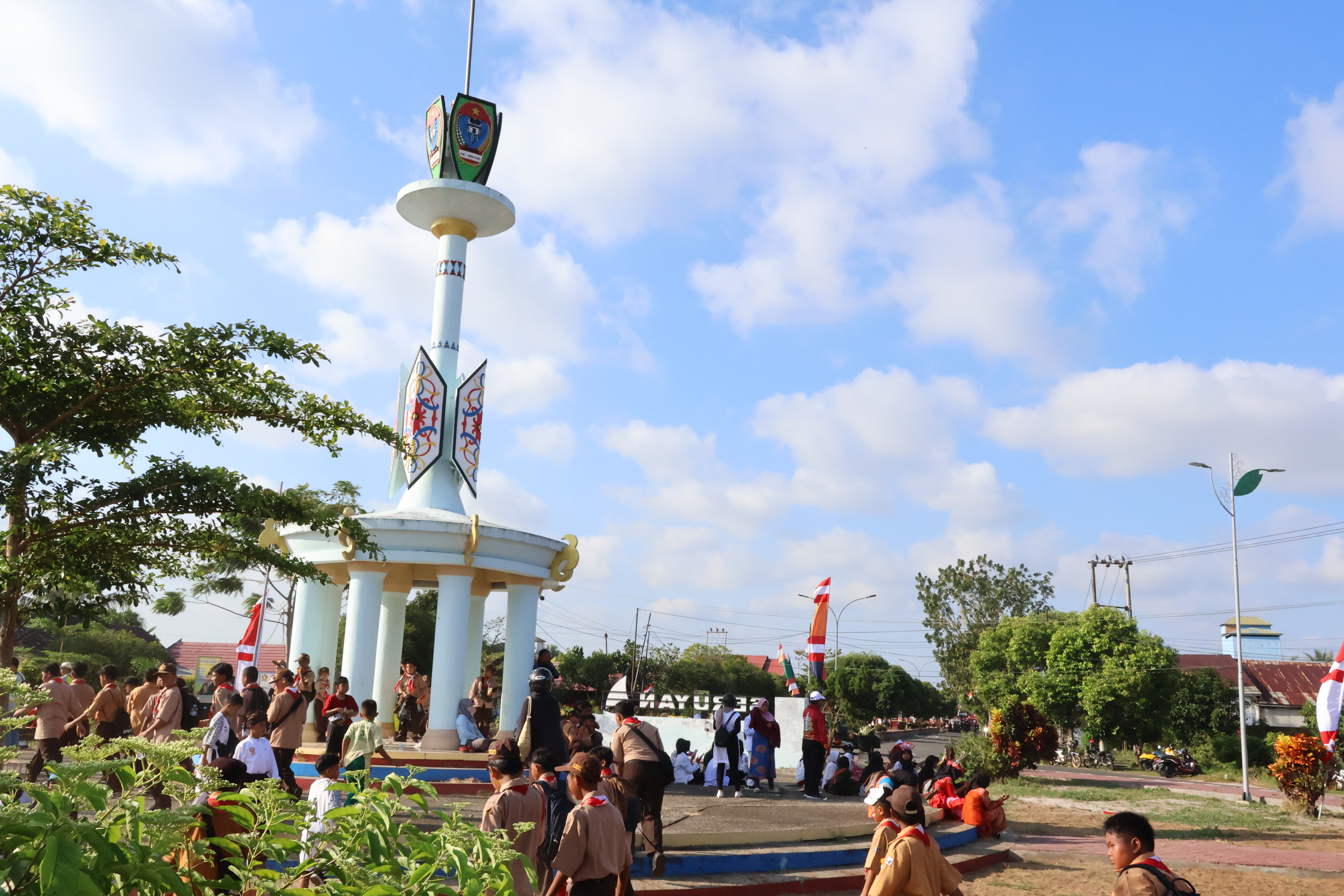
- Kuala Pembuang during the carnival held to commemorate the 79th anniversary of the Republic of Indonesia.

- Kuala Pembuang town
- Coordinates: 3.3871°S 112.5434°E
- Country: Indonesia
- Province: Central Kalimantan
- Regency: Seruyan Regency
- Inauguration of the capital: 1905

Area
  - Total: 123.1 km^{2} (47.5 sq mi)

Population (2021)
  - Total: 19,717
  - Density: 292/km^{2} (760/sq mi)
- Time zone: UTC+7 (WIB)

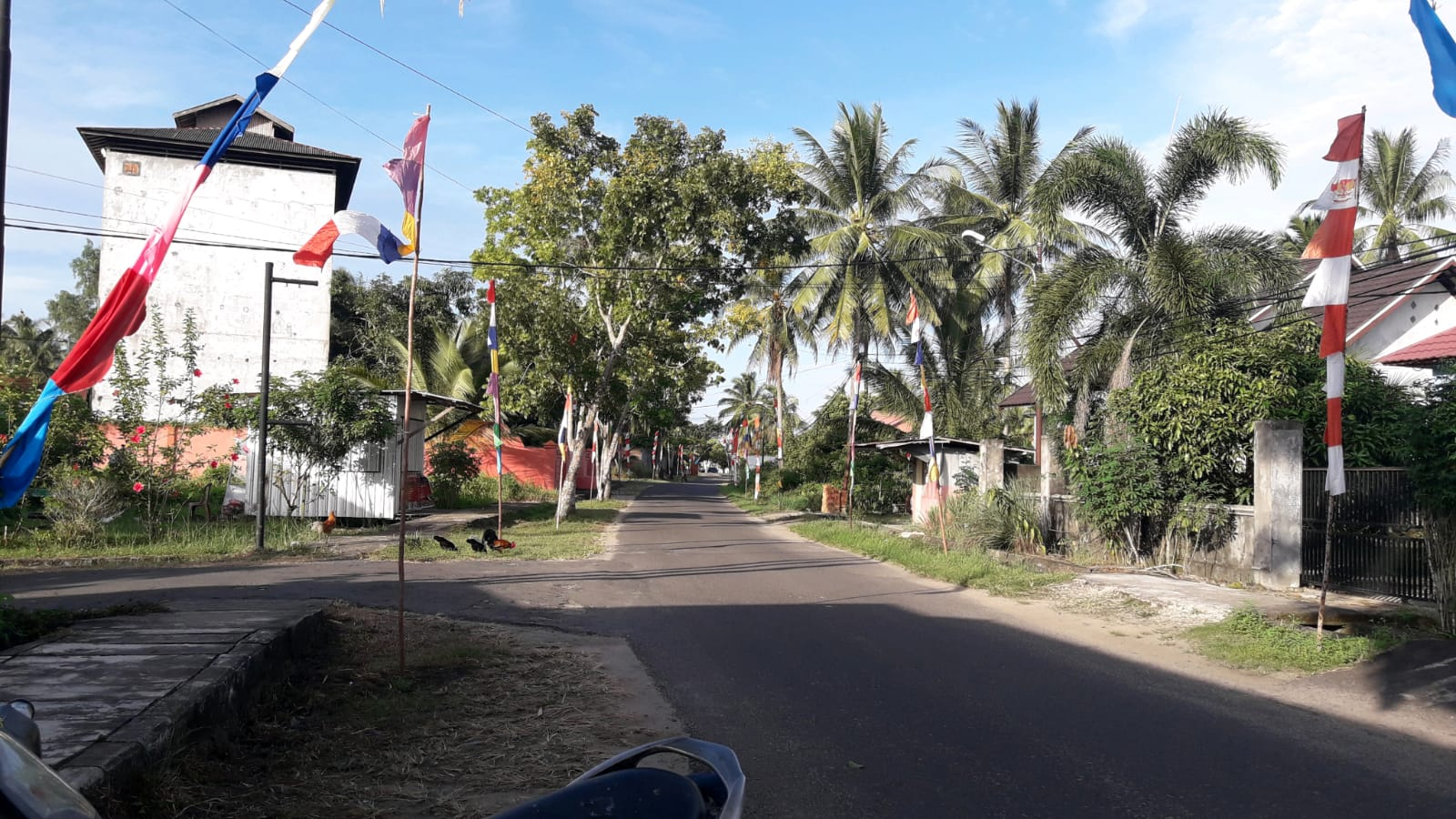
Kuala Pembuang in August 2022.

Kuala Pembuang (abbreviated: KLP; Banjar: كوالا فمبواڠ, romanized: Kuwala Pambuwang) is the capital, administrative center, and economic center of Seruyan Regency, Central Kalimantan, Indonesia. Initially, Kuala Pembuang formed a single administrative urban village or kelurahan (in the administrative division of the Seruyan Hilir district) before being divided into two kelurahan, namely Kuala Pembuang I (covering 49 km^{2}) and Kuala Pembuang II (covering 74 km^{2}).

Kuala Pembuang and its surroundings are known to be rich in natural resources and have beautiful natural scenery. Thus, this town has many places of interest to tourists. Even so, the development of this town is still constrained by limited funds.

== Geography ==
Kuala Pembuang is located south of the Seruyan river (or Pembuang river). The town's coordinates are at 3.3874° South Latitude and 112°.5434 East Longitude. Administratively, the town is located in Seruyan Hilir District . This town is located to the southwest of Palangka Raya, the capital city of Central Kalimantan with the distance about ±370 km. The total area of this town is approximately 123.1 km² which makes it roughly 0.75% of the total area of Seruyan Regency.

Kuala Pembuang, Central Kalimantan

Climate chart (precipitation, max. and min. temperature)
J	F	M	A	M	J	J	A	S	O	N	D
265 31 24	245 32 25	283 32 25	279 32 25	211 32 25	183 31 25	141 31 25	108 31 25	122 32 25	202 32 25	266 31 25	299 31 25
- █ Average max. and min. temperatures in °C
- █ Precipitation totals in mm
- Source: Climate-Data.org & BMKG
Imperial conversion
J	F	M	A	M	J	J	A	S	O	N	D
10 88 76	9.6 89 76	11 89 76	11 89 77	8.3 89 77	7.2 88 78	5.6 87 77	4.3 88 77	4.8 90 77	8 89 77	10 89 76	12 88 76
- █ Average max. and min. temperatures in °F
- █ Precipitation totals in inches

Kuala Pembuang is located on the banks of Seruyan River and is very adjacent to the river's estuary into Java Sea. This town is also situated on the lowlands of the southern coast of Central Kalimantan with the altitude being somewhere between 1 and 15 metres above sea level. As other towns and cities in Borneo, this town experiences tropical rainforest climate (Af) with high amount of precipitation most of the year, constantly high humidity, and persistent warm-to-hot temperature.

== History ==
=== Samudin ===
Several local oral traditions mention Datuk Samudin as the first person to occupy the area around Sungai Perlu and opened access to Kuala Pembuang and established settlements there. For the people of Seruyan Hilir, Samudin is a respected person and they regard him as an ancestor.

=== Sultanate of Banjar ===
Pembuang is one of the oldest settlements in Seruyan Regency, the name of this area has already been mentioned in the Hikayat Banjar whose last part was written in 1663. The name of Pembuang was given by Prince Dipati Anta-Kasuma son of the 4th Sultan of Banjar Mustain Billah, because originally the place was going to be the capital of the kingdom to be founded by him, but then it was canceled (Banjar: Pambuang means wasted).

In 1878, Tahmidullah II of Banjar handed over Pembuang and its surroundings to the Dutch East India Company. This area was made an Onderdistrict of the Dutch East Indies under the name Onderdistrict Pemboewan (Pembuang).

1905, The Pemboewan government with its capital in Pembuang Hulu was moved to Kuala Pembuang, due to its strategic location on the south coast, especially for government, transportation and the economic activities at that time.

=== Under Seruyan Administration ===
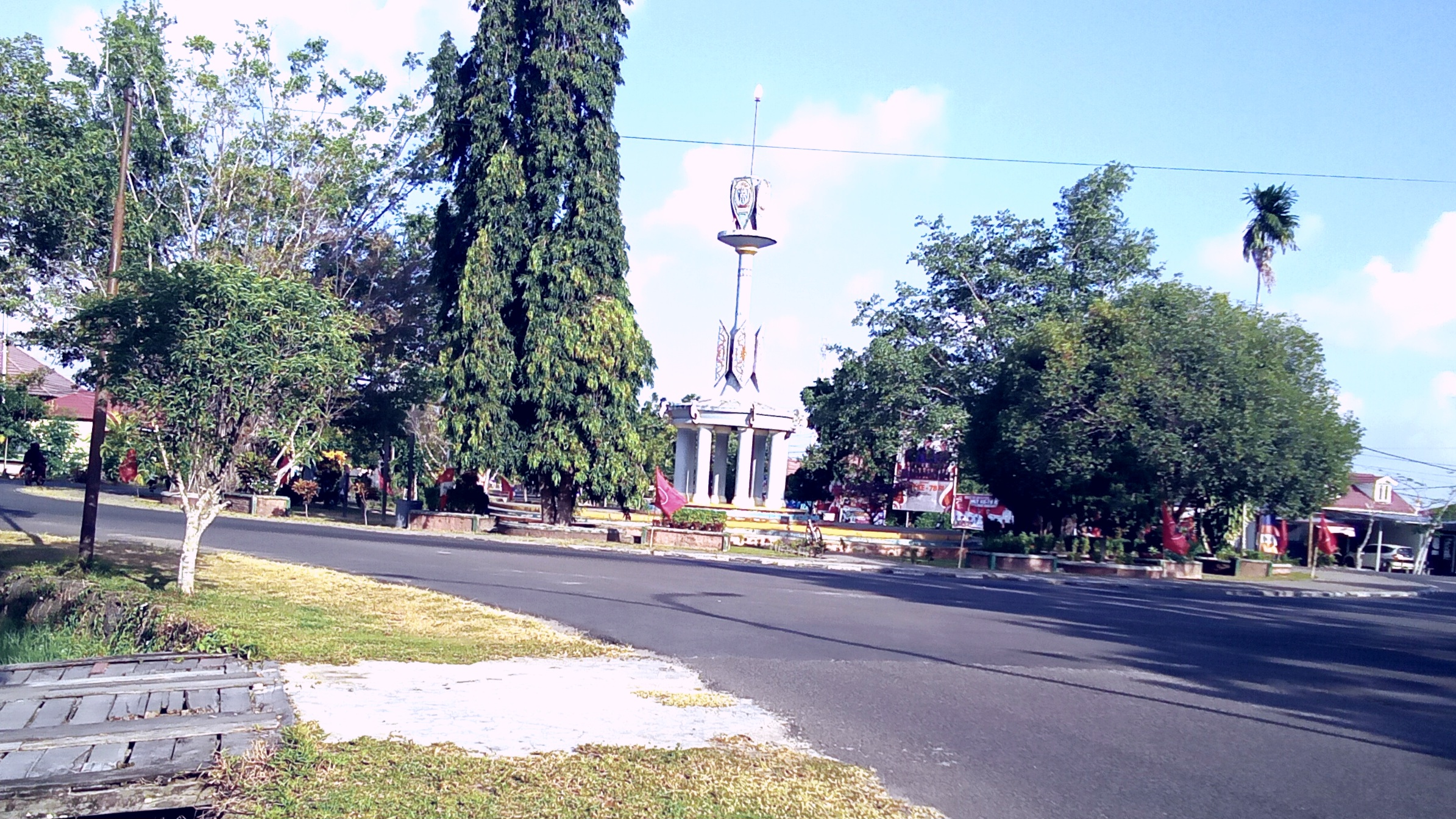
The Tameng Roundabout of Kuala Pembuang during the regency of Yulhaidir (r. 2018–2024).

Seruyan District Government in 1946. The Pemboewan government was changed to a district with the name Seruyan District with its administrative centre being Kuala Pembuang.

In 2002, the Seruyan District Government was changed to Seruyan Regency with the capital city at Kuala Pembuang. Temporary Officer, Loper Anggus.

In 2003, Darwan Ali was elected as the first regent of Seruyan Regency. He then carried out construction in the Seruyan Regency area, especially the capital, Kuala Pembuang.

== Government ==
Kuala Pembuang is administratively divided into two urban villages (kelurahan), namely Kuala Pembuang I and Kuala Pembuang II. The government of each kelurahan rests on a Lurah who is appointed directly by the Regent of Seruyan Regency. The government in Kuala Pembuang is unique because it is not regulated by a single government, but each Lurah manages his own Kelurahan. Kuala Pembuang, apart from being the Seruyan Regency capital, is also the capital of the Seruyan Hilir District.

== Economy ==
Most people of Kuala Pembuang work as farmers. This is because the land in Kuala Pembuang is very large while the populated area is very small. Apart from being farmers, the Kuala Pembuang people also rely on the produce from the Sea and the Pembuang River, making flatfish crackers (a typical food of the Seruyan Regency), and becoming workers. After Sudarsono's regency, Kuala Pembuang's economy began to shift to the palm oil industry, although there are still many changes that need to be made.
