= Pagaruyung VII inscription =

Inscription found in Pagaruyung, West Sumatra, Indonesia

Pagaruyung VII Gudam II
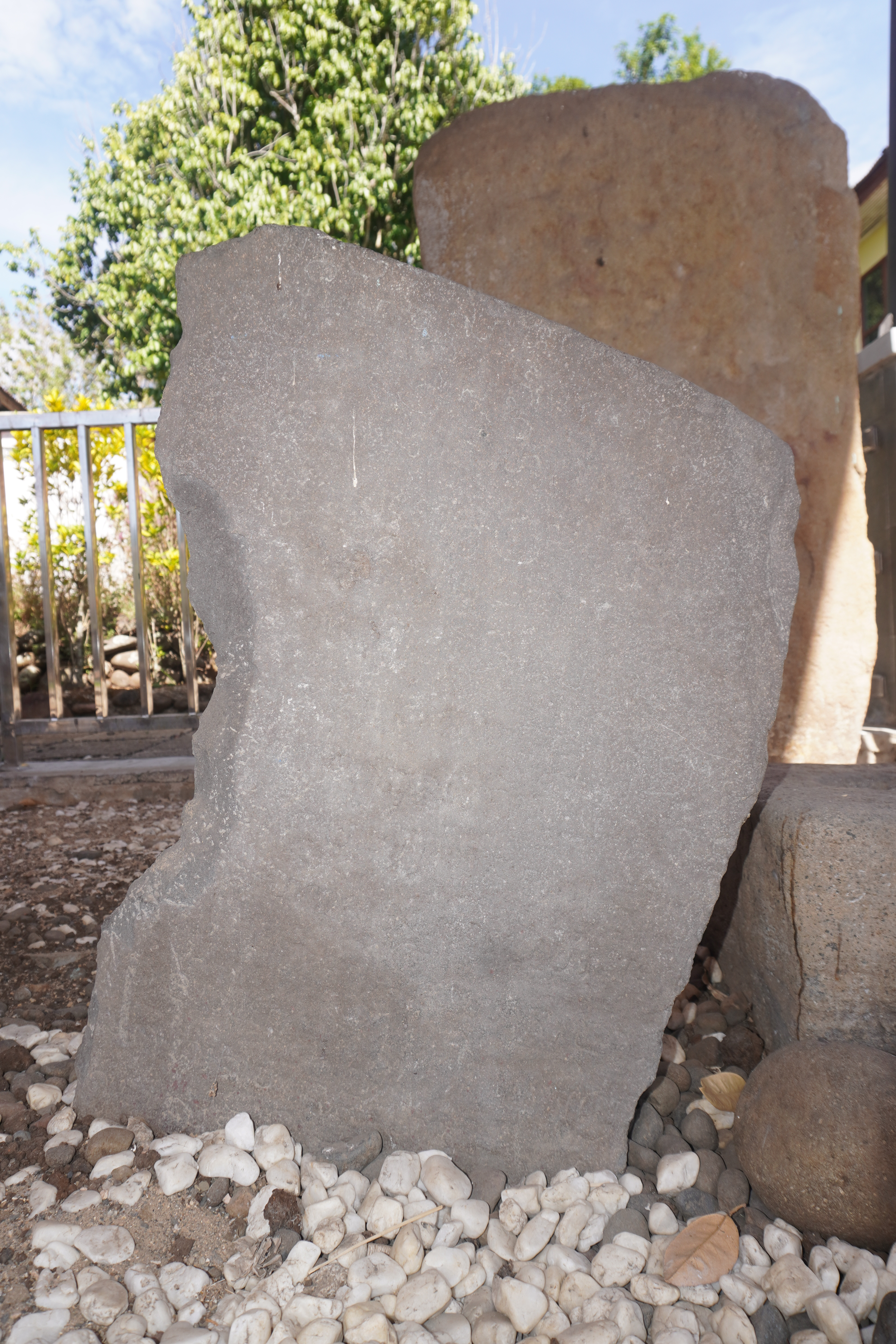
- Type: Inscription
- Material: Andesite
- Size: 10 by 50 by 82 centimetres (3.9 in × 19.7 in × 32.3 in)
- Writing: Post-Pallava script
- Period/culture: Kingdom of Sri Akarendrawarmman
- Discovered: Gudam, Tanjung Emas, Tanah Datar
- Present location: Adityawarman Inscription Complex
- Coordinates: 0.4597310°S 100.6077240°E
- Identification: KB003142
- Registration: No. SK: 77/M/2019 (date: March 12, 2019)
- Language: Old Malay language, Sanskrit
- Culture: Pagaruyung culture

Location
- Pagaruyung VII inscription (Sumatra) Paguruyung VII location

Pagaruyung VII inscription, also known as Gudam II inscription, is an inscription founded in Gudam, Pagaruyung Nagari (Village), Tanjung Emas District, Tanah Datar Regency, in West Sumatra, Indonesia. This inscription consists of 16 lines of writing that written in Old Malay language, with some terms in Sanskrit and Old Javanese languages, and written in Post-Pallava script. This inscription does not have any date, but was estimated written around the 14th century.

Writings in this inscription almost cannot be read due to its state. However, there is a line that include a king's name, which is Srimat Sri Akarendrawarman, which has a title of Maharajadhiraja. Besides, there is a writing about curses to those who did not follow king's orders on the inscription. Latest research shows that this inscription most likely issued by Akarendrawarman after he ascended as the successor of Adityawarman.

Pagaruyung VII inscription is currently stored together with some other inscription by Adityawarman in Adityawarman Inscription Complex, also located in Gudam, Pagaruyung, Tanah Datar, West Sumatra.

== Background ==
Pagaruyung VII inscription, also known as Gudam II inscription, is one of inscriptions found in Gudam Jorong (hamlet), Pagaruyung Nagari, Tanjung Emas, Tanah Datar, West Sumatra. This inscription was reported by epigraphist and archaeologist N. J. Krom in Oudheidkundig Verslag (Archeological Report) published by Bataviaasch Genootschap van Kusten en Wetenschappen (Royal Batavian Society of Arts and Sciences) in 1912. This archeological inventory report mostly provided by Louis Constant Westenenk, the Dutch Assistant Resident tasked in Fort de Kock (now Bukittinggi).

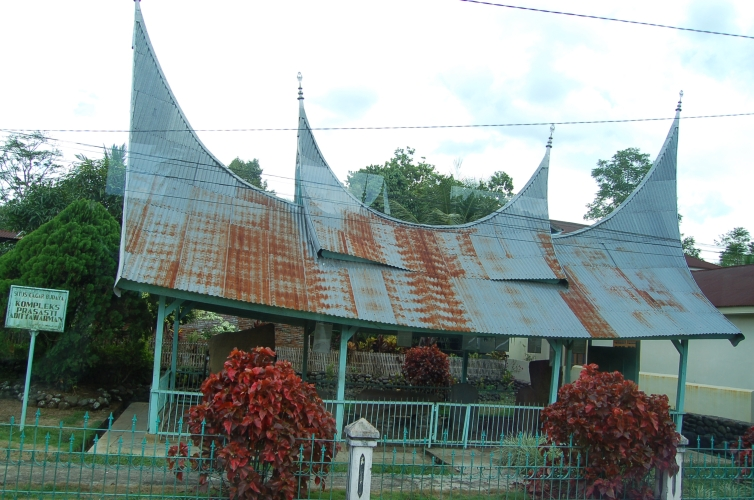
Adityawarman's inscription complex

This inscription estimated to be issued by Akarendrawarman around the 14th century AD. This inscription mention Sri Akarendrawarman as maharajadhiraja and also mention other position, such as tuhan parpatih named Tudang and tuhan gha named Śrī Ratha, both of which are obedient and loyal servant of the king.

This inscription is now stored with other inscriptions in Adityawarman Inscription Complex in Pagaruyung, West Sumatra, with inventory number of 26/BCB-TB/SMB. This inscription has been recognized National Cultural Heritage, through Letter of Decision Number 77/M/2019, published on March 12, 2019 by Ministry of Education and Culture of Republic of Indonesia.

== Physical description ==
This inscription was made in a gray, andesite rock, that has a rectangle shape. This rock is broken in upper left side that broke until middle side of the writings, which remove some of the words. This inscription consists of 16 lines carved in andesite rock, with a size of 10 by 50 by 82 centimetres (3.9 in × 19.7 in × 32.3 in).

Suhadi (1990), de Casparis (1996), Griffith (2012) argued that this inscription was written in Old Malay language; while Kusumadewi (2012) argued that it was written in Sanskrit, Old Malay, and Old Javanese languages, with a post-Pallava script. Istiawan (2006) argued that this inscription was written in Old Javanese with old Javanese script, that shows that Sanskrit and Malay influence is decreasing over time in the government of Adityawarman.

== Content ==
The following is a translation and translation of the original text of the Pagaruyung VII inscription into the Latin alphabet according to the readings of several experts. These are generally presented based on the IAST (International Alphabet of Sanskrit Transliteration) standard.

=== Transliteration ===
Transliteration of the Pagaruyung VII Inscription
| Boechari | de Casparis (1989) | Kusumadewi (2012) | Utomo & Sudarman (2018) |
|---|---|---|---|
| 1. ... ddha raja pra ...; 2. ... purnarapi yawat madana pra ...; 3. ... rajadhiraja srimat sri akarendra(wa); 4. ... rmma maharajadhiraja lagi tida bata(ng?)...; 5. ... na batanna mwah banwa trampa tpuk da ...; 6. ... naga ri pramuta(ka?) tuhannacpi ...; 7. ... mangaban tuhan parpatih sa...y 8. ... muliha tida ba...nta tan su ...; 9. ... tunpa ri ba...ra kani ...; 10. ... hanni pahayangani ta madama/na?; 11. ... tuha ...ma...punarapi yang mangmang...; 12. ... satyah haduta sri maharajadhi ...; 13. ... raja tuhani gha sri rata sri...; 14. ... mahu datu hananning...; 15. ... tuhan parpatih tudang, mamang mamamwa...; 16. ... sumpah sunda hanut waya ... | 1. ----; 2. purnarapi yawat= paduka sri maha 3. (r)ajadhira srimat=sri akarendra(wa)-; 4. rmma maharajadhiraja lagi tida bara-...; 5. ---ta bartanna mwah brampat=suku d.-; 6. ----nagari pramukha tuhann=aryya 7. ----unganan tuhan=parpatih sa(su?); 8. ------lagi tida bu-------su 9. twyata.......kumpati 10. ------han=di parhyangan=di kota ma 11. ------ung mahameru punarapi yang mambawa 12. dhatya paduta sri maharajadhi-; 13. raja tuhann=aryya parakra(ma); 14. makuda (ta) tuhan=mantri het.; 15. sumpah saglan 16. wi tuhan=nampu dharmma so 17. rekha | 1. .... ddha rāja pra ...; 2. punarapi yawat pādu ...; 3. (r)ājādhirāja śrīmat Śrī akarendra 4. rmma mahārājādhirāja lāgi tida bara..; 5. ..ta bartaṅna pwaḥ ṅntha brampat suku d..; 6. ....nagari pramukha tuhann=aryya 7. ...uṅgaṅan tuhan = parpatīh sa(su?); 8. ....lagi tida bu...su...; 9. twyata....kumpati di......; 10. ...han=diparhyaṅan=dikota ma..; 11. ...uang mahāmeru punarapi yaŋ mambawa 12. dhatya pāduka śrī mahārājādhi 13. rāja tuhann=aryya...parakra[ma]; 14. makuda(ta) tuhan.. ni het..; 15. tuhan parpatiḥ tudaŋ maḥ..; 16. sumpah saglan ... śrī....; 17. wi tuhan=nampu...; 18. ...rekha | 1. ddha rājā pra…; 2. punarapi yā wat ha dan .. pra…; 3. {rā}ādhirājā śrimat sri akārendra[wa]…; 4. rmma mahārā..dhirāja lāgi tida bata…; 5. na batanna mwah banwa trampatpuk da…; 6. ... naga ri pramuta tuhannā pr…; 7. ... mangaban tuhan-parpātih sa...; 8. ... muliha tida ba...nta tan su ...; 9. ... tumpa ri ba ... ra kani ...; 10. ... hanni pahyanani ta mādamā 11. ... tuhā ..ma .. punarapu yan man man ...; 12. ... satyahaduta śrimahārājādhi …; 13. ... raja tuharani gha śrirata śri 14. ... madu dātu hanannin …; 15. ... tuhanparpātih tudan, maman mamamwa 16. ... sumpah saṇdha saṇda lanut waya |

=== Translation ===
Translation of Pagaruyung Inscription VII
| Istiawan (2006) based on Boechari’s transliteration | Kusumadewi (2012) |
|---|---|
| 1. … king 2. … who always performs great deeds 3. … (is) King of all kings, the noble Sri Akarendrawarman; 4. … ruler of kings who were formerly subdued and defeated …; 5. … with a bamboo boat 6. … who is in front (primarily is) lord (leader); 7. … who gives signals? is Lord Parpatih (title of office); 8. … pulled back to return 9. … arranged at …; 10. … (who always) holds meetings with affection …; 11. … elder … who swears 12. … loyal to become envoy of Sri Maharajadhi …; 13. … king (namely) lord Gha Sri Rata (world) Sri …; 14. … datu (ratu) who resides at …; 15. … lord parpatih (named) Tudang, swears if …; 16. … sworn (when leaning on a tree by the river) will be killed (seized) by a crocodile | 1. ……. king…………; 2. … who always performs great deeds 3. … (is)… King of all kings, the noble Śri Akarendrawarmman; 4. … ruler of kings who were formerly subdued and defeated….; 5. …. with a bamboo boat….; 6. … who is in front (primarily is) lord (leader); 7. …. who gives signals is Lord Parpatih (title of office); 8. … pulled back to return….; 9. arranged at…; 10. .. (who always) holds meetings with affection…; 11. … elder.. who swears 12. … loyal to become envoy of Śrī Mahārājādhi…; 13. .. king (namely) lord Gha Sri Rata (world) Sri…..; 14. … datu (ratu) who resides at…; 15. .. Lord Parpatih (named) Tudang, swears if…; 16. … sworn (when leaning on a tree by the river) will be killed (seized) by a crocodile… |

== Interpretation ==
=== J.G. de Casparis (1989) ===
According to de Casparis, this inscription was issued by King Akarendrawarman, who ruled before Adityawarman, around the early 14th century. The inscription tells the journey of the king who was accompanied by his dignitaries, such as Tuhan Arya, Mantri, and Tuhan (Lord) Parpatih.

The content of the inscription also mentions the term parhyangan, which is thought to be the same as Pariangan Nagari today, about 10 km from the city of Batusangkar. It also mentions the term berampat suku (clans of four), a well-known term in Minangkabau customs referring to the old customary territory consisting of four original clans (Minangkabau: suku), namely Bodi, Chaniago, Koto, and Piliang.

De Casparis argued that this inscription is related to the relocation of the kingdom’s capital from Jambi to West Sumatra, before the beginning of Adityawarman’s reign. The relocation was carried out by Akarendrawarman around the year 1347 AD; this is based on the date written on the Amoghapasa inscription (on the back of the statue) and Pagaruyung III inscription (also called Kapalo Bukit Gombak I inscription).

=== Machi Suhadi (1990) ===
Suhadi stated that the inscription was already worn and the writing blurred when first read, so de Casparis could only read 75% of the existing text. (Note: In his paper, Suhadi referred to this inscription as "Pagaruyung II". However, based on the characteristics he described, what was meant is the Pagaruyung VII inscription.) In this inscription the name of King Srimat Sri Akarendrawarman is mentioned, as well as the title sri maharajadhiraja which is mentioned three times.

Suhadi argued that this inscription tells of Akarendrawarman conducting an inspection, asking the name of a place, and finally choosing a place as nagari pramuka. It also mentions villages (parhyaŋan), Mount Mahameru, and a patih named Lord Parpatih.

=== Budi Istiawan (2006) ===
Istiawan considered de Casparis’s interpretation to be rather controversial. According to him, since the dating of this inscription cannot be known with certainty, its content also cannot be fully understood. Furthermore, he stated that the oath or curse at the end of the inscription was directed at those who disturbed or disregarded the king’s decree.

Istiawan argued that the use of the name -warmman indicates a kinship relationship between Akarendrawarmman and Adityawarman. He estimated that Akarendrawarman had been appointed king with the title Maharajadhiraja when issuing the inscription, which possibly occurred after Adityawarman abdicated or died.

He also interpreted the offices of lord parpatih and lord gha as loyal assistants to the king. He equated the office of lord with a leader ("juru") in a work group, and patih with a village official ("rama" or village elder). The term Lord Patih then changed to Lord Parpatih, adapting to the local Minangkabau dialect. He noted similarities between Lord Parpatih Tudang in this inscription and the Minangkabau legendary traditional leader Datuk Parpatih nan Sabatang, although he could not yet conclude a direct relationship between them. As for the office of Lord Gha, it has not yet been further identified. (Note: Istiawan stated that Old Javanese inscriptions from the 9th to 13th centuries often mention this office of lord, for example Lord ni Kanayakan, Lord ni Lampuran, Lord Parujar, and so on, who served as village officials. Meanwhile, in the Majapahit era, the position of "patih" later rose to become a close assistant to the king.)

=== Arlo Griffiths (2012) ===
Griffiths commented on earlier research conducted by de Casparis (1995), who was not successful in reading the text bira on lines 13 and 14 of this inscription. Unlike de Casparis, who concluded that Akarendrawarman was the mamak (Note: Mamak is the maternal uncle in Minangkabau language.) of Adityawarman, in accordance with the matrilineal lineage prevailing in Minangkabau; Griffiths argued that this inscription was issued by Akarendrawarman as the successor of Adityawarman.

He considered that the term biraparākramakuda refers to a person’s name. He observed a variation in the pronunciation of the word kuda that differs from the Old Javanese version (kuḍa), and suspected that this difference arose because the Javanese pronunciation differed from the Old Malay version (such as vira and bira).

Furthermore, Griffiths connected Biraparākramakuda in this inscription with Tumaṅguṅ Kuḍa Vīra mentioned in Pagaruyung VI inscription. Griffiths also suspected that this figure might be related to Rakryān Damuṅ Pu Vīra mentioned on the pedestal of the Amoghapasa statue (Padang Roco inscription, 1286 CE), a delegate of the Pamalayu expedition who came from Java to Sumatra (from bhūmi jāva ka svarṇnabhūmi). He argued that the use of Old Javanese in Sumatra was due to direct immigration of Javanese people, or the influence of descendants of Javanese officials serving in Sumatra, such as Rakryān Damuṅ Pu Vīra.

== See also ==
- Dharmasraya
- History of Indian influence on Southeast Asia
- Melayu Kingdom
