= Inlands Bestuur =

Inlands Bestuur or Inlandsch Bestuur (Indonesian: pemerintahan pribumi or pangreh praja) was one of the two forms of government bureaucracy in the Dutch East Indies, in addition to Binnenlands Bestuur.

Inlands Bestuur is the executor of the Dutch Colonial administration in the regions (bureaucracy in the territory of the inlanders or "natives") and can also be a collaboration between the central government and the local government.

For areas on the island of Java (except Batavia, there are also areas known as Vorstenlanden, or "royal lands", namely the Surakarta Sultanate and Yogyakarta Sultanate areas) and the island of Madura divided into several residency areas consisting of several (regentschappen) or "regencies"; and regional heads of regentschap bear the title of "Bupati" or Regent. The Bupati usually come from and are appointed from among families close to the center of power of the Bumiputra.

== See also ==
- Dutch East Indies
- Afdeling
