= Great Dayak =

1946–1950 Dutch client state then autonomous region of Indonesia

Great Dayak Grote Dajak Dayak Besar
- State-level autonomous region of Indonesia
- 1946–1950 (Self-governing entity until 27 December 1949)
- Flag

- History
  - Established: 7 December 1946
  - Disestablished: 18 April 1950
Preceded by	Succeeded by
Dutch East Indies	Central Kalimantan

Great Dayak or Greater Dayak (Indonesian: Dayak Besar, in EVO Dajak Besar; Dutch: Grote Dajak) was a component entity of the United States of Indonesia in Dayak regions on the island of Borneo. It was established on 7 December 1946 with a temporary capital at Bandjermasin (Banjarmasin). Great Dayak was dissolved on 18 April 1950 and became part of Kalimantan Province which was formed on 14 August 1950 with its capital also at Banjarmasin. Following the division of Kalimantan Province, the former territory of Great Dayak was assigned first to South Kalimantan in 1956 and then Central Kalimantan in 1957 where it remains today.

== Person of interests ==
- Helmuth Kunum
