= Seruyan River =

Pembuang River Sungai Seruyan, Soengai Saroejan, Soengai Pemboeang, Soengai Seroejan
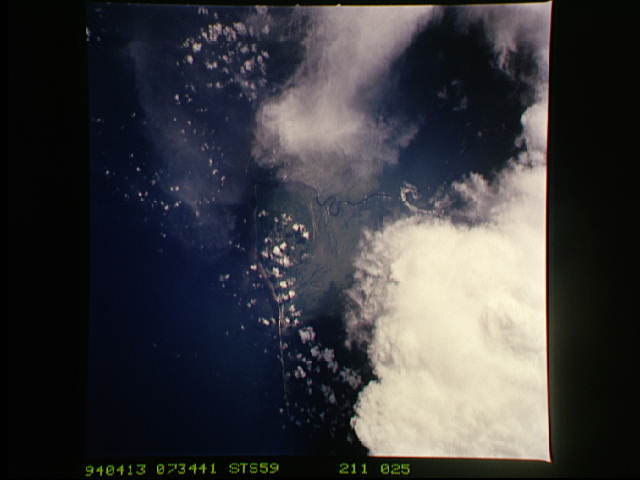
- Pembuang River mouth

- Location within Indonesia
- Native name: Sungai Pembuang (Indonesian)

Location
- Country: Indonesia
- Province: Central Kalimantan

Physical characteristics
- Source
  - location: Bikit Tikung, Schwaner Mountain Range
- Mouth
  - location: Java Sea
  - coordinates: 3°22′40.87″S 112°32′25.86″E
- Length: 350 km (220 mi)
- Basin size: 12,911 km^{2} (4,985 mi^{2})
- Discharge
  - location: Java Sea (near mouth)
  - average: 1,216 m^{3}/s (42,900 cu ft/s)
- Discharge
  - location: Pembuang (Basin size: 7,554 km^{2} (2,917 sq mi)
  - average: 723 m^{3}/s (25,500 cu ft/s)

Pembuang River in Kalimantan

Pembuang River or Seruyan River is a river of Borneo, Indonesia. The river has its source near Bikit Tikung (1,175 metres) in the Schwaner Mountain Range. The eastern side of the river contains dense forest down to Sembulu (Belajau) lakes and is said to be a major habitat of the orangutan. Pembuang means "place of rejection".

== Geography ==
The river flows in the middle to the south of Borneo island with predominantly tropical rainforest climate (designated as Af in the Köppen-Geiger climate classification). The annual average temperature in the area is 24 °C. The warmest month is November, when the average temperature is around 26 °C, and the coldest is February, at 23 °C. The average annual rainfall is 3118 (2971-3480) mm. The wettest month is December, with an average of 491 mm rainfall, and the driest is September, with 67 mm rainfall.

== Hydrology ==
The Seruyan River (previously named Seroejan) is a river that crosses and flows in the Seruyan Regency, Central Kalimantan province, Indonesia. The river flows from north to south and empties into the Java Sea has a length of 350 Km and a navigable 300 Km through several cities, an average depth of 6 m and an average width of 300 m.

A number of its tributaries:

• Sembuluh Lake River

• Salau River

• Pukun River

• Kalua River

• Lanan River

• Bai River

== See also ==
- List of drainage basins of Indonesia
- List of rivers of Indonesia
- List of rivers of Kalimantan
