= Mayor of Makassar =

- Wali Kota Makassar
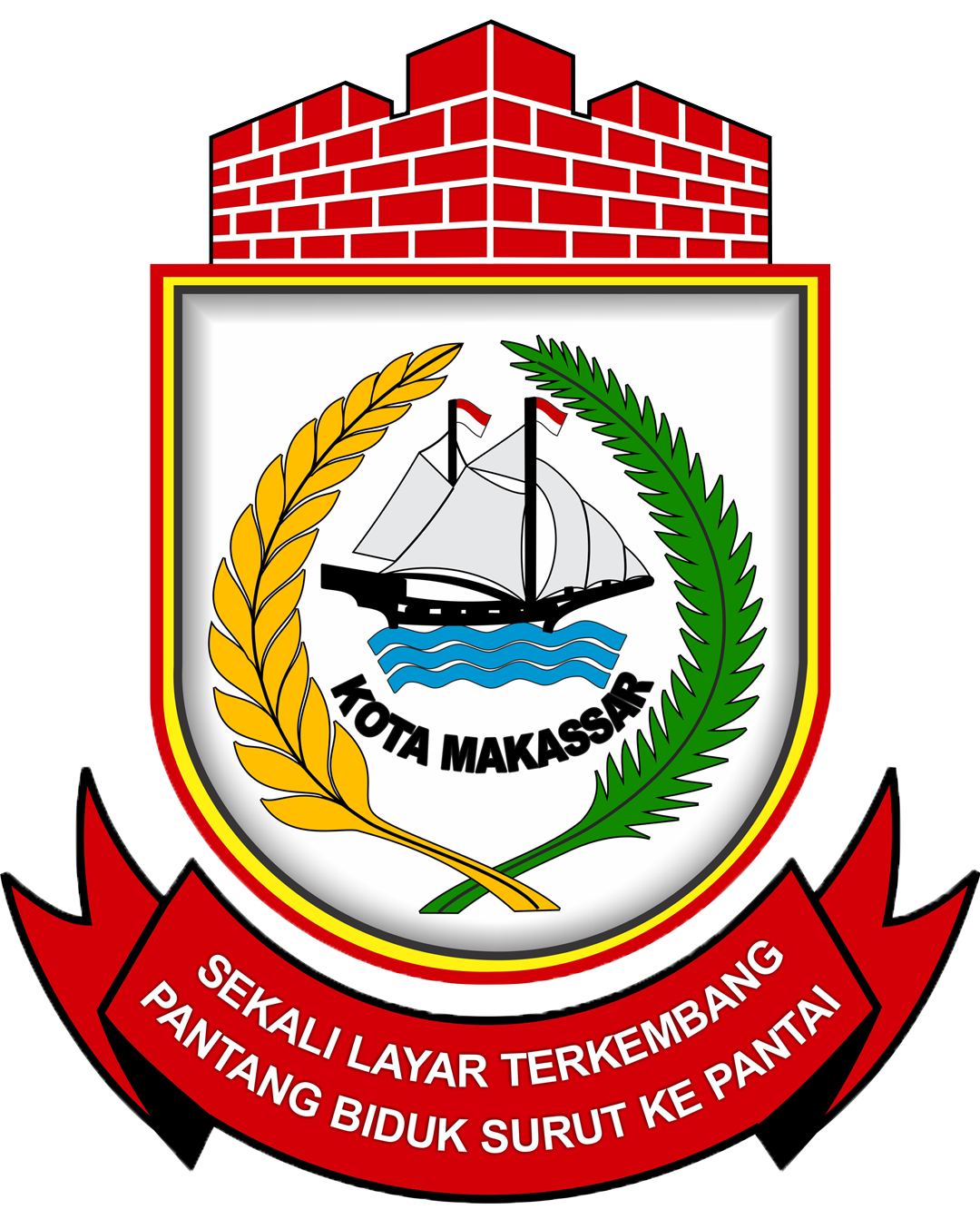
- Coat of arms of Makassar

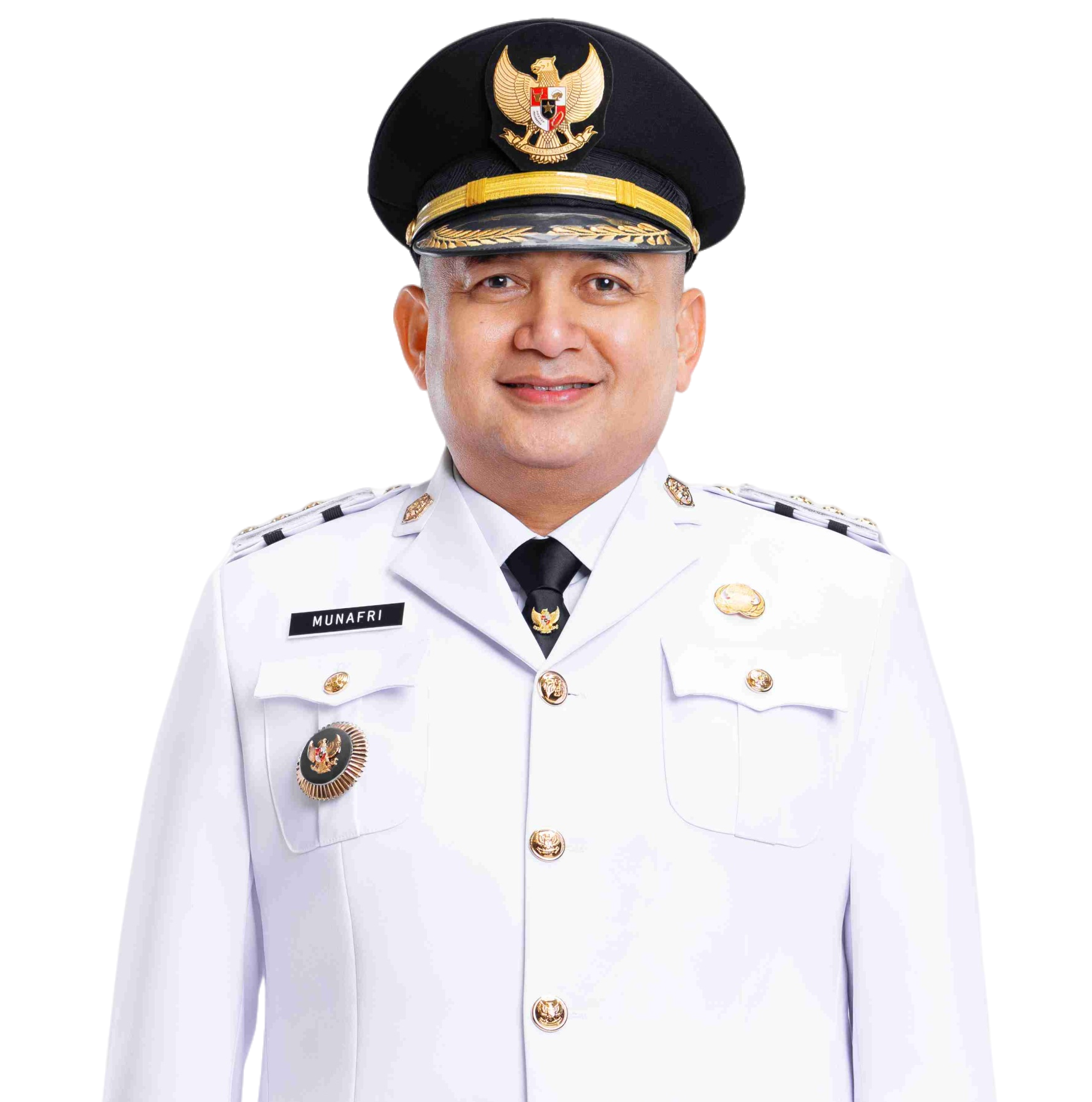
- Incumbent; Munafri Arifuddin since 20 February 2025
- Term length: 5 years
- Inaugural holder: J. E. Dambrink (Dutch East Indies, 1918); Nadjamuddin (Indonesia, 1945)
- Formation: August 15, 1918; 108 years ago
- Website: Official website

Makassar, the capital of South Sulawesi province, has a leadership structure that begins with the mayor. In 1918, the position of assistant resident, who previously led the Makassar government, was finally changed to mayor. The first mayor was J.E. Dambrink, a man of Dutch descent. Initially, a mayor could also serve as chairman of the city council, assisted by an assistant mayor elected by popular vote.

== List ==
The following is a definitive list of Mayors of Makassar since 1918 during the Dutch East Indies era until now under the Government of the Republic of Indonesia.

Burgemeester van Makassar
Num.	Mayor (Birth–Death)	Portrait	Party	Beginning	End	Term of office	Period	Vice Mayor	Ref.
1	J. E. Dambrink (1872–1929)		Non Party	15 August 1918	April 1927	8–9 years	1 (1918)	J. Rutgers (1921–unknown)	
2	J. H. de Groot (1886–1960)		Non Party	April 1927	1931	3–4 years	2 (1927)	D. Eskes (1927–1929)	
3	G. H. J. Berckenkamp (1887–1975)		Non Party	1931	1932	0–1 years	3 (1931)		
4	F. C. van Lier (1882–1933)		Non Party	1932	28 January 1933	0–1 years	4 (1932)		(Note: Died in office)
5	Ch. H. ter Laag (1890–1973)		Non Party	1933	1934	0–1 years	5 (1933)		
6	J. Leewis (1880–1944)		Non Party	1934	1936	1–2 years	6 (1934)		
7	H. F. Brune (1894–1974)		Non Party	1936	1942	5–6 years	7 (1936)	N. H. Leepel (1936–1938)	
マカッサル市長
Num.	Mayor (Birth–Death)	Portrait	Party	Beginning	End	Term of office	Period	Vice Mayor	Ref.
1	B. Yamasaki		Non Party	1942	1945	2–3 years	8	There isn't any	
Mayor of Makassar
Num.	Mayor (Birth–Death)	Portrait	Party	Beginning	End	Term of office	Period	Vice Mayor	Ref.
1	Nadjamuddin (1907–1950)		Parindra	17 August 1945	11 September 1945	25 days	9	Jusuf Samah	
2	D. M. van Zwieten (1900–1975)		Non Party	1945	24 December 1946	0–1 years	10	There isn't any	
3	Abdul Hamid		Masyumi	24 December 1946	27 December 1949	3 years, 3 days	11		
4	Salawati Daud (1909–1985)		PKI	27 December 1949	17 August 1950	233 days	12		
5	J. M. Qaimuddin		Independent	1950	1951	0–1 years	13		
6	J. Mewengkang		Independent	1951	1951	0 years	14		
7	Sampara Daeng Lili		Independent	1951	1952	0–1 years	15		
8	Achmad Dara Syachruddin (1920–2014)		Independent	1952	1957	4–5 years	16		
9	Mohammad Junus Daeng Mile		Independent	1957	1958	0–1 years	17		
10	Abdul Latif Daeng Masikki		ABRI–AD	1958	6 February 1960	1–2 years	18		
11	Aroeppala (1910–1999)		PSII	6 February 1960	7 May 1965	5 years, 91 days	19 (1960)		
12	Muhammad Daeng Patompo (1926–unknown)		ABRI–AD	8 May 1965	1968	2–3 years	20 (1965)		
12	Muhammad Daeng Patompo (1926–unknown)		ABRI–AD	1968	1973	4–5 years	21 (1968)		
12	Muhammad Daeng Patompo (1926–unknown)		ABRI–AD	1973	1978	4–5 years	22 (1973)		
13	Abustam		ABRI–AD	1978	1983	4–5 years	23 (1978)		
14	Jancy Raib		ABRI–AD	1983	1988	4–5 years	24 (1983)		
15	Suwahyo		ABRI–AD	1988	1993	4–5 years	25 (1988)		
16	Malik Baso Masry (1949–2021)		Non Party	1994	1999	4–5 years	26 (1994)		
17	Amiruddin Maula (1952–2015)		Non Party	8 May 1999	8 May 2004	5 years, 0 days	27 (1999)	Sjamsu Ridjal (1999–2004)	
18	Ilham Arief Sirajuddin (born 1965)		Golkar	8 May 2004	8 August 2008	5 years, 0 days	28 (2003)	Herry Iskandar (2004–2008)	
19	Herry Iskandar (born 1958)		Non Party	8 August 2008	8 May 2009	273 days	28 (2003)	Vacant	
(18)	Ilham Arief Sirajuddin (born 1965)		Demokrat	8 May 2009	8 May 2014	5 years, 0 days	29 (2008)	Supomo Guntur (2009–2014)	
20	Mohammad Ramdhan Pomanto (born 1964)		Independent (until 2018)	8 May 2014	8 May 2019	5 years, 0 days	30 (2013)	Syamsu Rizal (2014–2019)	
20	Mohammad Ramdhan Pomanto (born 1964)		Nasdem (2018–2023)	8 May 2014	8 May 2019	5 years, 0 days	30 (2013)	Syamsu Rizal (2014–2019)	
20	Mohammad Ramdhan Pomanto (born 1964)		Nasdem (2018–2023)	26 February 2021	20 February 2025	3 years, 360 days	31 (2020)	Fatmawati Rusdi (2021–2023)	
20	Mohammad Ramdhan Pomanto (born 1964)		PDI-P (since 2023)	26 February 2021	20 February 2025	3 years, 360 days	31 (2020)	Fatmawati Rusdi (2021–2023)	
21	Munafri Arifuddin (born 1975)		Golkar	20 February 2025	Incumbent	1 year, 267 days	32 (2024)	Aliyah Mustika Ilham (2025–now)	

== Temporary replacement ==
In the government stack, a regional head who submits himself to leave or temporarily resigns from his position to the central government, then the Minister of Home Affairs prepares a replacement who is a bureaucrat in the regional government or even a vice mayor, including when the mayor's position is in a transition period.

Portrait	Mayor	Party	Beginning	End	Duration	Period	Definitive	Ref.
	H. F. Brune (1894–1974) (ad interim)	Non Party	11 September 1945	1945	0 years	9 (1945)	Nadjamuddin	
	Muhammad Ghalib (1946–2016) (Acting)	ABRI–AD	1993	1994	0–1 years	—	Transition (1993–1994)	
	Alwy Rum (1944–2021) (Action Officer)	Non Party	1999	8 May 1999	0 years	—	Transition (1999)	
	Syamsu Rizal (born 1973) (Action Officer)	Non Party	15 February 2018	23 June 2018	128 days	30 (2013)	Mohammad Ramdhan Pomanto	(Note: Mohammad Ramdhan Pomanto took campaign leave for the 2018 Makassar mayoral election, but on 21 March 2018 was disqualified.) (Note: Vice mayor Syamsu Rizal fills the position of Mohammad Ramdhan Pomanto who is on campaign leave.)
	Muhammad Anshar (born 1963) (Daily Executive)	Non Party	8 May 2019	13 May 2019	5 days	—	Transition (2019–2021)	(Note: The definitive Mayor's term has been completed, however, because there was no winner in the 2018 Makassar mayoral election, the Mayor's position was temporarily filled by ASN as Daily Executive and Acting.)
	Muhammad Iqbal Samad Suhaeb (born 1966) (Acting)	Non Party	13 May 2019	13 May 2020	1 year, 0 days	—	Transition (2019–2021)	
	Yusran Jusuf (born 1969) (Acting)	Non Party	13 May 2020	26 June 2020	44 days	—	Transition (2019–2021)	
	Rudy Djamaluddin (born 1970) (Acting)	Non Party	26 June 2020	26 February 2021	245 days	—	Transition (2019–2021)	
	Andi Arwien Azis (born 1976) (Acting)	Non Party	24 September 2024	23 November 2024	60 days	31 (2020)	Mohammad Ramdhan Pomanto	(Note: Mohammad Ramdhan Pomanto is on campaign leave for the 2024 South Sulawesi gubernatorial election from 25 September 2024 to 23 November 2024.)

== See also ==
- Makassar
- List of incumbent regional heads and deputy regional heads in South Sulawesi
