= 2013 Makassar mayoral election =

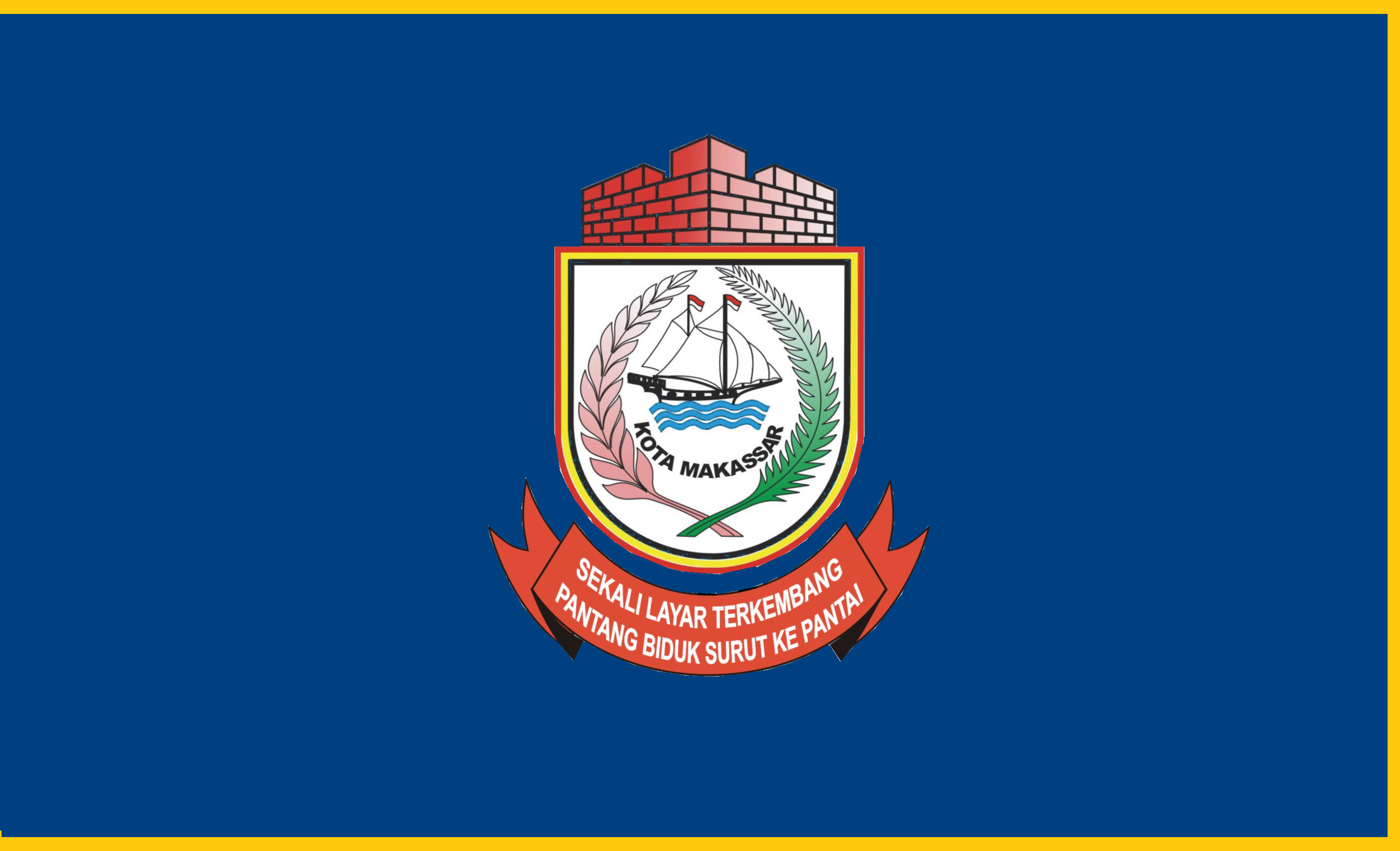
← 2008	18 September 2013	2018 →
- Turnout: 59.49%
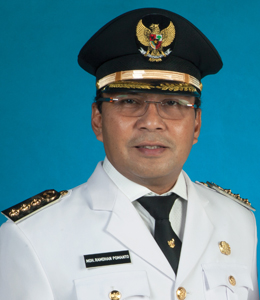

Candidate	Danny Pomanto	Irman Yasin Limpo	Tamsil Linrung
Party	Demokrat	PAN	PKS
Running mate	Syamsu Rizal	Busrah Abdullah	Das'ad Latief
Popular vote	182,424	114,032	93,868
Percentage	31.17%	19.48%	16.04%
Mayor before election
Ilham Arief Sirajuddin
Demokrat
Elected mayor
Danny Pomanto
Demokrat

A mayoral election was held in the city of Makassar on 23 September 2013. The election was the second direct mayoral election in the city's history.

10 pairs contested the elections, including 4 independent tickets. With the incumbent barred from reelection after 2 terms, nearly 600,000 of the city's residents voted in the elections. Demokrat-backed architect Mohammad Ramdhan Pomanto secured a victory with a plurality of the votes.

== Background ==
Makassar's first direct mayoral election was held in 2008, with incumbent Ilham Arief Sirajuddin winning his second term. The city's province, South Sulawesi, has been described by national and international observers alike as being rife with dynastic politics.

Initially, the election was planned for February 2014, but it was moved to 2013 in order to prevent interference with the national legislative and presidential elections. There were 983,900 eligible voters.

== Candidates ==
Ballot number	Candidate	Running mate	Supporting parties
1	Adil Patu	Isradi Zaenal	Gerindra; PDK
2	Supomo Guntur	Kadir Halid	PDI-P; Golkar
3	Rusdin Abdullah	M Idris Patarai	Independent
4	Herman Handoko	Abd Latif Bafadhal	Independent
5	Erwin Kallo	Hasbi Ali	Independent
6	Tamsil Linrung	Das'ad Latif	PKS; Hanura; PBR
7	Sitti Muhyina	M Syaiful Shaleh	Independent
8	Mohammad Ramdhan Pomanto	Syamsu Rizal	Demokrat; PBB
9	Irman Yasin Limpo	Busrah Abdullah	Independent
10	Apiati K Amin Syam	Zulkifli Gani Otto	21 non-DPR parties

== Results ==
No	Candidate - Running mate	Votes	%
1	Adil-Isradi	14,556	2.49
2	Supomo-Kadir	84,153	14.38
3	Rusdin-Pattarai	23,846	4.07
4	Herman-Latif	2,930	0.50
5	Erwin-Hasbi	5,489	0.94
6	Tamsil-Das'ad	93,868	16.04
7	Muhyina-Syaful	56,607	9.67
8	Pomanto-Rizal	182,484	31.18
9	Limpo-Abdullah	114,032	19.48
10	Apiaty-Zulkifli	7,326	1.25
Total votes		585,291	100%
Turnout		59.49%	

7,008 votes out of the 592,299 cast were invalid. During the results announcement, witnesses of the Supomo-Kadir pair walked out, claiming that the election had been a fraudulent one. Candidate pairs with ballot numbers 2, 7 and 9 sued Pomanto-Rizal in the Constitutional Court, but their demands to disqualify the winner and repeat voting were rejected in full.

Pomanto and Rizal were officially sworn in on 8 May 2014.
