= List of incumbent regional heads and deputy regional heads in South Sulawesi =

The following is an article about the list of Regional Heads and Deputy Regional Heads in 24 regencies/cities in South Sulawesi who are currently still serving.

== List ==
Regency/ City	Photo of the Regent/ Mayor	Regent/ Mayor	Photo of Deputy Regent/ Mayor	Deputy Regent/ Mayor	Taking Office	End of Office (Planned)	Ref.
Bantaeng; Regency List of Regents/Deputy Regents		Fathul Fauzy Nurdin		Sahabuddin	20 February 2025	20 February 2030	
Barru; Regency List of Regents/Deputy Regents		Andi Ina Kartika Sari		Abustan Andi Bintang	20 February 2025	20 February 2030	
Barru; Regency List of Regents/Deputy Regents		Andi Asman Sulaiman		Andi Akmal Pasluddin	20 February 2025	20 February 2030	
Bulukumba; Regency List of Regents/Deputy Regents		Andi Muchtar Ali Yusuf		Andi Edy Manaf	20 February 2025	20 February 2030	
Enrekang; Regency List of Regents/Deputy Regents		Muhammad Yusuf Ritangnga		Andi Tenri Liwang La Tinro	20 February 2025	20 February 2030	
Gowa; Regency List of Regents/Deputy Regents		Sitti Husniah Talenrang		Darmawangsyah Muin	20 February 2025	20 February 2030	
Jeneponto; Regency List of Regents/Deputy Regents		Paris Yasir		Muhammad Islam Iskandar	21 March 2025	21 March 2030	
Selayar Islands; Regency List of Regents/Deputy Regents		Muhammad Natsir Ali		Muhtar	20 February 2025	20 February 2030	
Luwu; Regency List of Regents/Deputy Regents		Patahuddin		Muhammad Dhevy Bijak	20 February 2025	20 February 2030	
East Luwu; Regency List of Regents/Deputy Regents		Irwan Bachri Syam		Puspawati Husler	20 February 2025	20 February 2030	
North Luwu; Regency List of Regents/Deputy Regents		Andi Abdullah Rahim		Jumail Mappaile	20 February 2025	20 February 2030	
Maros; Regency List of Regents/Deputy Regents		Andi Syafril Chaidir Syam		Muetazim Mansyur	20 February 2025	20 February 2030	
Pangkajene and Islands; Regency List of Regents/Deputy Regents		Muhammad Yusran Lalogau		Abdul Rahman Assagaf	20 February 2025	20 February 2030	
Pinrang; Regency List of Regents/Deputy Regents		Andi Irwan Hamid		Sudirman Bungi	20 February 2025	20 February 2030	
Sidenreng Rappang; Regency List of Regents/Deputy Regents		Syaharuddin Alrif		Nur Kana'ah	20 February 2025	20 February 2030	
Sinjai; Regency List of Regents/Deputy Regents		Ratnawati Arif		Andi Mahyanto Mazda	20 February 2025	20 February 2030	
Soppeng; Regency List of Regents/Deputy Regents		Suwardi Haseng		Selle K.S Dalle	20 February 2025	20 February 2030	
Takalar; Regency List of Regents/Deputy Regents		Firdaus Daeng Manye		Hengky Yasin	20 February 2025	20 February 2030	
Tana Toraja; Regency List of Regents/Deputy Regents	pus	Zadrak Tombeg	pus	Erianto Laso Paundanan	20 February 2025	20 February 2030	
North Toraja; Regency List of Regents/Deputy Regents	pus	Frederik Victor Palimbong	pus	Andrew Branch Silambi	20 February 2025	20 February 2030	
Wajo; Regency List of Regents/Deputy Regents	pus	Andi Rosman	pus	Baso Rahmanuddin	20 February 2025	20 February 2030	
Makassar; City List of Mayors/Deputy mayors		Munafri Arifuddin		Aliyah Mustika Ilham	20 February 2025	20 February 2030	
Palopo; City List of Mayors/Deputy mayors		Naili Trisal		Akhmad Syarifuddin Daud	4 August 2025	4 August 2030	
Parepare; City List of Mayors/Deputy mayors		Tasming Hamid		Hermanto Pasennang	20 February 2025	20 February 2030	

Notes

- "Commencement of office" is the inauguration date at the beginning or during the current term of office. For acting regents/mayors, it is the date of appointment or extension as acting regent/mayor.
- Based on the Constitutional Court decision Number 27/PUU-XXII/2024, the Governor and Deputy Governor, Regent and Deputy Regent, and Mayor and Deputy Mayor elected in 2020 shall serve until the inauguration of the Governor and Deputy Governor, Regent and Deputy Regent, and Mayor and Deputy Mayor elected in the 2024 national simultaneous elections as long as the term of office does not exceed 5 (five) years.

== See also ==
- South Sulawesi
