= 2024 Makassar mayoral election =

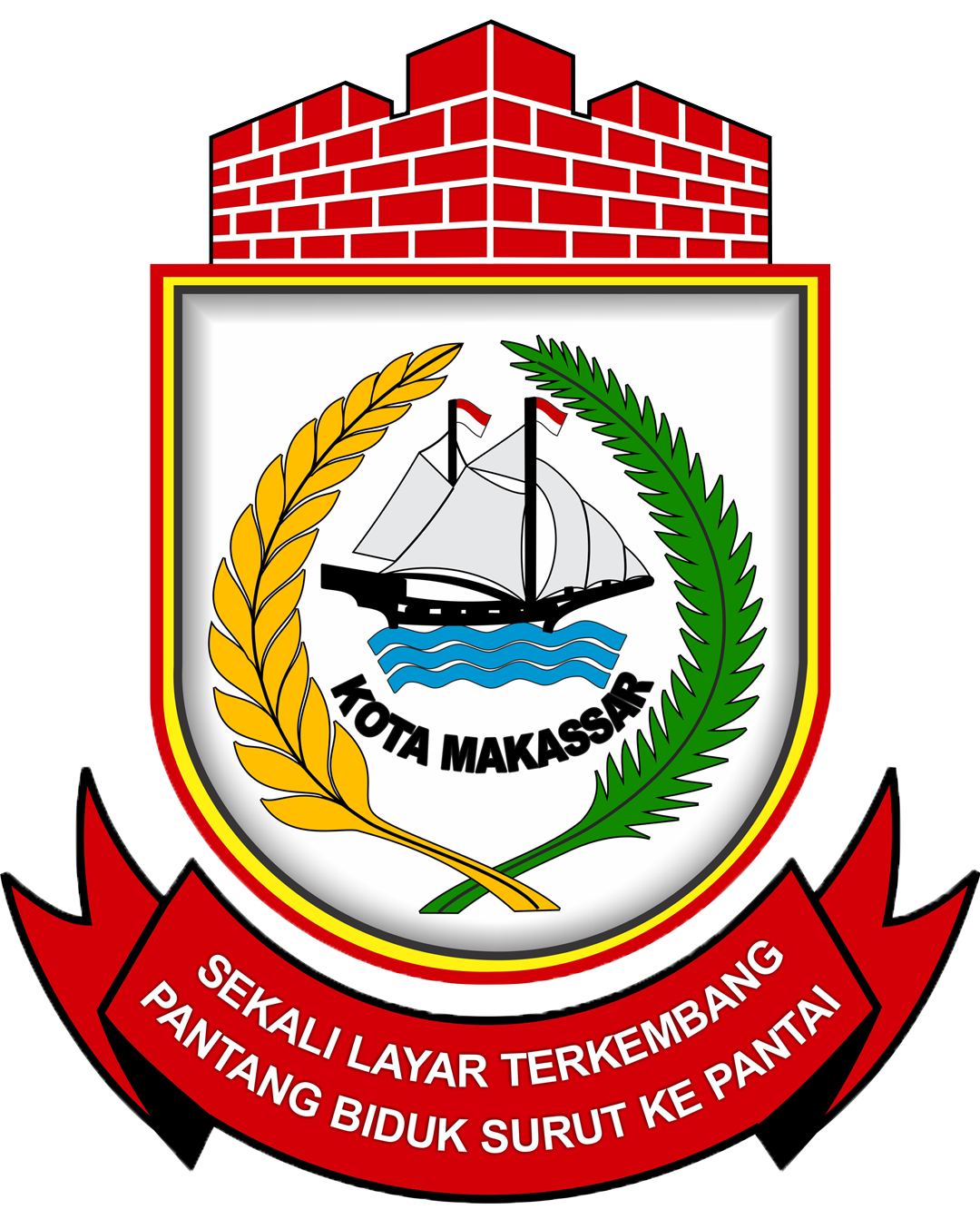
- 27 November 2024
- Turnout: 57.64%
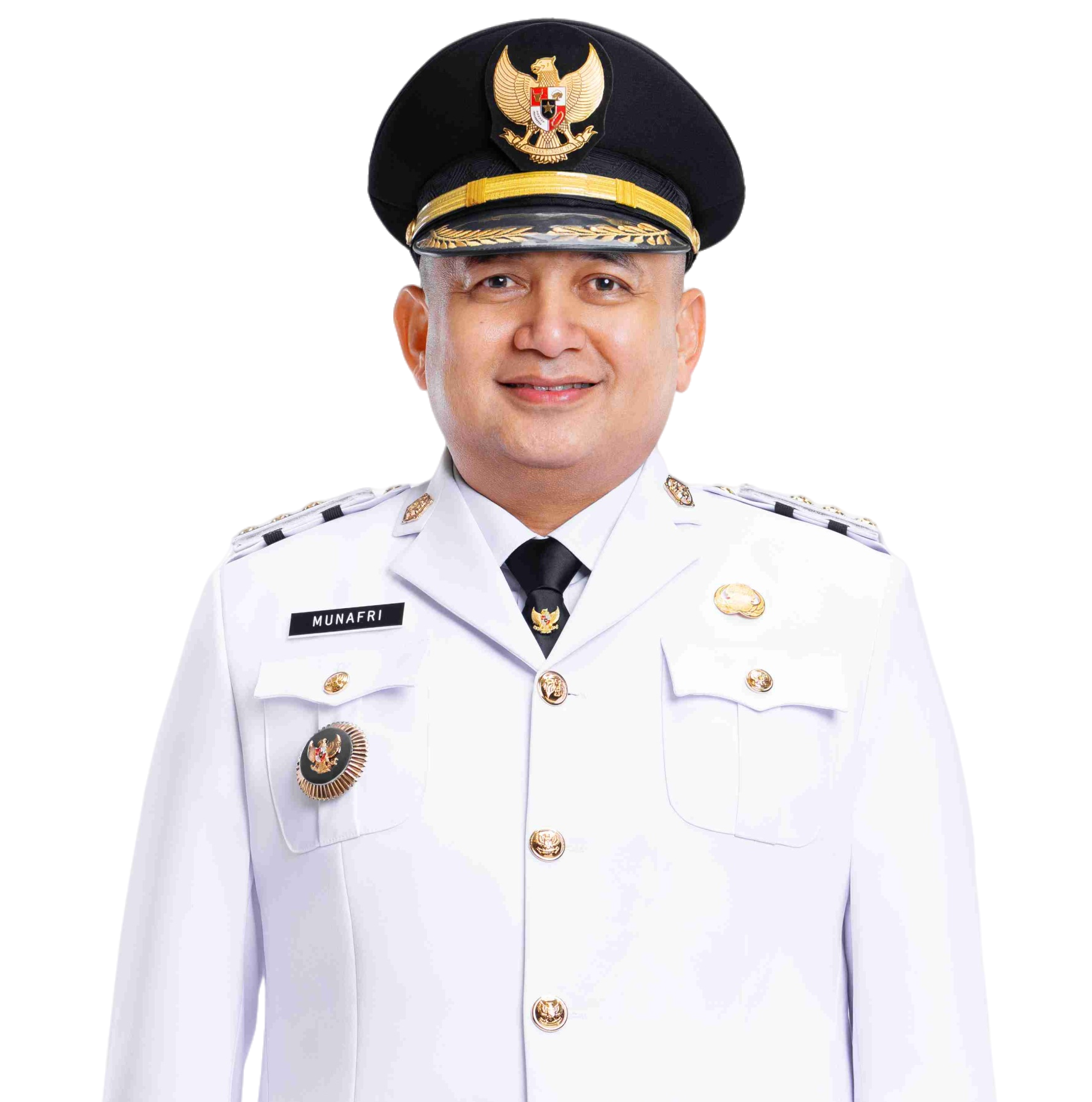

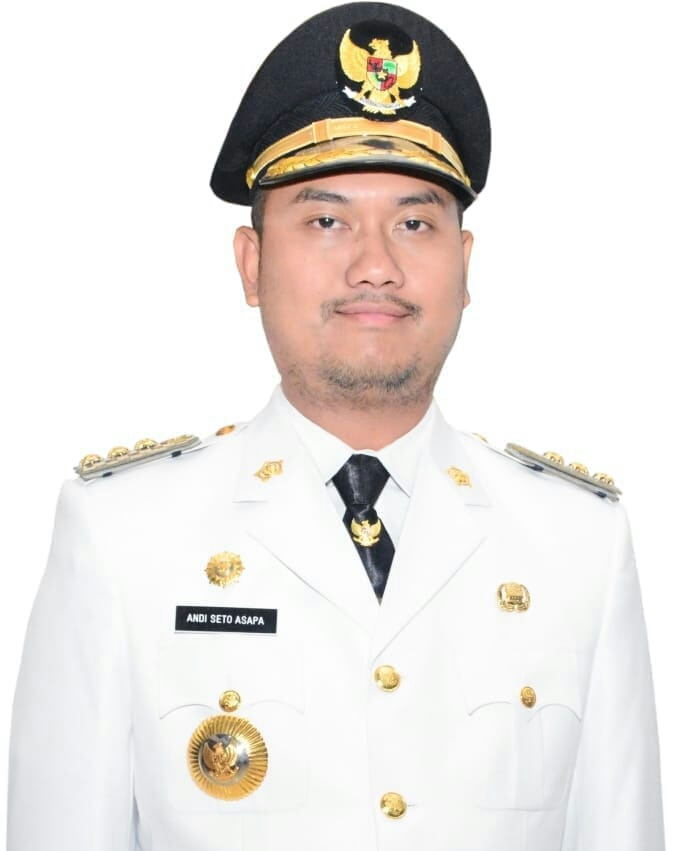

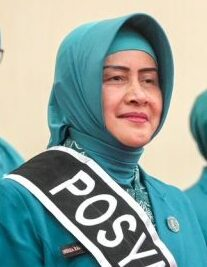
Candidate	Munafri Arifuddin	Andi Seto Gadhista Asapa	Indira Yusuf Ismail
Party	Golkar	Gerindra	PDI-P
Running mate	Aliyah Mustika Ilham	Rezki Mulfiati Lutfi	Ilham Ari Fauzi Uskara
Popular vote	319,112	162,427	81,405
Percentage	54.72%	27.85%	13.96%
- Results by district and subdistrict (Interactive version)
Mayor before election
Mohammad Ramdhan Pomanto
PDI-P
Elected mayor
Munafri Arifuddin
Golkar

The 2024 Makassar mayoral election was held on 27 November 2024 as part of nationwide local elections to elect the mayor and vice mayor of Makassar for a five-year term. The previous election was held in 2020. Munafri Arifuddin of Golkar won the election with 54% of the vote. The Gerindra Party's Andi Seto Gadhista Asapa placed second with 27%, followed by Indira Yusuf Ismail, a member of the Indonesian Democratic Party of Struggle (PDI-P) and wife of outgoing Mayor Mohammad Ramdhan Pomanto, who received 13% of the vote.

== Electoral system ==
The election, like other local elections in 2024, follow the first-past-the-post system where the candidate with the most votes wins the election, even if they do not win a majority. It is possible for a candidate to run uncontested, in which case the candidate is still required to win a majority of votes "against" an "empty box" option. Should the candidate fail to do so, the election will be repeated on a later date.

== Candidates ==
According to electoral regulations, in order to qualify for the election, candidates were required to secure support from a political party or a coalition of parties controlling 10 seats in the Makassar City Regional House of Representatives (DPRD). As no parties received 10 or more seats from the 2024 legislative election, all parties must form coalitions in order to nominate a mayoral candidate. Candidates may alternatively demonstrate support in form of photocopies of identity cards, which in Makassar's case corresponds to 67,402 copies. No such candidates submitted a registration with the General Elections Commission (KPU) before the set deadline.

The previous elected mayor, Mohammad Ramdhan Pomanto, had served for two terms and was ineligible to run in the mayoral election.

=== Potential ===
The following are individuals who have either been publicly mentioned as a potential candidate by a political party in the DPRD, publicly declared their candidacy with press coverage, or considered as a potential candidate by media outlets:

- Fatmawati Rusdi (NasDem), previous vice mayor and former member of the House of Representatives.
- Munafri Arifuddin (Golkar), businessman and mayoral candidate in 2018 and 2020.
- Indira Jusuf, wife of Mohammad Ramdhan Pomanto.
- Rusdin Abdullah (Golkar), businessman and 2013 mayoral candidate.

== Political map ==
Following the 2024 Indonesian general election, eleven political parties are represented in the Makassar DPRD:

Political parties	Seat count
NasDem Party	8 / 50
Party of Functional Groups (Golkar)	6 / 50
Great Indonesia Movement Party (Gerindra)	6 / 50
Prosperous Justice Party (PKS)	6 / 50
Indonesian Democratic Party of Struggle (PDI-P)	5 / 50
National Awakening Party (PKB)	5 / 50
United Development Party (PPP)	5 / 50
Democratic Party (Demokrat)	3 / 50
National Mandate Party (PAN)	3 / 50
People's Conscience Party (Hanura)	2 / 50
Perindo Party	1 / 50

== Results ==
Candidate	Running mate	Party	Votes	%
Munafri Arifuddin	Aliyah Mustika Ilham	Golkar	319,112	54.72
Andi Seto Gadhista Asapa	Rezki Mulfiati Lutfi	Gerindra Party	162,427	27.85
Indira Yusuf Ismail	Ilham Ari Fauzi Uskara	Indonesian Democratic Party of Struggle	81,405	13.96
Muhammad Amri Arsyid	Abdul Rahman Bando	Prosperous Justice Party	20,247	3.47
Total			583,191	100.00
Valid votes			583,191	97.56
Invalid/blank votes			14,603	2.44
Total votes			597,794	100.00
Registered voters/turnout			1,037,164	57.64
Source: detik.com

Candidate vote share by subdistrict
Munafri–Aliyah

Andi Seto–Rezki

Indira–Ilham

Amri–Rahman
