= Okkots =

Okkots or okkot is an idiom typical to people coming from South Sulawesi, especially from ethnic Makassar and Bugis. It is characterized by unintentionally changing some part of a word in Indonesian during a conversation.

== Etymology ==
Okkot(s) is derived from the word okko' in Makassar language which literally means "trespassing a dividing line". This term was first introduced in traditional games played by children in South Sulawesi.

== Characteristics ==
There are various forms of okkots, some of the most generally occurred are removing the letter "g" in a word that ended with "g" and adding "g" in a word that ended with "n".

Examples:

Okkot	Indonesian language	English language
Makang	Makan	Eat
Meman	Memang	Indeed
Cet	Cek	Check
Enapnya makang apa yah, pisan gorem atau ayang?	Enaknya makan apa yah, pisang goreng atau ayam?	Which one should we eat, banana fritters or chicken?

== See also ==
- Indonesian slang
