= 2018 Makassar mayoral election =

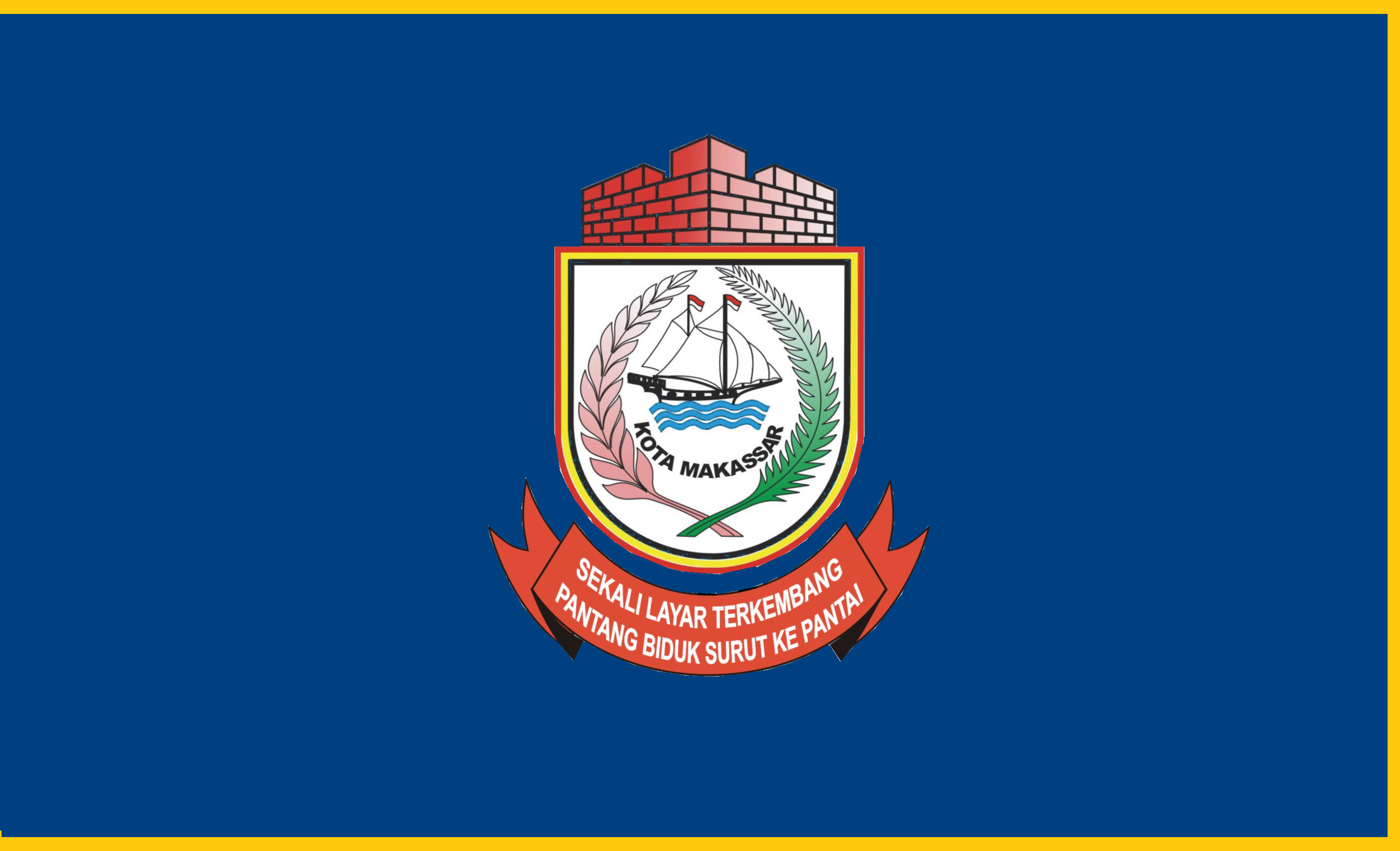
- 27 June 2018
- Turnout: 57.20%

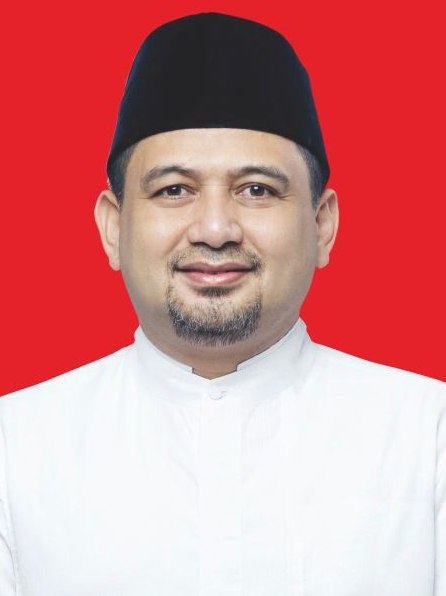
| Candidate | Blank box | Munafri Arifuddin |
| Party | | Golkar |
| Running mate | | Rachmatika Dewi |
| Popular vote | 300,795 | 264,245 |
| Percentage | 53.23% | 46.77% |
Mayor before election
Danny Pomanto
Demokrat
Elected mayor
Position vacant
Iqbal Samad Suhaeb becomes acting mayor

The 2018 Makassar mayoral election took place on 27 June 2018 as part of the simultaneous local elections in Makassar, South Sulawesi, Indonesia. It was held to elect the mayor of Makassar and the deputy mayor.

Munafri Arifuddin, who was supported by 10 from 11 political parties in the city's Regional People's Representative Council, was the only candidate in an uncontested election. Incumbent mayor Mohammad Ramdhan Pomanto initially registered to run for a second term as an independent candidate, but his candidacy was later revoked by a Supreme Court ruling.

Despite running as a single candidate, Arifuddin, who was the CEO of local football club PSM Makassar and nephew of then-Indonesian vice president Jusuf Kalla, lost the vote to an empty ballot (kotak kosong), forcing the election to be repeated in 2020 and for an acting mayor to be appointed by the Ministry of Home Affairs. Although a lawsuit was brought to the Constitutional Court, the appeal was rejected, making the election the first in Indonesian electoral history in which an empty ballot won.

== Timeline ==
The KPU set a temporary voter count at 862,731 in March 2018, spread across 15 subdistricts. The voters voted at 2,765 polling stations. A budget of Rp 60 billion (US$4.35 million) was assigned for the election, of which 16.4 billion came from the 2017 budget and the rest from the 2018 fiscal year. Registration for party-backed candidates was opened between 8 and 10 January 2018, while independent candidates were required to register between 22 and 26 November 2017. The campaign period was from 15 February to 24 June, with a three-day election silence before voting on 27 June. The vote itself follows a first past the post system.

The candidates were assigned their ballot numbers on 13 February 2018.

== Candidates ==
| Ballot number | Candidate | Position | Running mate | Supporting parties |
|---|---|---|---|---|
| 1 | Munafri Arifuddin | CEO of PSM Makassar | Rachmatika Dewi | Nasdem; Golkar; PDI-P; Gerindra; Hanura; PKS; PKB; PPP; PKPI, PBB; Total: 43 seats |

Munafri Arifuddin, a member of Golkar and nephew of the then-Vice President Jusuf Kalla, was supported by 10 parties. Also the CEO of the PSM Makassar football club, he had promised to keep this position if elected. Arifuddin's running mate Rachmatika Dewi was a deputy speaker of the city council and the chief of Nasdem in Makassar.

Although initially supported by some political parties, Mohammad Ramdhan Pomanto registered with the KPU as an independent candidate, having collected 117,492 valid copies of ID cards out of the ~65,000 required as an independent candidate. Demokrat was the only party represented in the People's Representative Council that officially supported him. Other parties declared their initial support to him, but withdrew later. His running mate Indira Mulyasari was the deputy speaker of the city council, although she resigned for the election.

In February, the Munafri-Dewi pair sued the local KPU in order to cancel Pomanto's candidacy, citing a case in which Pomanto distributed smartphones while serving as the city's mayor. The South Sulawesi high court on national administration (Pengadilan Tinggi Tata Usaha Negara) on March 21 ordered the KPU to cancel Pomanto's candidacy. The election body then brought the case to the Supreme Court, which upheld the PT TUN decision. Pomanto stated that he would continue pressing his case through the legal system. However, the electoral commission decided to disqualify him following a closed-door meeting, making the election an uncontested one. However, Arifuddin was still required to win a majority of the votes (voters could vote for an empty ballot) or the elections would be redone in 2020.

== Polling ==
=== After nominations ===
| Pollster | Date | Sample size | Results |
|---|---|---|---|
| Celebes Research Center | 1–14 March 2018 | 1,000 | Mohammad Ramdhan Pomanto (71.8%), Munafri Afiruddin (18.8%) |

== Results ==
=== Quick count ===
| Pollster | Munafri-Dewi | None of the above |
|---|---|---|
| CRC | 46.51 | 53.49 |

=== Official ===
| Votes by district | Munafri-Dewi | | None of the above | |
| Votes by district | Votes | % | Votes | % |
|---|---|---|---|---|
| Tamalate | 33,817 | 50.2 | 33,541 | 49.8 |
| Tamalanrea | 16,912 | 44.45 | 21,138 | 55.55 |
| Ujung Tanah | 7,362 | 46.95 | 8,317 | 53.05 |
| Sangkarrang | 3,261 | 47.22 | 3,645 | 52.78 |
| Manggala | 30,384 | 52.37 | 27,631 | 47.63 |
| Tallo | 26,297 | 47.45 | 29,122 | 52.55 |
| Panakkukang | 25,069 | 44.63 | 31,108 | 55.37 |
| Makassar | 13,654 | 39.31 | 21,081 | 60.69 |
| Biringkanayya | 36,092 | 47.86 | 39,320 | 52.14 |
| Ujung Pandang | 3,822 | 34.31 | 7,319 | 65.69 |
| Mariso | 11,566 | 47.38 | 12,845 | 52.62 |
| Wajo | 4,695 | 37.12 | 7,954 | 62.88 |
| Rappocini | 27,503 | 47.49 | 30,408 | 52.51 |
| Bontoala | 8,598 | 46.16 | 10,029 | 53.84 |
| Mamajang | 10,923 | 44.71 | 13,509 | 55.29 |
| Total | 259,955 | 46.68 | 296,967 | 53.32 |

== Aftermath ==
Following the announcement of the results, the Munafri-Dewi campaign team filed a lawsuit to the Constitutional Court, claiming "structured, systematic and massive cheating", accusing Pomanto of having interfered in favor of the "none of the above option" within his capacity as mayor, and demanding that the "none of the above" option/empty column be cancelled. In 10 August, the court ruled against the appeal, hence awarding "victory" for the none of the above option - the first in Indonesian electoral history.

The repeat election was held in 2020, with Pomanto and Munafri both contesting the election with two other pairs of candidates. Pomanto would win the 2020 election with 41 percent of votes to secure a second term. Munafri would contest the mayoralship again in 2024, and was elected.
