= Amiruddin Maula =

Indonesian politician

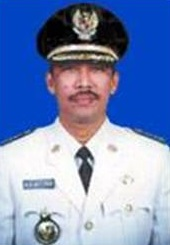

Mayor of Makassar
- In office 1999–2004
- Preceded by: Andi Malik Baso Masry
- Succeeded by: Ilham Arief Sirajuddin

Personal details
- Born: 12 July 1952 Sengkang, Wajo, South Sulawesi, Indonesia
- Died: 10 March 2015 (aged 62) Makassar, South Sulawesi, Indonesia

Baso Amiruddin Maula (12 July 1952 – 10 March 2015) was an Indonesian politician who served as the mayor of Makassar between 1999 and 2004.

== Biography ==
Amiruddin was born in the town of Sengkang, Wajo Regency on 12 July 1952. Before becoming Makassar's mayor, Amiruddin had become a civil servant and was head of the city's revenues department.

He was elected as Makassar's mayor in 1999. In August that year, the city government issued a regulation regarding birth certificates, increasing the administrative fees to make one. The policy was reverted in 2002. In 2000, he also repurposed a colonial-era Dutch administrative building as a city museum.

He attempted to run for reelection in 2004, but he was defeated 24-21 in the city council vote by Ilham Arief Sirajuddin. His party then, Golkar, did not support his reelection and instead endorsed Sirajuddin. He later joined Hanura, and in 2007 he was the provincial chairman of the party in South Sulawesi.

Amiruddin was convicted of corruption in 2008, with accusations of having been directly involved in a 2003 purchase of fire trucks despite a lack of budgets and profiting Rp 600 million (USD 65,000) from the purchase. He was sentenced to 4 years in prison and fined Rp 200 million on top of returning the Rp 600 million, with appeals up to the Supreme Court upholding the sentence and increasing his prison term to five years. Prior to this, Amiruddin had been accused of corruption in a separate, land-sale case, but was found not guilty in 2006. In a defense of Amiruddin, a law professor from Hasanuddin University noted that the city government was acting on the instructions of the Home Affairs Ministry which issued specific instructions to purchase a specific build of fire trucks, which had limited suppliers. The same instruction also resulted in the conviction of other regional leaders - including the former governors of West Java and Riau and the mayor of Medan - for corruption.

In August 2010, Amiruddin was released from prison. After the sentencing, Amiruddin managed to obtain a doctorate in law at Hasanuddin University in March 2011. He died due to lung complications in his Makassar home on 10 March 2015. At the time of his death, he had four children.
