= Makassar City Regional House of Representatives =

Makassar City Regional House of Representatives Dewan Perwakilan Rakyat Daerah Kota Makassar
- 2024–2029 Period

Type
- Type: Unicameral

History
- Founded: 1959
- New session started: 9 September 2024

Leadership
- Speaker: Supratman, NasDem since 24 October 2024
- Deputy Speaker: Andi Suharmika, S.H., Golkar since 24 October 2024
- Deputy Speaker: Anwar Faruq, S.Kom., PKS since 24 October 2024
- Deputy Speaker: Eric Horas, S.E., M.M., Gerindra since 24 October 2024

Structure
- Seats: 50
- Political groups: Government (12) Golkar (6) Democratic (3) Hanura (2) Perindo (1) Opposition (38) NasDem (8) Gerindra (6) PKS (6) PDI-P (5) PKB (5) PPP (5) PAN (3)
- Length of term: 5 years

Elections
- Voting system: Open list proportional representation
- Last election: 14 February 2024

Meeting place
- Makassar City Regional House of Representatives Building; Andi Pangerang Pettarani Street Block E Number 1-2; Tidung, Rappocini, Makassar; South Sulawesi, Indonesia

Website
- dprd.makassarkota.go.id

The Makassar City Regional House of Representatives (Indonesian: Dewan Perwakilan Rakyat Daerah Kota Makassar, DPRD Kota Makassar) is the unicameral municipal legislature of Makassar, South Sulawesi, Indonesia. It has 50 members, who are elected every five years, simultaneously with the national legislative election.

== Legal basis ==
The legislature for Makassar was formed along with those of other cities in South Sulawesi under Law Number 29 of 1959, which organized city governments within the province.

== General election results ==
=== 2024 Indonesian legislative election ===
The official valid votes received by political parties contesting the 2024 Indonesian legislative election in each electoral district (constituency) for members of the Makassar City Regional House of Representatives are as follows.

2024 Indonesian legislative election results

Electoral district	PKB	Gerindra	PDI-P	Golkar	NasDem	Labour	Gelora	PKS	PKN	Hanura	Garuda	PAN	PBB	Democratic	PSI	Perindo	PPP	Ummat	Valid votes
Makassar City 1	21,088	11,725	9,052	15,257	16,750	342	1,171	12,296	269	8,882	0	7,850	556	9,614	4,320	1,860	10,246	1,264	132,542
Makassar City 2	9,475	9,893	11,903	32,053	22,826	470	3,142	5,697	96	6,461	0	12,985	1,002	10,808	2,256	2,842	7,193	817	139,919
Makassar City 3	10,674	9,106	14,649	17,956	20,634	471	3,683	15,477	87	3,065	0	15,879	192	19,686	2,082	9,718	13,206	1,334	157,899
Makassar City 4	13,530	17,835	10,048	17,228	20,394	542	5,491	18,924	67	2,559	0	17,783	549	4,747	2,832	4,046	10,008	1,790	148,373
Makassar City 5	12,167	27,199	11,188	14,715	14,152	1,266	2,627	27,277	67	9,555	0	6,653	48	5,560	4,320	2,561	9,142	1,047	149,544
Total	66,934	75,758	56,840	97,209	94,756	3,091	16,114	79,671	586	30,522	0	61,150	2,347	50,415	15,810	21,027	49,795	6,252	728,277
Source: General Elections Commission of Indonesia

== Composition ==
The following is the composition of members of the Makassar City Regional House of Representatives in the last three periods.

Party	Term of period		
Party	2014–2019	2019–2024	2024–2029
PKB seats	0	▲1	▲5
Gerindra seats	5	5	▲6
PDI-P seats	4	▲6	▼5
Golkar seats	8	▼5	▲6
NasDem seats	5	▲6	▲8
PKS seats	5	5	▲6
Hanura seats	5	▼3	▼2
PAN seats	4	▲5	▼3
PBB seats	1	▼0	0
Democratic seats	7	▼6	▼3
Perindo seats		2	▼1
PPP seats	5	5	5
Berkarya seats		1	
PKPI seats	1	▼0	
Total Seats	50	50	50
Total Party	11	▲12	▼11

== Electoral District ==
In the 2019 Legislative Election and the 2024 Legislative Election, the Makassar City Regional House of Representatives election was divided into 5 electoral districts as follows:

Electoral District Name	Electoral District Area	Number of Seats
MAKASSAR CITY 1	Makassar, Rappocini, Ujung Pandang	9
MAKASSAR CITY 2	Bontoala, Kepulauan Sangkarrang, Tallo, Ujung Tanah, Wajo	10
MAKASSAR CITY 3	Biringkanaya, Tamalanrea	11
MAKASSAR CITY 4	Manggala, Panakkukang	10
MAKASSAR CITY 5	Mamajang, Mariso, Tamalate	10
TOTAL		50

== See also ==
- Makassar
- South Sulawesi
