= 2020 Makassar mayoral election =

Local Mayoral Election held on 9th December 2020 in Makassar, Indonesia

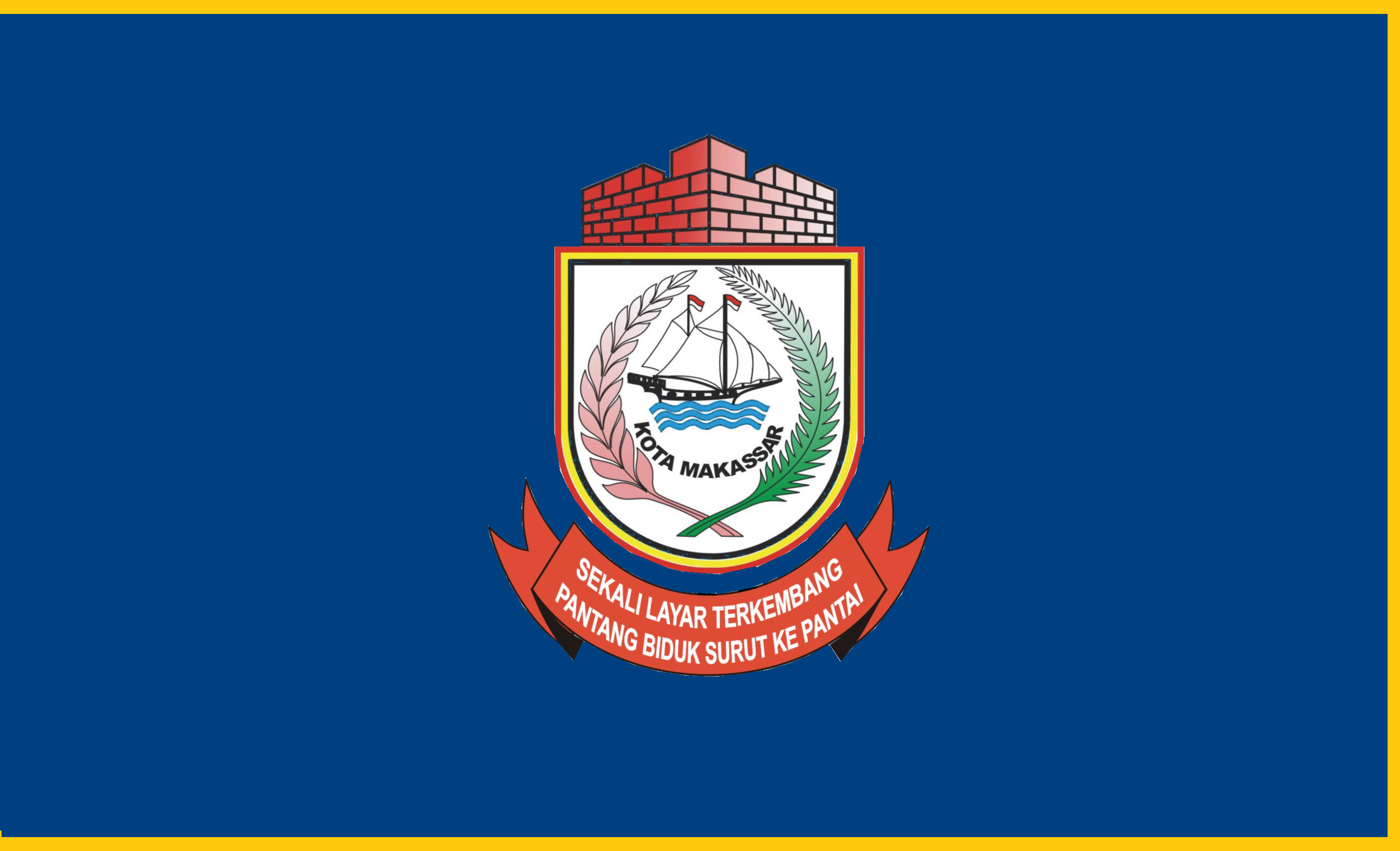
- 9 December 2020
- Registered: 901,087
- Turnout: 59.66%
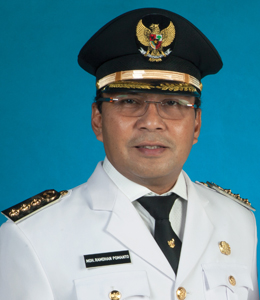

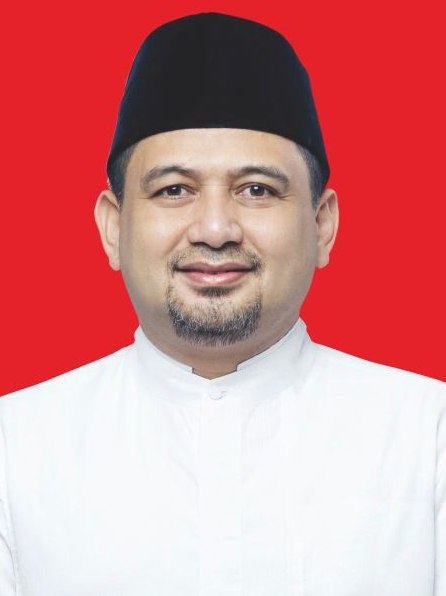

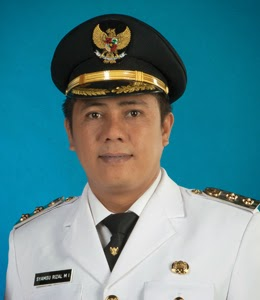

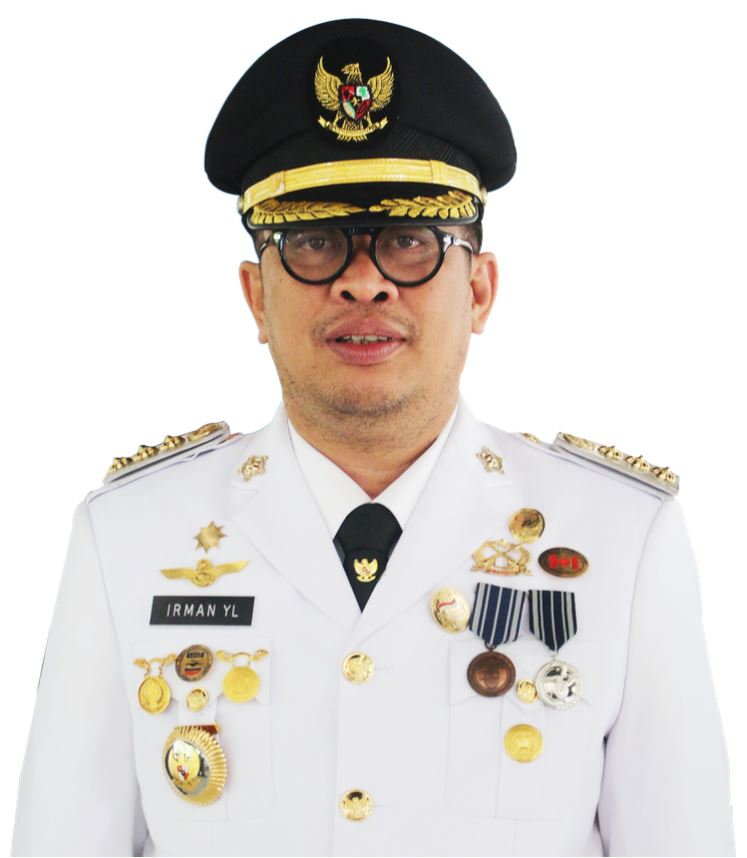
Candidate	Danny Pomanto	Munafri Arifuddin
Party	NasDem	Demokrat
Running mate	Fatmawati Rusdi	Abdul Rahman Bando
Popular vote	218,908	184,094
Percentage	41.33%	34.76%
Candidate	Syamsu Rizal	Irman Yasin Limpo
Party	PDI-P	Golkar
Running mate	Fadli Ananda	Andi Zunnun
Popular vote	100,869	25,817
Percentage	19.04%	4.87%
- Results map by subdistrict (Interactive version)
Mayor before election
Rudy Djamaluddin (acting)
Independent
Elected mayor
Danny Pomanto
NasDem

The 2020 Makassar mayoral election was held on 9 December 2020, as part of the 2020 simultaneous local elections in Indonesia. It is a repeat of the previous election held in 2018, an uncontested election where the none of the above option won a majority. The 2020 election saw the previous incumbent mayor, Mohammad Ramdhan Pomanto, the 2018 single candidate Munafri Arifuddin, run as mayor along with former deputy mayor Syamsu Rizal and former East Luwu regent Irman Yasin Limpo. Pomanto managed to beat the other three candidates to secure a second term after winning 41.3 percent of votes.

== Background ==
The 2018 mayoral elections in Makassar were initially slated to pit incumbent Mohammad Ramdhan Pomanto against challenger Munafri Arifuddin, however, following a court ruling, Pomanto was disqualified, due to alleged abuse of office to benefit in the election. Despite this, Arifuddin was still required to gain a majority of the votes, with a none of the above option being available in the ballot, and he ended up losing to said option by a margin of some 36,000 votes, the first case of a NOTA victory in Indonesian electoral history. The election was hence repeated, with registration for candidates being reopened and the election being held as part of the 2020 simultaneous local elections. Both Pomanto and Arifuddin were permitted to run as candidates as well.

== Candidates ==
Four tickets of candidates were registered for the election:

== Results ==
Pomanto won the election after winning 41.3 percent of votes, placing first in 14 out of 15 districts of Makassar.
