= Ilham Arief Sirajuddin =

Indonesian politician

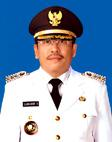

Mayor of Makassar
- In office 8 May 2004 – 8 May 2014
- Preceded by: Amiruddin Maula
- Succeeded by: Mohammad Ramdhan Pomanto

Member of South Sulawesi Regional People's Representative Council
- In office 1999–2004

Personal details
- Born: 16 September 1965 (age 59); Gowa, South Sulawesi, Indonesia

Ilham Arief Sirajuddin (born 16 September 1965) is an Indonesian former politician who was the mayor of Makassar between 2004 and 2014. He was convicted of corruption in 2016.

== Biography ==
Born in Gowa on 16 September 1965 with his father having been regent there, Sirajuddin received his education in Makassar and studied in Hasanuddin University. Sirajuddin was a eeo of South Sulawesi Regional People's Representative Council (DPRD Provinsi Sulawesi Selatan) between 1999 and 2004 as a member of Golkar. In 2004, he was elected as the mayor of Makassar, becoming Indonesia's youngest mayor at the time.

As mayor, Sirajuddin initiated the "Save Our Losari" program, aimed at cleaning up the beachfront area through the eviction of street hawkers and reclamation of space, among others, though the program encountered financial difficulties. Similarly, he pushed for development in the Karebosi area of the city, though he faced opposition from groups wanting to preserve the historic area.

In the 2009 mayoral election, Sirajuddin was reelected and was sworn in for his second term on 8 May 2009, becoming only the second mayor of the city two serve two terms. Sirajuddin ran for governorship of the province in the 2013 gubernatorial election, but he lost to incumbent Syahrul Yasin Limpo.

After the expiry of his mayorship, Sirajuddin was investigated by the Corruption Eradication Commission and in July 2015 was arrested and later sentenced to four years in prison for a graft case involving the city's water utility company.

== Family ==
His wife Aliyah Mustika Ilham is a member of the People's Representative Council (DPR) from the Democratic Party and his son is a legislative candidate for DPR in the 2019 election, also from the Democratic Party.
