= Munafri Arifuddin =

Indonesian businessman (born 1975)

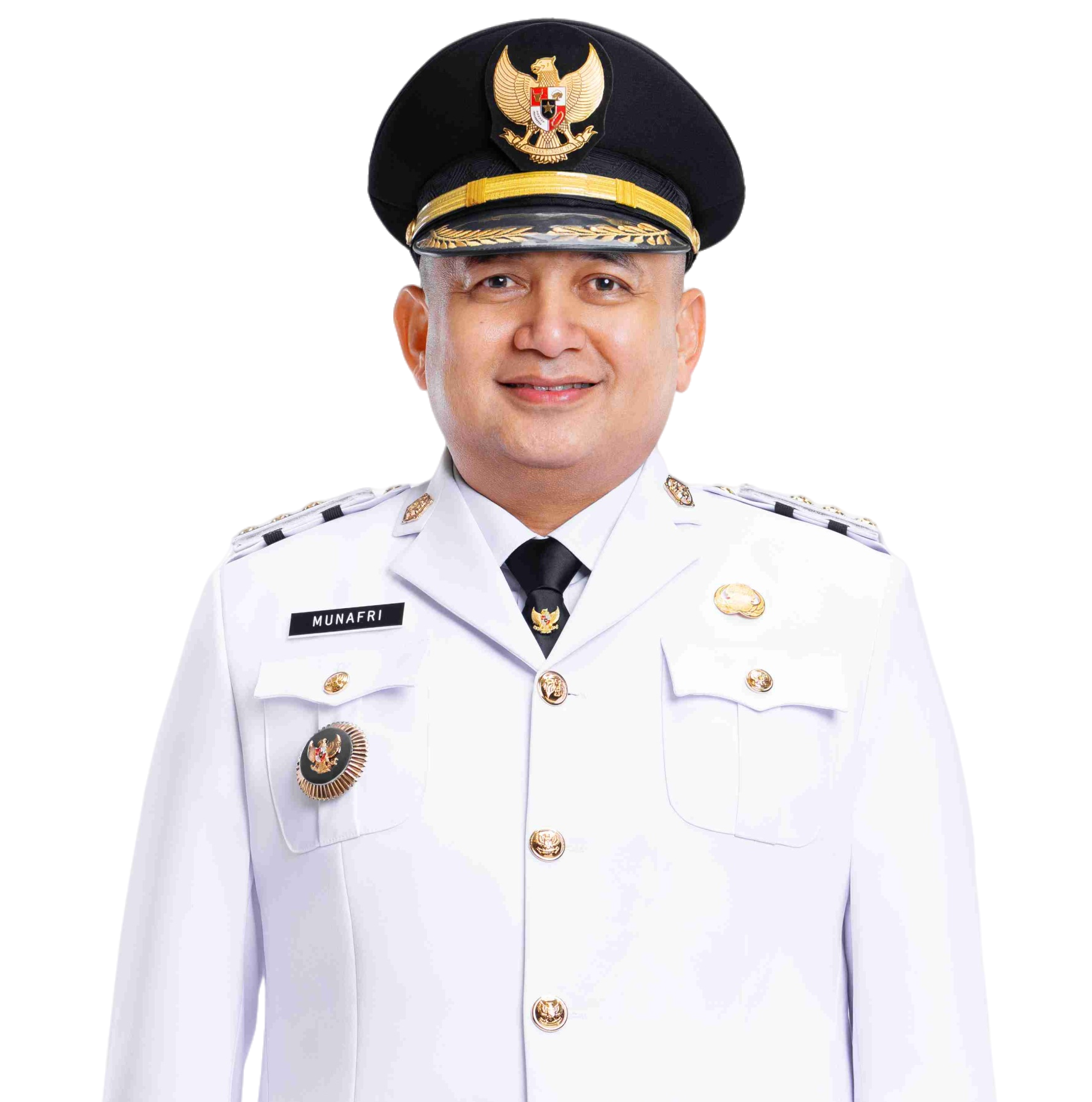

21st Mayor of Makassar
- Incumbent
- Assumed office 20 February 2025
- Governor: Andi Sudirman Sulaiman
- Deputy: Aliyah Mustika Ilham
- Preceded by: Mohammad Ramdhan Pomanto

Personal details
- Born: 20 September 1975 (age 50) Majene, Indonesia
- Party: Golkar
- Occupation: Businessman
- Known for: Former CEO of PSM Makassar

Munafri Arifuddin (born 20 September 1975) is an Indonesian politician and businessman who is the mayor of Makassar, serving since February 2025. He is also the former CEO of the football club PSM Makassar and the current Director of PT Liga Indonesia Baru.

Son-in-law of Bosowa Corporation founder Aksa Mahmud and relative of Jusuf Kalla, he worked at Bosowa Group before joining the football club. In 2018, he ran for the mayoral election in Makassar as a single candidate after his opponent was disqualified, but lost to an empty ballot. After losing the repeat election in 2020, he would be elected as mayor in the 2024 mayoral election.

== Background and family ==
Munafri was born in Majene, South Sulawesi (today part of West Sulawesi) on 20 September 1975. His father-in law, Aksa Mahmud, is the founder of the Bosowa Corporation and one of the richest men in Indonesia, in addition to being the brother-in-law of Jusuf Kalla, the 10th and 12th Vice President of Indonesia. Munafri's wife Melinda Aksa Mahmud is the CEO of Bosowa Education; the couple have four children.

Munafri studied for primary, secondary and tertiary school all in Makassar, and earns his bachelor's degree in law from Hasanuddin University in 1999.

== Career ==
Munafri worked for his father-in-law for some time, including as CEO for several of the companies within the group. He also served as chairman of South Sulawesi's young entrepreneurs association between 2007 and 2010.

=== PSM Makassar ===
In 2016, shareholders of PSM Makassar elected Munafri as the new CEO for the club, replacing Rully Habibie. Before, Munafri had worked on clubs such as Hasanuddin FC and Perseka Bosowa. At that time, he was working at Corporate Relations in Bosowa.

After becoming the last-ranked team in the league following the first four matches in his first season, Munafri fired the club manager Luciano Leandro and brought in Robert Alberts. In addition, nine foreign players were also removed. PSM finished sixth that season.

=== Elections ===
During the 2018 Indonesian local elections, Munafri registered to run as mayor of Makassar, the capital and largest city of South Sulawesi. Being a member of Golkar, he was supported by 10 political parties representing 43 of the 50 seats in Makassar's city council. His opponent was incumbent mayor Mohammad Ramdhan Pomanto. However, Pomanto was disqualified by the city's electoral commission, citing procedural flaws. This resulted in Munafri running as a single candidate, but he was still required to win over half of the votes to be elected as a none of the above option was available.

In the election itself, Munafri secured 264,245 votes, while 300,795 voted for the empty ballot. While Munafri brought the case to the Constitutional Court, the court denied his case and reiterated the electoral commission's ruling, forcing a repeat election to be held in 2020 and an appointee to act as mayor. Munafri's loss marked the first ever victory for the none of the above option in elections for Indonesian regional leaders.

In his second run in 2020, Arifuddin again faced Pomanto alongside two other tickets and lost, winning 34.7% of votes to Pomanto's 41.3%.

Arifuddin successfully ran for a seat in the South Sulawesi Regional House of Representatives in the 2024 election, winning 29,802 votes.

=== Continued politics ===
He became the chairman of Golkar's Makassar branch in March 2021. In November 2021, he was appointed honorary consul of Croatia in Makassar.
