= Mohammad Ramdhan Pomanto =

Indonesian politician and mayor of Makassar

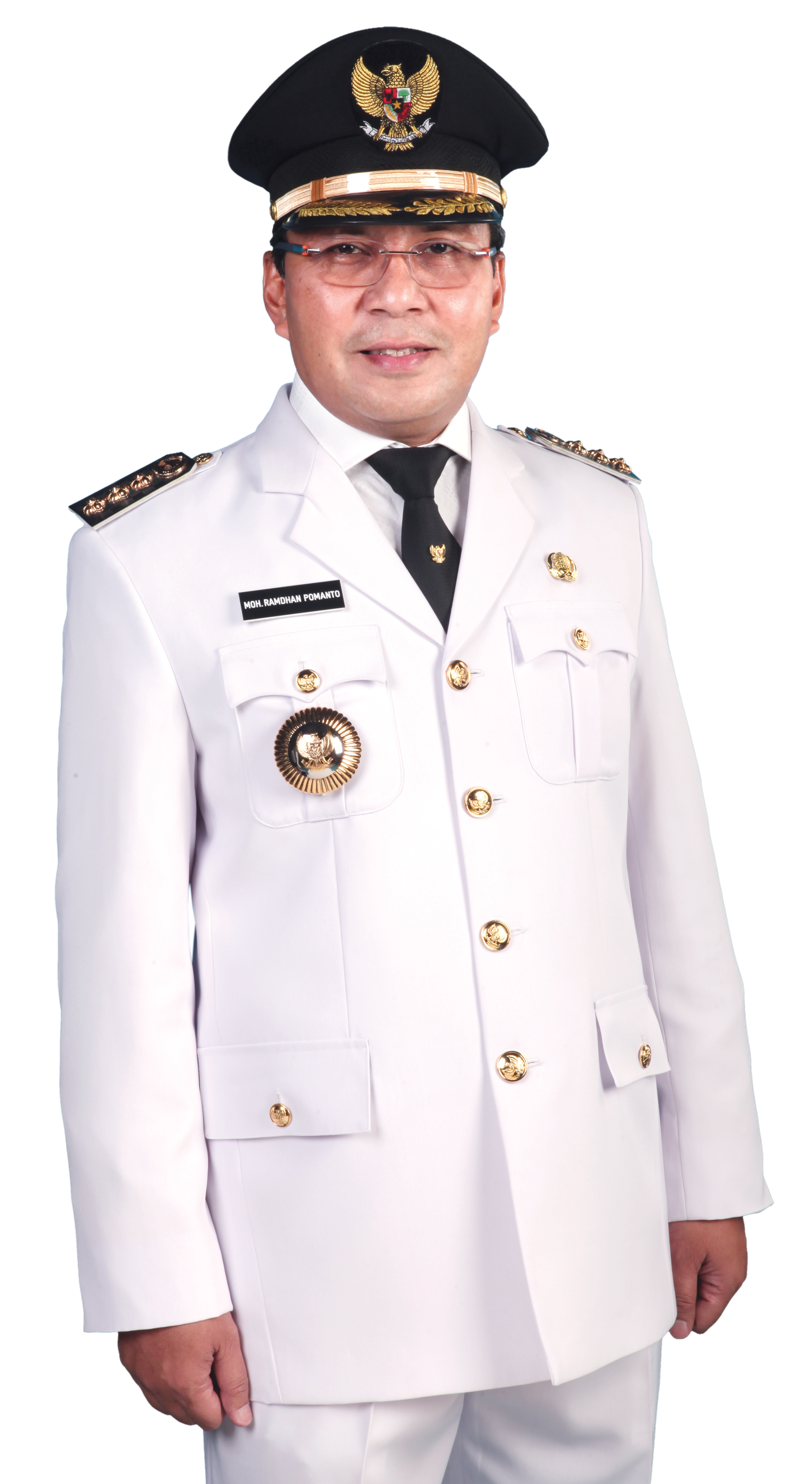

Mayor of Makassar
- In office 26 February 2021 – 20 February 2025
- President: Joko Widodo
- Governor: Nurdin Abdullah; Sudirman Sulaiman
- Preceded by: Rudy Djamaluddin (acting)
- Succeeded by: Munafri Arifuddin
- In office 8 May 2014 – 8 May 2019
- President: Susilo Bambang Yudhoyono; Joko Widodo
- Governor: Syahrul Yasin Limpo; Soni Sumarsono (acting); Nurdin Abdullah
- Deputy: Syamsu Rizal
- Preceded by: Ilham Arief Sirajuddin
- Succeeded by: Iqbal Samad Suhaeb (acting)

Personal details
- Born: 30 January 1964 (age 62) Makassar, South Sulawesi, Indonesia
- Party: PDI-P
- Other political affiliations: Nasdem (until 2023)
- Spouse: Indira Jusuf Ismail

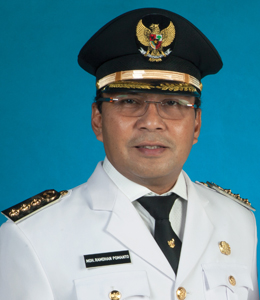
Pomanto's first term official portrait

Mohammad Ramdhan Pomanto, also known as Danny Pomanto, (born 30 January 1964) is an Indonesian politician who served as the mayor of Makassar, the fourth largest extended metropolitan area in Indonesia, between 2014-2019 and 2021-2025

Pomanto is a graduate of the faculty of engineering at Hasanuddin University, where he also served as a lecturer prior to holding office. He has developed over six hundred architectural designs in over seventy cities and regencies. He was elected as Mayor of Makassar following local elections in 2013, where he won 31.18% of the votes (182,484 votes). He tried to run for a second term in the 2018 election, but his candidacy was disputed and he was declared ineligible to run, with his competitor Munafri Arifuddin facing and losing to an empty ballot.

He ran again in 2020 with the support of NasDem Party and Gerindra Party, and won a second term after securing 41.3% of votes.
