= Makassar =

Capital and largest city of South Sulawesi, Indonesia

Makassar Ujung Pandang
- City
- City of Makassar; Kota Makassar

Regional transcription(s)
  - Makassarese: Mangkasara / Jumpandang ᨆᨀᨔᨑ / ᨍᨘᨄᨉ (Lontara')
  - Buginese: Mangkasa / Juppandang ᨆᨃᨔ / ᨍᨘᨄᨉ (Lontara')
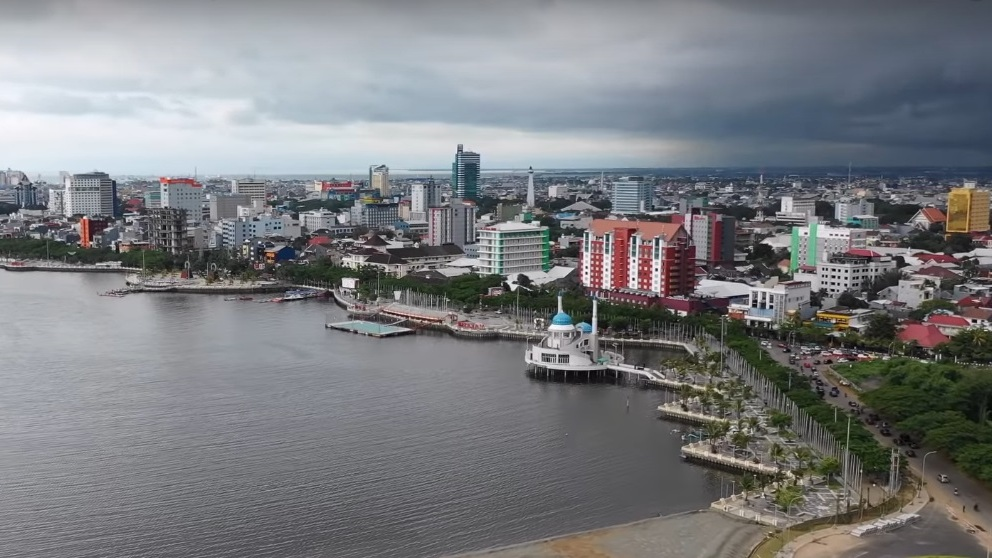
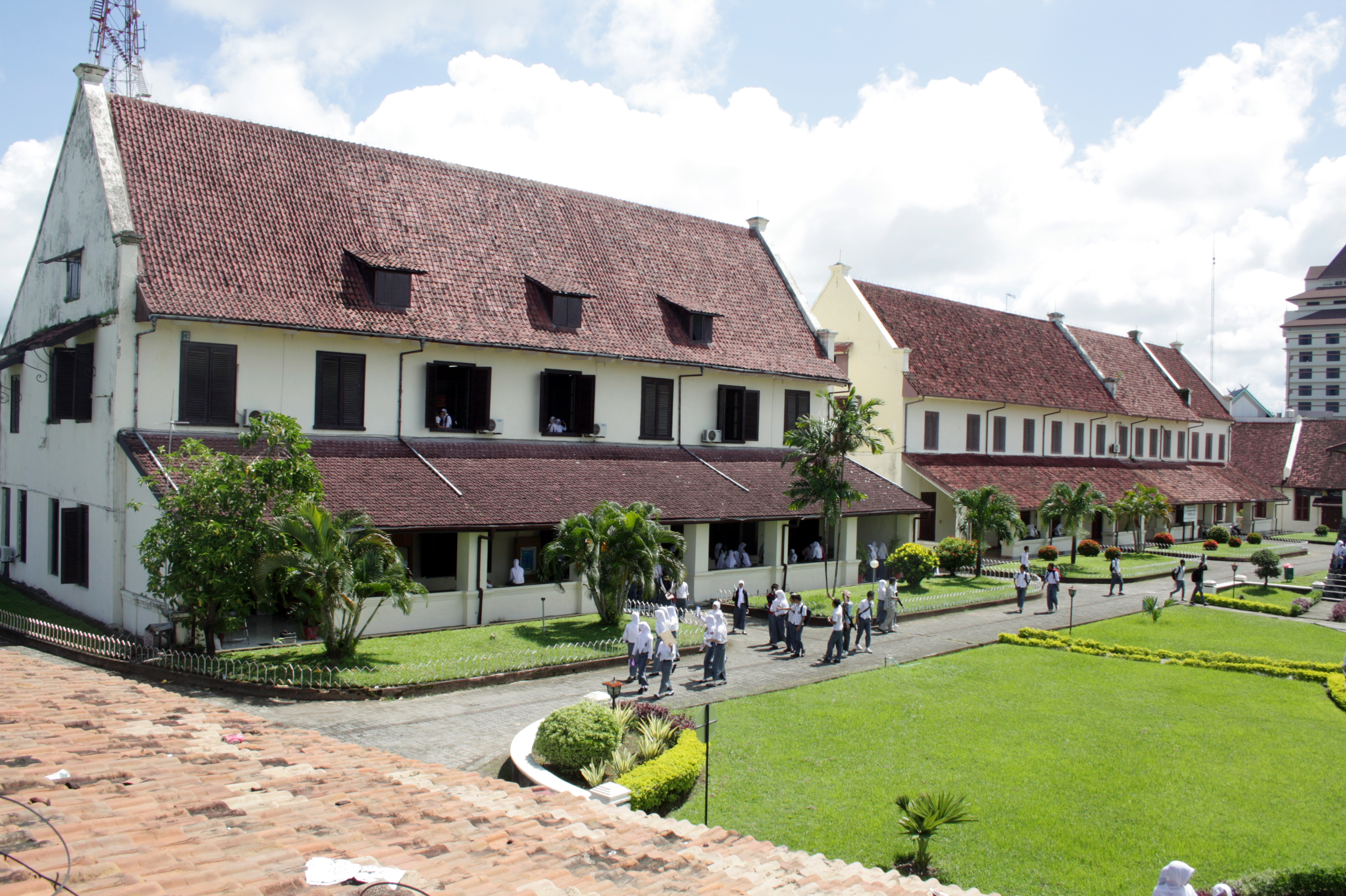
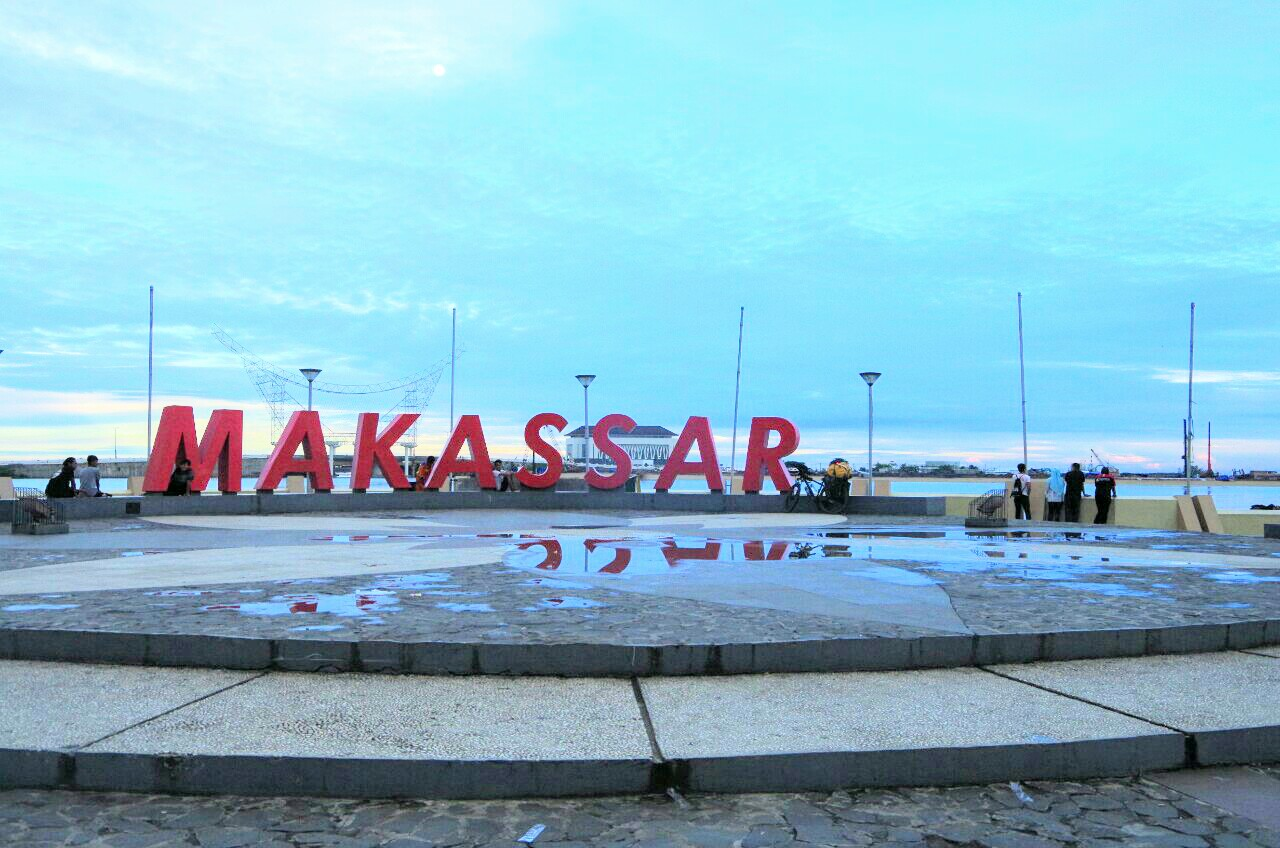
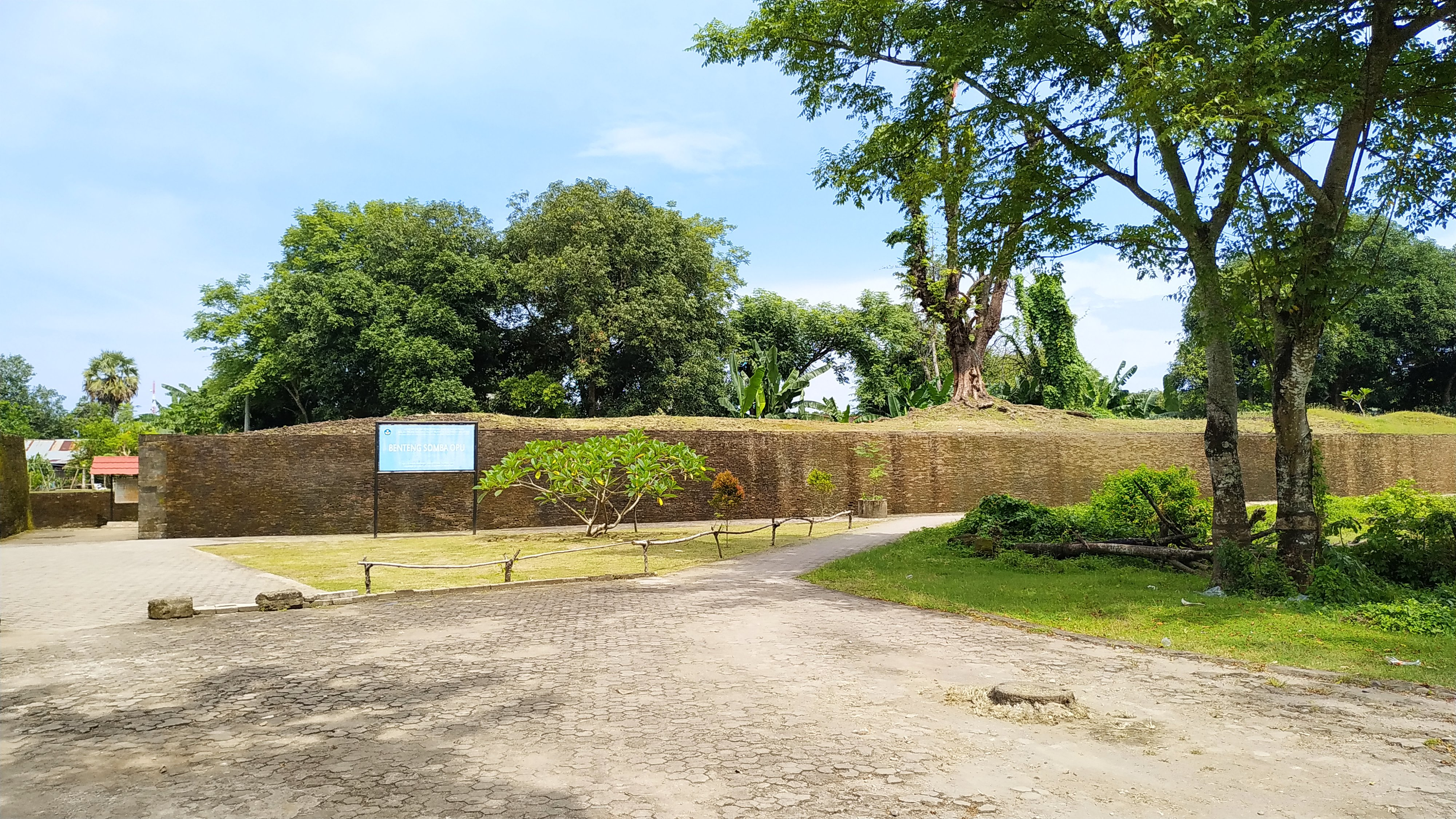
- Makassar seaside and Losari Beach Fort Rotterdam Losari promenade Fort Somba Opu 99 Domes Mosque

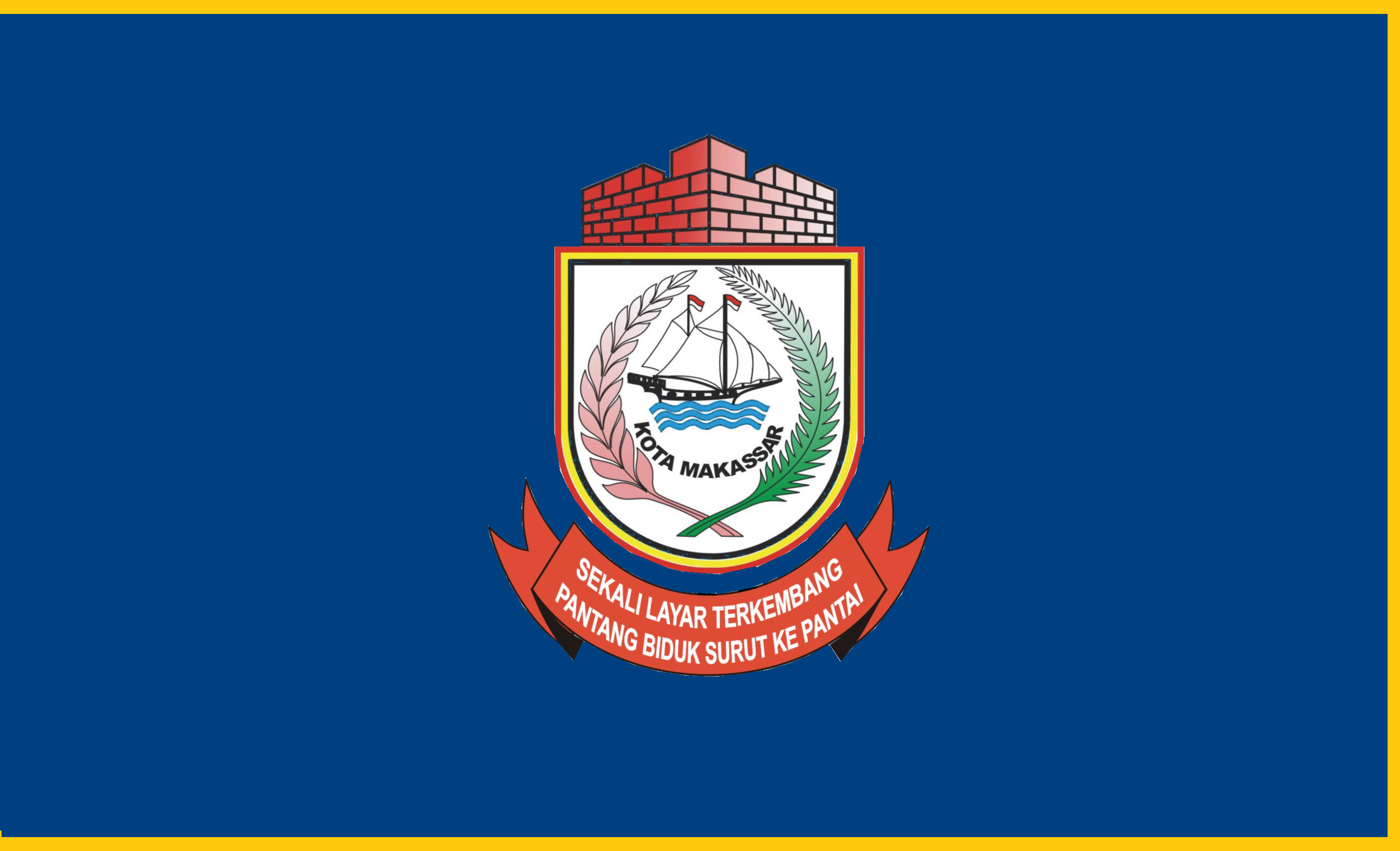
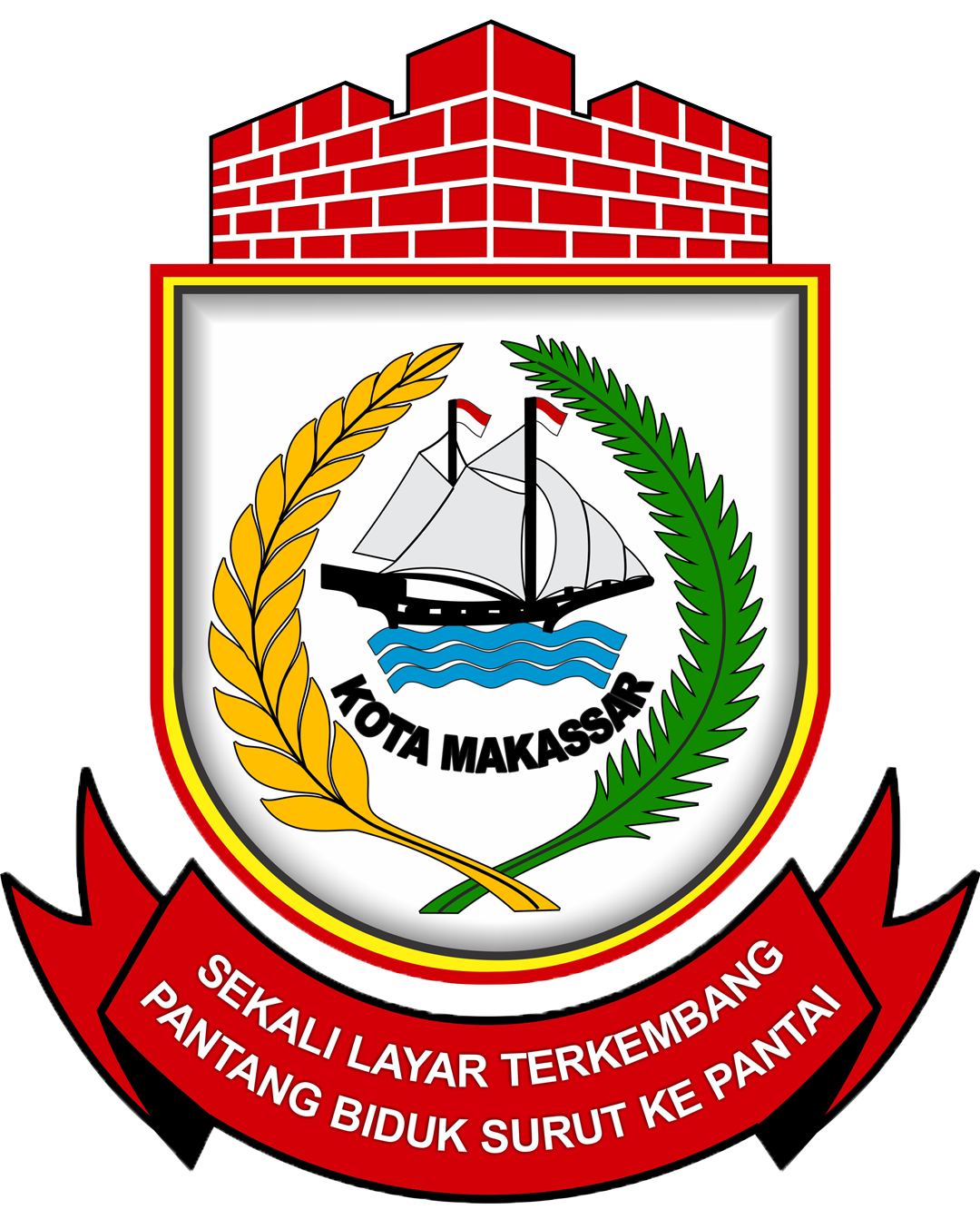
- Flag Coat of arms
- Motto: Sekali Layar Terkembang, Pantang Biduk Surut ke Pantai "Once the sails are set, we shan't return to shore"
- Location within South Sulawesi
- Interactive map of Makassar
- Location in Sulawesi and Indonesia Makassar (Indonesia)
- Coordinates: 5°07′59″S 119°24′49″E
- Country: Indonesia
- Province: South Sulawesi
- Metropolitan area: Mamminasatapa
- Founded: 9 November 1607

Government
  - Type: Mayor-council
  - Body: Makassar City Government
  - Mayor: Munafri Arifuddin (Golkar)
  - Vice Mayor: Aliyah Mustika
  - Legislature: Makassar City Regional House of Representatives (DPRD)

Area
  - City: 175.77 km^{2} (67.87 sq mi)
  - Metro: 2,666.63 km^{2} (1,029.59 sq mi)
- Elevation: 0–25 m (0–82 ft)

Population (mid 2025 estimate)
  - City: 1,485,077
  - Rank: 10th
  - Density: 8,449.0/km^{2} (21,883/sq mi)
  - Metro: 2,795,639
  - Metro density: 1,048.38/km^{2} (2,715.29/sq mi)
- Demonym: Makassarian

Nominal GDP (nominal, 2023)
  - Total: Rp 226.903 trillion US$ 14.886 billion
  - Per capita: Rp 155.952 million US$ 10,232
- Time zone: UTC+8 (Indonesia Central Time)
- Area code: (+62) 411
- Vehicle registration: DD
- HDI (2024): ▲0.839 (13th) very high
- Website: makassarkota.go.id

Makassar, (Note: /məˈkæsər/ mə-KASS-ər; Indonesian: [maˈkas.sar]; Makasar: ᨆᨀᨔᨑ, Serang: مَعْۨكَاسَارَاءْ, romanized: Mangkasara', pronounced [mãŋˈkʰasaraʔ]; Buginese pronunciation: [maŋkasaʔ]) formerly Ujung Pandang (1971–1999), (Note: UK: /ˈuːdʒʊŋ pænˈdæŋ/ OO-juung pan-DANG; Indonesian pronunciation: [ˈud͡ʒʊŋ ˈpandaŋ]; Makasar: ᨍᨘᨄᨉ, Serang: جُومْڡَۨانْدَاعْۨ, romanized: Jumpandang, pronounced [ɟumˈpandaŋ]) is the capital of the Indonesian province of South Sulawesi. It is the largest city in the region of Eastern Indonesia and the country's fifth-largest urban center after Jakarta, Surabaya, Medan, and Bandung. The city is located on the southwest coast of the island of Sulawesi, facing the Makassar Strait.

Throughout its history, Makassar has been an important trading port, hosting the center of the Gowa Sultanate and a Portuguese naval base before its conquest by the Dutch East India Company in the 17th century. It remained an important port in the Dutch East Indies, serving Eastern Indonesian regions with Makassarese fishers going as far south as the Australian coast. For a brief period after the proclamation of Indonesian independence in 1946, Makassar was designated the capital of the State of East Indonesia, a Dutch puppet state; however, in 1950, only four years into its existence as an independent state, the Makassar Uprising took place, resulting in the country's integration into the Republic of Indonesia.

The city's area is 175.77 square kilometres (67.87 sq mi), and it had a population of approximately 1.485 million (737,239 males and 747,838 females) as of mid 2025 within Makassar City's fifteen administrative districts. Its official metropolitan area, known as Mamminasata, with the addition of thirty-three further districts of neighbouring regencies, covers an area of 2,666.63 square kilometres (1,029.59 sq mi) and had a population of around 2,795,639 according to the mid 2025 official estimates.

According to the National Development Planning Agency, Makassar is one of the four main cities of Indonesia, alongside Medan, Jakarta, and Surabaya.

According to Bank Indonesia, Makassar has the second-highest commercial property values in Indonesia, after Greater Jakarta.

== Names and etymology ==
The name Makassar was long spelled Macassar in English and many other European languages, whereas the Portuguese spelled it Macáçar during their presence there in the 17th century.

The Dutch spelled the name both Makasser and Makassar during their rule over the city as part of the Dutch East Indies. With the independence following World War II, the Indonesians kept the Dutch spelling of Makassar with a double 's', despite the fact that the Indonesian language does not have geminate consonants (although the Makassar and Bugis languages do have them, neither has such geminate -ss- in their names for this city).

On 1 September 1971, the city was renamed after a variant of the pre-colonial name of the city's Fort Rotterdam, Ujung Pandang (Makassarese: Jumpandang).

The action was taken at the time Makassar was expanding from its original 21 km^{2} to encompass neighbouring regions to de-emphasise the ethnic connotations of the name, enlarged to its present area. Ujung Pandang remained locally unpopular and, on 13 October 1999, the name reverted to Makassar under President B. J. Habibie, himself a native of South Sulawesi.

In the local language, the city is known as Mangkasara′, written ᨆᨀᨔᨑ in the Lontara script traditionally used to write Makassarese as well as Buginese, which is also widely spoken in the city.

The adjective form of the city's name and the eponymous ethnic group has varied over time. In English, Macassarese, Makassarese, and Macassan have all been used, although the latter is usually used in the historical context of trepangers in northern Australia (the Macassan contact with Australia) and may include people not from Makassar. More recently, forms such as Makasarese and simply Makasar (both with a single 's') have appeared.

== History ==
The trade in spices figured prominently in the history of Sulawesi, which involved frequent struggles between rival native and foreign powers for control of the lucrative trade during the pre-colonial and colonial period, when spices from the region were in high demand in the West. Much of South Sulawesi's early history was written in old texts that can be traced back to the 13th and 14th centuries.

Makassar is mentioned in the Nagarakretagama, a Javanese eulogy composed in the 14th century during the reign of Majapahit king Hayam Wuruk. In the text, Makassar is mentioned as an island under Majapahit dominance, alongside Butun, Salaya, and Banggawi.

=== Makassarese kingdom ===
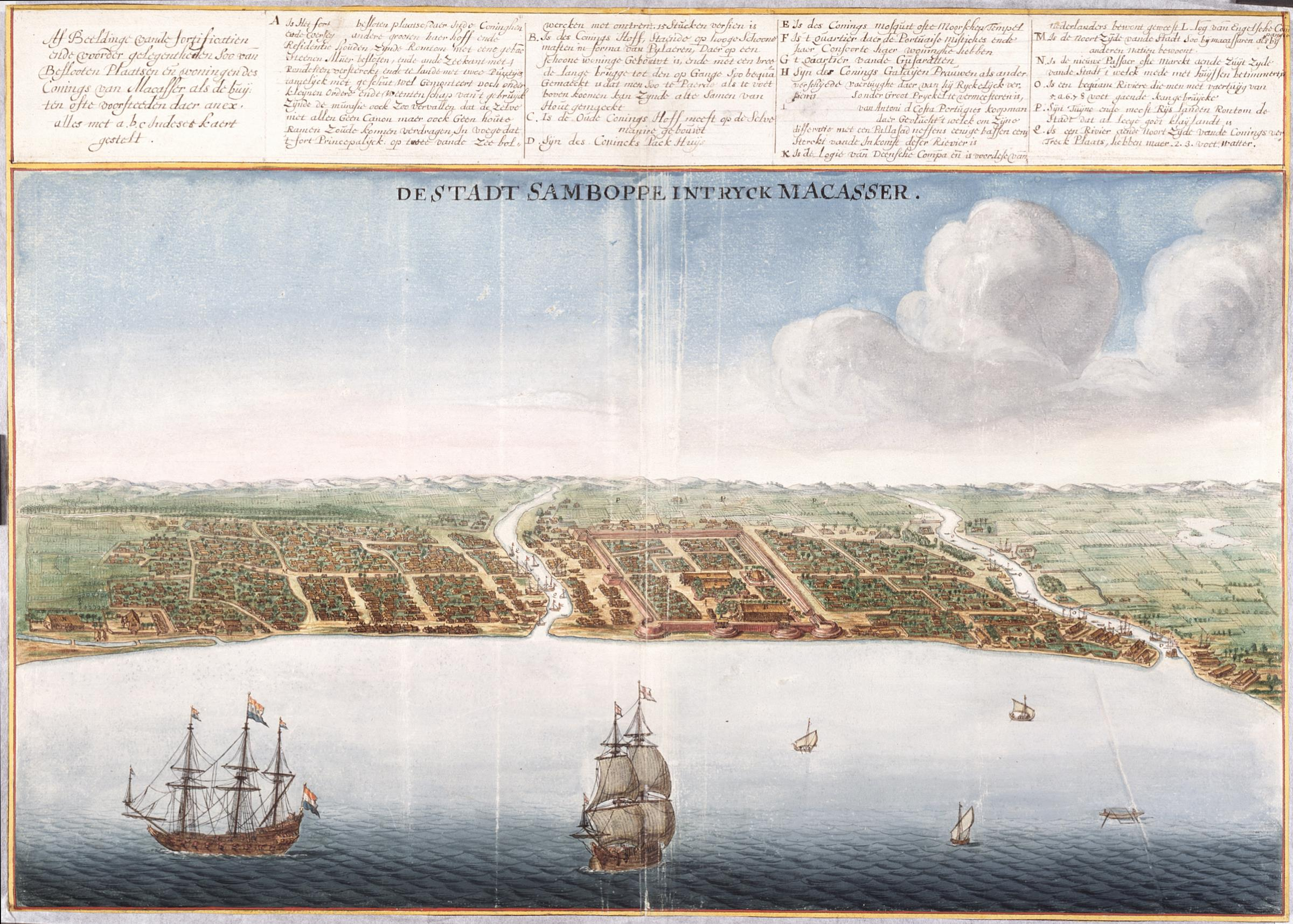
Fort Samboppe Palace within the city of Makassar, c. 1665, map by Johannes Vingboons.

The 9th King of Gowa Tumaparisi Kallonna (1512–1546) is described in the royal chronicle as the first Gowa ruler to ally with the nearby trade-oriented polity of Tallo, a partnership which endured throughout Makassar's apogee as an independent kingdom. The center of the dual kingdom was at Sombaopu, near the then mouth of the Jeneberang River, about 10 km south of the present city center, where an international port and a fortress were gradually developed. First Malay traders (expelled from their Melaka metropolis by the Portuguese in 1511), then Portuguese from at least the 1540s, began to make this port their base for trading to the Spice Islands (Maluku), further east.

The growth of Dutch maritime power over the spice trade after 1600 made Makassar more vital as an alternative port open to all traders, as well as a source of rice to trade with rice-deficient Maluku.

The Dutch East India Company (VOC) sought a monopoly of Malukan nutmeg and cloves and came close to succeeding at the expense of the English, Portuguese, and Muslims from the 1620s. The Makassar kings maintained a policy of free trade, insisting on the right of any visitor to do business in the city, and rejecting the attempts of the Dutch to establish a monopoly.

Makassar depended mainly on the Muslim Malay and Catholic Portuguese sailors communities as its two crucial economic assets. However, the English East India Company also established a post there in 1613, the Danish Company arrived in 1618, and Chinese, Spanish, and Indian traders were all important. When the Dutch conquered Portuguese Melaka in 1641, Makassar became the most extensive Portuguese base in Southeast Asia.

The Portuguese population had been in the hundreds but rose to several thousand, served by churches of the Franciscans, Dominicans, and Jesuits as well as the regular clergy. By the 16th century, Makassar had become Sulawesi's principal port and center of the powerful Gowa and Tallo sultanates, which, between them, had a series of 11 fortresses and strongholds, as well as a fortified sea wall that extended along the coast.

Portuguese rulers called the city Macáçar. Makassar was very ably led in the first half of the 17th century when it effectively resisted Dutch pressure to close down its trade to Maluku and made allies rather than enemies of the neighboring Bugis states. Karaeng Matoaya (c.1573–1636) was the ruler of Tallo from 1593, as well as Chancellor or Chief Minister (Tuma'bicara-butta) of the partner kingdom of Gowa. He managed the succession to the Gowa throne in 1593 of the 7-year-old boy later known as Sultan Alaud-din, and guided him through the acceptance of Islam in 1603, numerous modernizations in military and civil governance, and cordial relations with the foreign traders. The conversion of the citizens to Islam was followed by the first official Friday Prayer in the city, traditionally dated to 9 November 1607, which is celebrated today as the city's official anniversary. John Jourdain called Makassar in his day "the kindest people in all the Indias to strangers."

Matoaya's eldest son succeeded him on the throne of Tallo, but as Chancellor, he had evidently groomed his brilliant second son, Karaeng Pattingalloang (1600–54), who exercised that position from 1639 until his death. Pattingalloang must have been partly educated by Portuguese, since as an adult he spoke Portuguese "as fluently as people from Lisbon itself", and avidly read all the books that came his way in Portuguese, Spanish or Latin. A French Jesuit, Father Alexandre de Rhodes, described Pattingalloang's passion for mathematics and astronomy, on which he pestered the priest endlessly, while even one of his Dutch adversaries conceded he was "a man of great knowledge, science and understanding."

=== Dutch colonial period ===
Coat of arms found in the gates of the walled city of Vlaardingen, granted by Cornelis Speelman in 1667.

Lithograph of Fort Rotterdam in Makassar by Charles William Meredith van de Velde, 1845

After Pattingalloang's death in 1654, a new king of Gowa, Sultan Hasanuddin, rejected the alliance with Tallo by declaring he would be his own Chancellor. Conflicts within the kingdom quickly escalated, the Bugis rebelled under the leadership of Bone, and the Dutch VOC seized its long-awaited chance to conquer Makassar with the help of the Bugis (1667–69).

Their first conquest in 1667 was the northern Makassar fort of Ujung Pandang, while in 1669 they conquered and destroyed Sombaopu in one of the greatest battles of 17th century Indonesia. The VOC moved the city center northward, around the Ujung Pandang fort they rebuilt and renamed Fort Rotterdam. From this base, they managed to destroy the strongholds of the Sultan of Gowa, who was then forced to live on the outskirts of Makassar. Following the Diponegoro War (1825–30), Prince Diponegoro was exiled to Fort Rotterdam until his death in 1855.

After the arrival of the Dutch, there was an important Portuguese community, also called a bandel, that received the name of Borrobos.

Around 1660 the leader of this community, which today would be equivalent to a neighbourhood, was the Portuguese Francisco Vieira de Figueiredo.

The character of this old trading center changed as a walled city known as Vlaardingen grew. Gradually, in defiance of the Dutch, the Arabs, Malays and Buddhist returned to trade outside the fortress walls and were joined later by the Chinese.

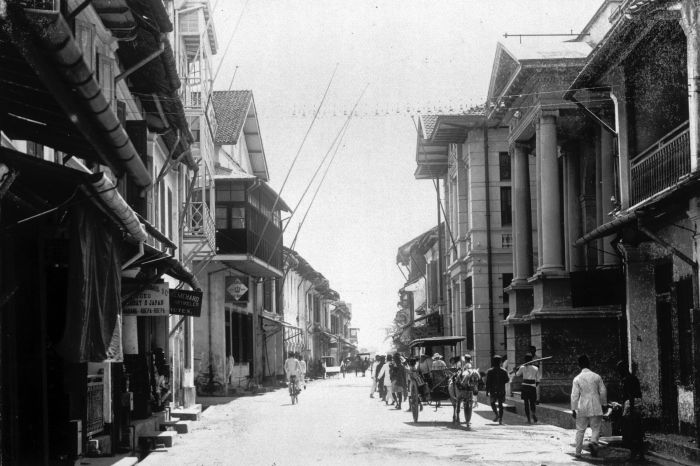
Market Street (Passarstraat) in the early 20th century

The town again became a collecting point for the produce of eastern Indonesia – the copra, rattan, Pearls, trepang and sandalwood and the famous oil made from bado nuts used in Europe as men's hairdressing – hence the anti-macassars (embroidered cloths protecting the head-rests of upholstered chairs).

Although the Dutch controlled the coast, it was not until the early 20th century that they gained power over the southern interior through a series of treaties with local rulers. Meanwhile, Dutch missionaries converted many of the Toraja people to Christianity. By 1938, the population of Makassar had reached around 84,000 – a town described by writer Joseph Conrad as "the prettiest and perhaps, cleanest looking of all the towns in the islands".

During World War II, the Makassar area was defended by approximately 1000 men of the Royal Netherlands East Indies Army commanded by Colonel M. Vooren. He decided that he could not defend the coast, and was planning to fight a guerrilla war inland. The Japanese landed near Makassar on 9 February 1942. The defenders retreated but were soon overtaken and captured.

=== After independence ===
In 1945, Indonesia proclaimed its Independence, and in 1946, Makassar became the capital of the State of East Indonesia, part of the United States of Indonesia. In 1950, it was the site of fighting between pro-Federalist forces under Captain Kahar Muzakkar and Republican forces under Colonel Sunkono during the Makassar uprising.

Between 1971 and 1999, the city was officially named Ujungpandang, before its official name reverted to Makassar on 13 October 1999.

== Geography ==
Makassar is the capital of the province of South Sulawesi, located in the southern part of Sulawesi Island, formerly known as Ujung Pandang, bordered to the north by Maros Regency and Pangkajene and Islands Regency, to the east by Maros Regency, to the south by Gowa Regency, and to the west by Makassar Strait. The area of Makassar City is recorded as 175.77 square kilometers.

Makassar City is a city located near the coast that stretches along the western and northern corridors and is also known as the "Waterfront City" which contains several rivers such as the Tallo River, Jeneberang River, and Pampang River) all of which flow into the city. Makassar City is a stretch of lowland at an altitude of between 0–25 meters above sea level.

=== Climate ===
Makassar has a tropical monsoon climate (Köppen: Am). The average temperature for the year in Makassar is 27.5 °C (81.5 °F), with little variation due to its near-equatorial latitude: the average high is around 32.5 °C (90.5 °F) and the average low around 22.5 °C (72.5 °F) all year long.

In contrast to the virtually consistent temperature, rainfall shows wide variation between months due to the movement of the Intertropical Convergence Zone. Makassar averages around 3,086 mm (121.50 in) of rain on 163 days during the year, but during the month with least rainfall – August – only 15 mm (0.59 in) on one day of rain can be expected. In contrast, during its wet season, Makassar can expect more than 500 mm (20 in) per month between December and February. During the wettest month of January, 734 mm (28.90 in) can be expected to fall on twenty-seven rainy days.

Climate data for Makassar (1991–2020 normals)
Month	Jan	Feb	Mar	Apr	May	Jun	Jul	Aug	Sep	Oct	Nov	Dec	Year
Mean daily maximum °C (°F)	31.0 (87.8)	31.2 (88.2)	31.7 (89.1)	32.1 (89.8)	32.4 (90.3)	32.0 (89.6)	31.7 (89.1)	32.0 (89.6)	32.7 (90.9)	33.1 (91.6)	32.7 (90.9)	31.3 (88.3)	32.0 (89.6)
Daily mean °C (°F)	27.7 (81.9)	27.7 (81.9)	27.9 (82.2)	28.2 (82.8)	28.4 (83.1)	27.9 (82.2)	27.6 (81.7)	27.8 (82.0)	28.2 (82.8)	28.7 (83.7)	28.5 (83.3)	27.9 (82.2)	28.0 (82.4)
Mean daily minimum °C (°F)	25.0 (77.0)	24.9 (76.8)	25.1 (77.2)	25.3 (77.5)	25.4 (77.7)	24.8 (76.6)	24.1 (75.4)	24.0 (75.2)	24.3 (75.7)	24.9 (76.8)	25.4 (77.7)	25.2 (77.4)	24.9 (76.8)
Average rainfall mm (inches)	734 (28.9)	563 (22.2)	391 (15.4)	235 (9.3)	97 (3.8)	66 (2.6)	48 (1.9)	15 (0.6)	32 (1.3)	83 (3.3)	273 (10.7)	549 (21.6)	3,086 (121.6)
Average rainy days	27	26	23	18	8	6	4	1	2	7	17	24	163
Mean daily sunshine hours	5.7	6.3	6.9	7.6	8.4	8.5	8.8	9.6	10.1	9.4	7.9	6.4	8.0
Source 1: World Meteorological Organization
Source 2: Weatherbase Weather2travel & Climate-Data.org

== Government ==
District map of Makassar

The executive head of the city is the mayor, who is elected by direct vote for a period of five years. The mayor is assisted by a vice mayor, who is also an elected official. There is a legislative assembly for the city, members of which are also elected for a period of five years.

=== Administrative divisions ===
Makassar City is divided into 15 administrative districts (kecamatan) and subdivided into 153 urban villages (kelurahan). The most recent creation was the Sangkarrang Islands District, created in 2017 to cover the small islands off the coast of the city. The districts are listed below with their areas and their populations at the 2010 Census and the 2020 Census, together with the official estimates as at mid 2025. The table also includes the number of administrative villages (all classed as urban kelurahan) in each district.

Kode Wilayah	Name of District (kecamatan)	Area in km^{2}	Pop'n Census 2010	Pop'n Census 2020	Pop'n Estimate mid 2025	No. of kelurahan
73.71.01	Mariso	1.82	56,313	57,426	59,045	9
73.71.02	Mamajang	2.25	59,133	56,049	58,141	13
73.71.10	Tamalate	20.21	169,890	180,824	190,782	11
73.71.13	Rappocini	9.23	151,357	144,587	151,192	11
73.71.03	Makassar (district)	2.52	81,901	82,067	81,758	14
73.71.04	Ujung Pandang	2.63	27,206	24,526	24,881	10
73.71.05	Wajo	1.99	29,670	29,972	29,001	8
73.71.06	Bontoala	2.10	54,268	54,996	55,113	12
73.71.08	Ujung Tanah	4.40	46,771	35,789	36,960	9
73.71.15	Sangkarrang; Islands ^{(a)}	1.54	^{(b)}	14,125	15,167	3
73.71.07	Tallo	5.83	133,815	144,977	148,078	15
73.71.09	Panakkukang	17.05	141,524	139,590	144,713	11
73.71.12	Manggala	24.14	117,303	146,724	164,475	9
73.71.11	Biringkanaya	48.22	167,843	209,048	217,814	11
73.71/14	Tamalanrea	31.84	101,669	103,770	107,957	8
	Totals	175.77	1,338,663	1,423,877	1,485,077	153

Notes: (a) The principal islands comprise (from south to north) Kodinggareng, Barrang Caddi and Barrang Lompo, each of which forms (with lesser islands) a kelurahan within the district.
(b) The 2010 population of the Sangkarrang Islands District (Kecamatan Kepulauan Sangkarrang) is included in the figure for the Ujung Tanah district, from which it was cut out in 2017.

== Demographics ==
Religion of Makassar – 2010 Census
Religion	Percent
Islam	87.19%
Christianity	9.43%
Buddhism	2.82%
Hinduism	0.14%
Others	0.42%

Makassar is a multi-ethnic city, populated mostly by the native Makassarese and Buginese. The remainder are Torajans, Mandarese, Butonese, Chinese (predominantly from the Cantonese dialect group) and Javanese. The current population as of mid 2025 is approximately 1,485,077, with a metropolitan total of 2,795,639.

Year	1971	1980	1990	2000	2010	2020	2025
Total population	434,766	708,465	944,372	1,130,384	1,338,663	1,423,877	1,485,077

== Economy ==
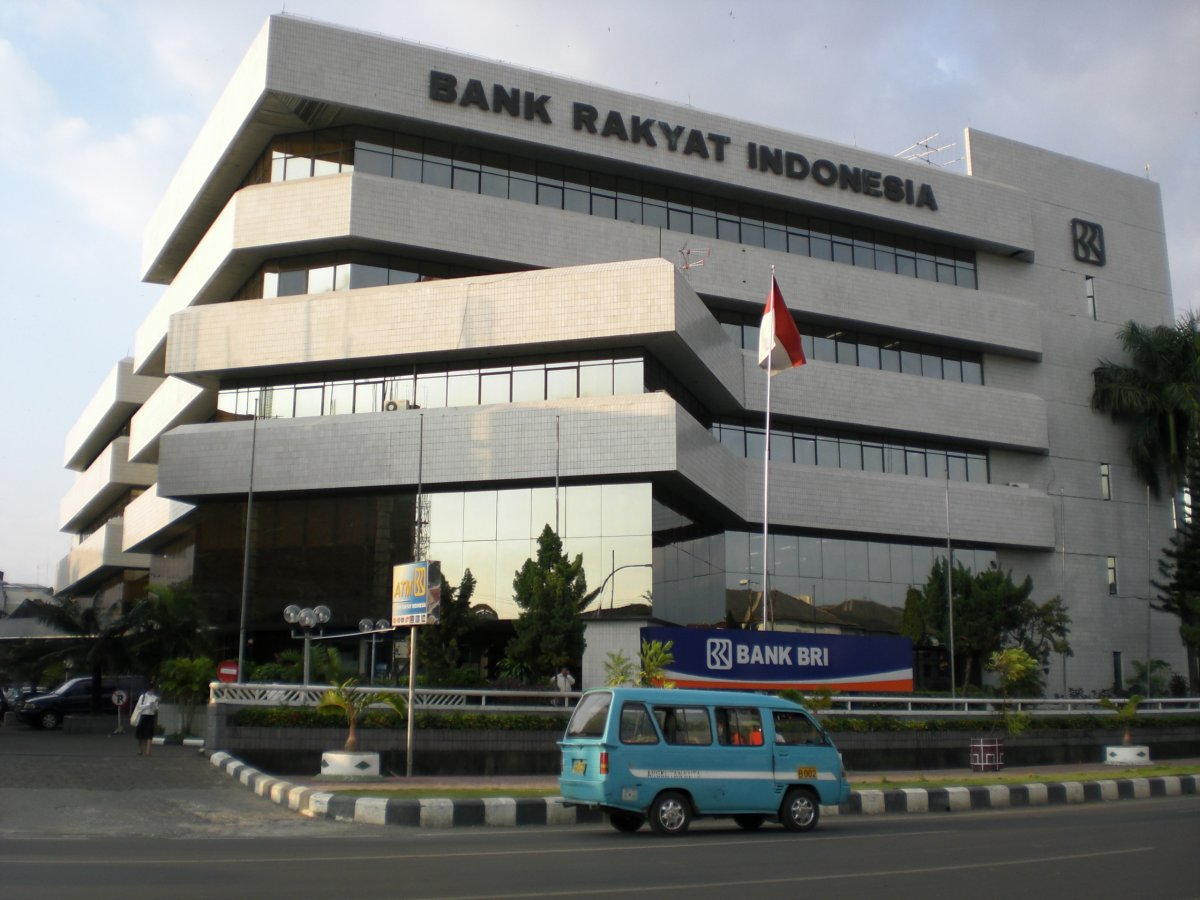
Bank Rakyat Indonesia's Makassar Branch Office, one of the largest banks operated in the city.

The city is one of Indonesia's primary ports, with regular international and domestic shipping connections. It is nationally famous as an essential port of call for the pinisi ships, wooden sailing ships which are among the last in use for regular long-distance trade.

During the colonial era, the city was widely known as the namesake of Makassar oil, which it exported in substantial quantity. Makassar ebony is a warm black hue, streaked with tan or brown tones, and highly prized for use in making fine cabinetry and veneers.

Nowadays, as the largest city in Sulawesi and Eastern Indonesia, the city's economy depends highly on the service sector, which makes up approximately 70% of activity. Restaurant and hotel services are the most significant contributor (29.14%), followed by transportation and communication (14.86%), trading (14.86), and finance (10.58%). Industrial activity is the next most important after the service sector, with 21.34% of overall activity. The Makassar Industrial Estate (Kawasan Industri Makassar), located within the city's boundaries, measures at 270.84 hectares.

=== Connection with Australia ===
Makassar is also a significant fishing center in Sulawesi. One of its major industries is the trepang (sea cucumber) industry. Trepang fishing brought the Makassan people into contact with Indigenous Australian peoples of northern Australia, long before European settlement (from 1788).

C. C. MacKnight in his 1976 work entitled Voyage to Marege: Macassan Trepangers in Northern Australia has shown that they began frequenting the north of Australia around 1700 in search of trepang (sea-slug, sea cucumber, Beche-de-mer), an edible Holothurian. They left their waters during the Northwest Monsoon in December or January for what is now Arnhem Land, Marriage or Marega and the Kimberley region or Kayu Djawa. They returned home with the south-east trade winds in April.

A fleet of between 24 and 26 Macassan perahus was seen in 1803 by French explorers under Nicolas Baudin on the Holothuria Banks in the Timor Sea. In February 1803, Matthew Flinders in the Investigator met six perahus with 20–25 men each on board and was told by the fleet's chief Pobasso, that there were 60 perahus then on the north Australian coast. They were fishing for trepang and appeared to have only a small compass as a navigation aid. In June 1818 Macassan trepang fishing was noted by Phillip Parker King in the vicinity of Port Essington in the Arafura Sea.

In 1865, R.J. Sholl, then Government Resident for the British settlement at Camden Sound (near Augustus Island in the Kimberley region) observed seven 'Macassan' perahus with a total of around 300 men on board. He believed that they made kidnapping raids and ranged as far south as Roebuck Bay (later Broome) where 'quite a fleet' was seen around 1866. Sholl believed that they did not venture south into other areas such as Nickol Bay (where the European pearling industry commenced around 1865) due to the absence of trepang in those waters.

The Macassan voyages appear to have ceased sometime in the late nineteenth century, and their place was taken by other sailors operating from elsewhere in the Indonesian archipelago.

A radio documentary on the trade between Makassar and North-East Arnhem Land, entitled "Trepang Trade", was made by the historian and film-maker Tom Murray for ABC Radio National in 2000. This work included descriptions of the trade made by Yolngu Aboriginal people who had visited Makassar with the trading boats, including a man called Djalatjerri (variously spelt as Djalatjirri or Djaladjari) who was interviewed by the anthropologists Ronald Berndt and Catherine Berndt. Other Yolngu recollections of the trade featured in this work are by Charlie Matjuwi Burarrwanga, a Gumatj man from Elcho Island, and Mowarra Ganambarr OAM, a Dätiwuy man from Rorruwuy in NE Arnhem Land.

== Transportation ==
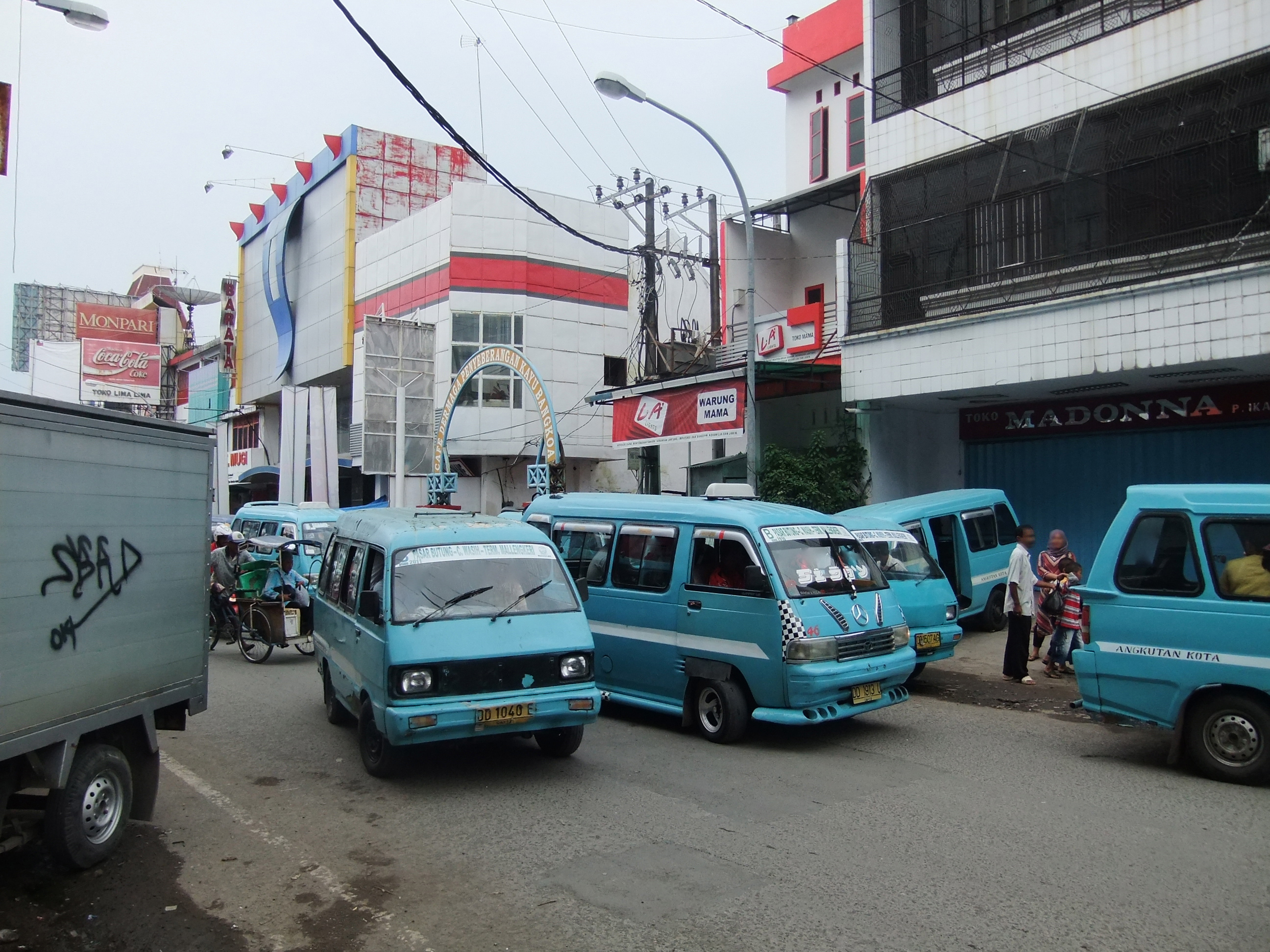
Pete-pete share taxi in Makassar

Makassar has a public transportation system called pete-pete. A pete-pete (known elsewhere in Indonesia as an angkot) is a share taxi that has been modified to carry passengers. The route of Makassar's pete-petes is denoted by the letter on the windshield. Makassar is also known for its becak (pedicabs), which are smaller than the "becak" on the island of Java. In addition to becak and pete-pete, the city has a government-run bus system, taxis and ride-hailing services such as Gojek.

A bus rapid transit (BRT), which is known as "Trans Mamminasata" was started in 2014. It has some routes through Makassar and connects to nearby cities including Maros, Takallar, and Gowa. Run by the Indonesian Transportation Department, each bus can accommodate 20 standing passengers in addition to 20 seats.

A 35-kilometer monorail in the areas of Makassar, Maros Regency, Sungguminasa (Gowa Regency), and Takalar Regency (the Mamminasata region) was proposed in 2011, with operations commencing in 2014, at a predicted cost of Rp.4 trillion ($468 million). The memorandum of understanding was signed on 25 July 2011 by Makassar city, Maros Regency and Gowa Regency. In 2014, the project was officially abandoned, citing insufficient ridership and a lack of financial feasibility.

The city of Makassar, its outlying districts, and the South Sulawesi Province are served by Sultan Hasanuddin International Airport. The airport is located outside the Makassar city administration area, being situated in the nearby Maros Regency.

The city is served by Soekarno-Hatta Sea Port. In January 2012 it was announced that due to limited capacity of the current dock at Soekarno-Hatta sea port, it would be expanded to 150x30 square meters to avoid the need for at least two ships to queue every day.

== Media ==
The oldest newspaper in the Makassar region is Fajar, part of Jawa Pos Group. Several other newspapers such as Tribun Timur and Ujungpandang Ekspres are also available.

The privately owned Fajar TV are the local TV stations based in Makassar. The public TVRI South Sulawesi is also covered the city.

== Traditional cuisine ==
Makassar has several famous traditional foods, the most famous of which is coto makassar. It is a soto (stew) made from a mixture of nuts, spices, and selected offal which may include beef brain, tongue and intestine. Konro, a rib dish, is also a popular traditional food in Makassar. Both coto makassar and konro are usually consumed with burasa or ketupat, a glutinous rice cake. Another famous dish from Makassar is ayam goreng sulawesi (Celebes fried chicken); the chicken is marinated with a traditional soy sauce recipe for up to 24 hours before being fried to a golden color. The dish is usually served with chicken broth, rice and special sambal (chilli sauce).

In addition, Makassar is the home of pisang epe (pressed banana), as well as pisang ijo (green banana). Pisang epe is a banana which is pressed, grilled, and covered with palm sugar sauce and sometimes consumed with durian. Many street vendors sell pisang epe, especially around the area of Losari Beach. Pisang ijo is a banana covered with green colored flour, coconut milk, and syrup. Pisang ijo is sometimes served iced and local fasting Muslims often consume it at iftar during Ramadan.

== Education ==
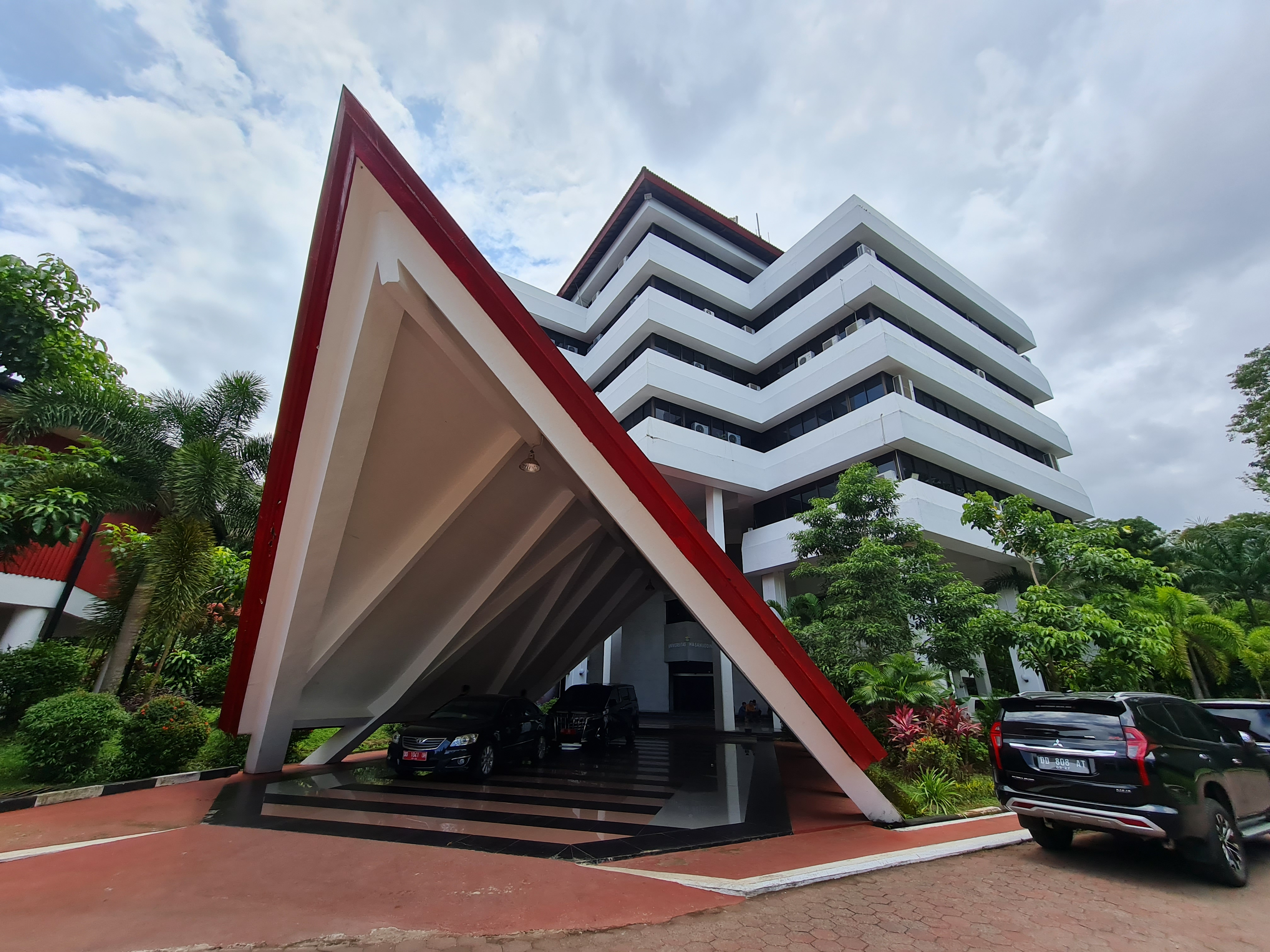
Hasanuddin University rectorate campus

Makassar has the following universities:

- State University of Makassar
- Hasanuddin University
- Alauddin Islamic State University

In 2007, the city government began requiring all skirts of schoolgirls to be below the knee.

== International relations ==
=== Consulates ===
Makassar hosts several consulates and general consulates from foreign countries, such as:

- Australia
- Germany
- Japan
- Czech Republic
- Switzerland
- France

=== Twin towns – sister cities ===
Makassar is twinned with:

- Kuala Terengganu, Malaysia
- Lismore, Australia
- Peshawar, Pakistan
- Qingdao, China

== See also ==
- Makassar metropolitan area
- List of twin towns and sister cities in Indonesia
- Sacred Heart Cathedral, Makassar
- Okkots
