= Pattimura Stadium =

Stadium in Indonesia

- Stadion Sepakbola FKIP Penjaskes Unpatti
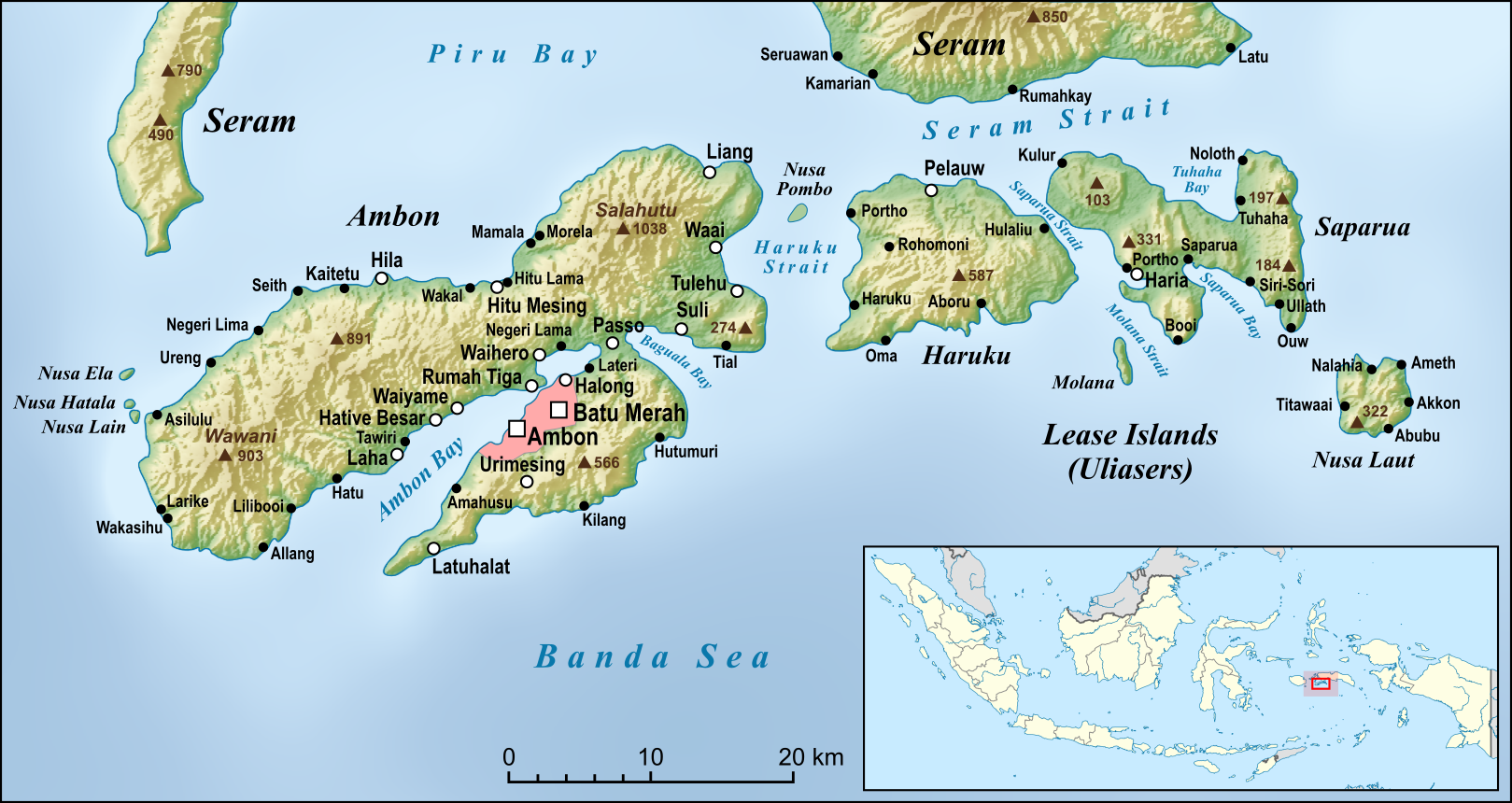
- City of Ambon shown in red, Lease Islands
- Interactive map of the Pattimura Stadium area

General information
- Type: Stadium
- Location: Ambon, Maluku, Indonesia
- Coordinates: 3°41′21″S 128°11′47″E

Pattimura Stadium is a multi-use stadium in Ambon, Maluku, Indonesia. It is currently used mostly for football matches. It holds 25,000 people, making it one of the largest stadiums in eastern Indonesia. The stadium is named after the Indonesian national hero from Maluku, Pattimura, and is located in the Pattimura University complex.
