= Louhenapessy =

Louhenapessy is a Moluccan surname. Notable people with the surname include:

- Eli Louhenapessy (born 1976), Dutch footballer
- Richard Louhenapessy (born 1955), Indonesian politician
