= Hasanuddin University =

University in Indonesia

Coordinates: 5°07′58″S 119°29′13″E

- Universitas Hasanuddin
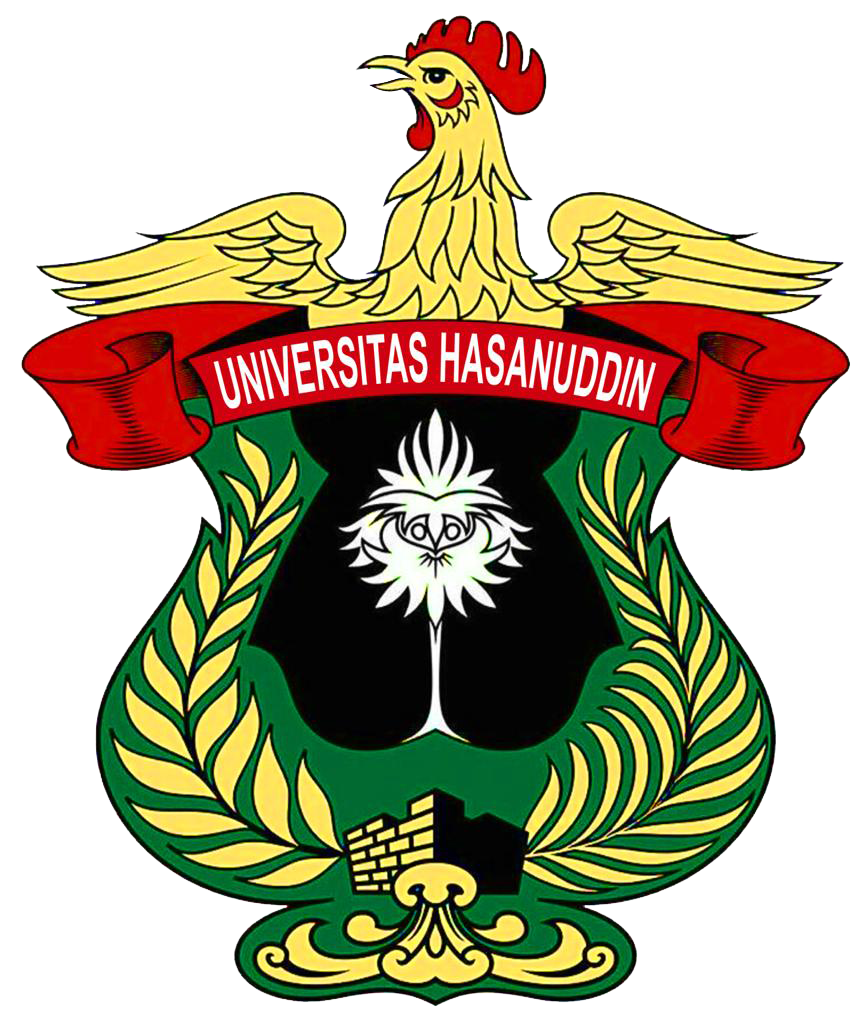
- Type: Public
- Established: 10 September 1956
- Affiliations: ASAIHL, AUAP
- Rector: Jamaluddin Jompa
- Location: Jl. Perintis Kemerdekaan Km. 10, Makassar, South Sulawesi, 90245, Indonesia
- Colors: Red
- Website: www.unhas.ac.id

Hasanuddin University (Indonesian: Universitas Hasanuddin) which is abbreviated as Unhas, is one of the largest autonomous universities in Indonesia. It is located in Makassar, South Sulawesi, Indonesia. Unhas was established on September 10, 1956, and named after Sultan Hasanuddin, a former King of the Gowa Kingdom.

== History ==
Hasanuddin University's history was begun at Makassar in 1947 as part of the Faculty of Economics of University of Indonesia based on the Decree of the Lieutenant General Governor of the Netherlands East Indies Government Number 127 dated July 23, 1947, which during the early years of its establishment had faculties scattered across the archipelago.

Due to uncertainty and chaos in Makassar and its surroundings, the faculty who previously led by L.A. Enthoven as director was suspended and then reopened again as branch of the Faculty of Economics of University of Indonesia on October 7, under the leadership of G.H.M. Riekerk. This faculty was the beginning of Hasanuddin University after being led by G.J. Wolhoff and his secretary Muhammad Baga on September 1, 1956, until the inauguration as Hasanuddin University on September 10, 1956.

University rankings

Global – Overall
- QS World: 951-1000 (2026)

Regional – Overall
- QS Asia: =236 (2025)

During the stagnation of the Faculty of Economics at the end of 1950, Nuruddin Sahadat, G.J. Wolhoff, Tjia Kok Tjiang, J.E. Tatengkeng, et al., prepared for the establishment of a private law faculty. They formed Sawerigading College Institute (Indonesian: Balai Perguruan Tinggi Sawerigading), chaired by G.J. Wolhoff until the establishment of the State University Committee (Indonesian: Panitia Pejuang Universitas Negeri) in March 1950.

On March 3, 1952, Faculty of Law and Social Knowledge was established as a branch of the law faculty of University of Indonesia with the first dean, Djokosoetono, who is also the dean of the law faculty of University of Indonesia. Then this law faculty led by C. de Heern and continued by G.H.M. Riekerk, who later separated themselves as Hasanuddin University from University of Indonesia through Government Regulation No. 23 of 1956 dated September 10, 1956.

Faculty of Medicine was formed through an agreement between Yayasan Balai Perguruan Tinggi Sawerigading and the Ministry of Education and Culture which was established in a Council of Ministers meeting on October 22, 1953. Based on the Decree, the Faculty of Medicine Preparatory Committee was formed, chaired by Syamsuddin Daeng Mangawing with Muhammad Rasyid Daeng Sirua as secretary, their members are J.E. Tatengkeng, Andi Patiwiri and Sampara Daeng Lili. On January 28, 1956, Minister of Education and Culture, R. Soewandi inaugurated the Makassar's Faculty of Medicine which later turned into the Hasanuddin University's Faculty of Medicine along with the establishment of Hasanuddin University on September 10, 1956.

Furthermore, through Decree No. 88130/S on September 8, 1960, the Faculty of Engineering was inaugurated by J. Pongrekun and Ramli Cambari Saka as his secretary with three departments, which as follows Civil, Machinery, and Naval. In 1963, the department of Electronics and Architecture was formed.

The Faculty of Literature was formed after the merger of several units of the B.1 Course Program from Yayasan Perguruan Tinggi Makassar to Hasanuddin University. This foundation is a fraction of the Sawerigading University who was led by Nuruddin Sahadat. The merger of Paedagogik B.1 Course Program, Eastern Literature and Western Literature to Hasanuddin University on November 2, 1959, became the beginning of the Faculty of Literature which was inaugurated on November 3, 1960, through a Decree of the Minister of Education and Culture No. 102248/UU/1960.

The Social and Political Faculty was inaugurated through a Decree of the Minister of Education and Culture No. A. 4692/U.U.41961 on January 30, 1961, and enforced on February 1, 1961. This faculty was a private tertiary institution named the Faculty of Civil Service (Indonesian: Fakultas Tata Praja) of the University of 17 August 1945 which was founded by Tjia Kok Tjiang with Sukamto as his secretary. Later on November 15, 1962, Sukamto was appointed as dean with Abdullah Amu as his secretary.

When Ahmad Amiruddin was a Rector, based on the Minister of Education and Culture Decree No. 0266/Q/1977 dated July 16, 1977, the Faculty of Literature was integrated into the Faculty of Social and Cultural Sciences along with the Faculty of Social and Politics Sciences and Faculty of Economy. Same thing also happened with the Faculty of Engineering and Faculty Mathematics and Natural Sciences which were integrated into the Faculty of Science and Technology. In 1983, this integration was revoked through Government Regulation No. 5/1980 followed by the Decree of the President of the Republic of Indonesia No. 68/1982.

Through collaboration with Bogor Agricultural Institute and with the demand of Arnold Mononutu, a preparatory committee for the establishment of the Faculty of Agriculture was formed, which consists of A. Azis Ressang (lecturer at the Veterinary Faculty of Bogor Agricultural Institute) and Fachruddin (expert assistant of the Faculty of Agriculture of Bogor Agricultural Institute). This collaboration resulted in a Decree of Minister of Higher Education and Science, Toyib Hadiwidjaya on August 17, 1962, and officially became the Faculty of Agriculture of Hasanuddin University.

Governor Andi Pangerang Pettarani in a meeting on March 11, 1962, appointed Aminuddin Ressang as Chairman of the Working Sub-Committee of the Establishment of the Faculty of Exact Sciences and Natural Science (FIPIA) which was officially formed based on the telegram of the Minister of Higher Education and Science on August 18, 1963, No. 59 1 BM/PTIP/63 and followed by Ministerial Decree No. 102/1963 which is valid since August 17, 1963.

In 1963, Founding Committee of the Faculty of Veterinary Medicine and Animal Husbandry (FKHP) was formed, chaired by Syamsuddin Daeng Mangawing and consisting Andi Pangerang Pettarani, Achmad Dahlan and Andi Patiwiri as members. On October 10, 1963, the Faculty of Veterinary Medicine and Animal Husbandry (FKHP) was established with a private status with Achmad Dahlan as the dean, Gaus Siregas as Assistant Dean I and Andi Baso Ronda as Assistant Dean II. On May 1, 1964, this faculty became the Faculty of Animal Husbandry of Hasanuddin University through the Decree of the Minister of Higher Education and Science (PTIP) No. 37 11964 on May 4, 1964.

Dentistry Education was established on January 23, 1969, as a result of collaboration between the university and the Indonesian Navy consists Mursalim Daeng Mamanggun, S.H., Rector of Hasanuddin University Natsir Said, and Halima Daeng Sikati and named the Dental Institute of Yos Sudarso. In 1970, this institute officially became the Department of Dentistry of Hasanuddin University and became the Faculty of Dentistry of Hasanuddin University in 1983.

The Faculty of Public Health was established on November 5, 1982, which initially only accept Diploma Three graduates and in 1987 began to receive high school graduates. This faculty was the eleventh faculty at Hasanuddin University.

As a realization of the development of Basic Scientific Pattern (Indonesian: Pola Ilmiah Pokok/PIP) as a reference for orientation of higher education institutions in Indonesia, in 1988, Hasanuddin University officially opened the Marine Science majors through the Decree of Directorate General of Higher Education (Dirjen Dikti) No. 19/Dikti/Kep/1988 on June 16, 1988. This program officially became the Faculty of Marine Science and Fisheries by integrating Fisheries majors into it based on the Decree of the Minister of Education and Culture No. 036/0/1966 on January 29, 1966.

At the 25th Dies Natalis on September 17, 1981, the President of the Republic of Indonesia, Soeharto was inaugurated the Tamalanrea Campus (Indonesian: Kampus Tamalanrea) which designed by Paddock Inc., Massachusetts, United States and was built by OD 205, Netherlands in collaboration with PT Sangkuriang Bandung on 220 Ha land area.

Over the following 60 years it developed a range of faculties and degree programs. In 2016, it rose in the list of the top 12 universities in Indonesia, to 8th place. The Minister for Research, Technology and Higher Education compiles this list based on teaching, research, facilities, student achievements and accreditation standards. In 2017, Hasanuddin University became one of several Autonomous Universities, freed from the need to seek Ministry approval for basic operations and budgetary matters. It remains as a public university until now.

== Rectors ==
Since the Minister of Education and Cultural Decree No. 3369/S dated June 11, 1956. Starting from September 1, 1956, and with Government Regulation No. 23 on September 8, 1956, Hasanuddin University was led by number of rectors, as follows:

Rectors of Hasanuddin University
No.	Rector	Years
1.	A.G. Pringgodigdo	1956-1957
2.	K.R.M.T. Djokomarsaid	1957-1960
3.	Arnold Mononutu	1960-1965
4.	Natsir Said	1965-1969
5.	A. Hafid	1969-1973
6.	Ahmad Amiruddin	1973-1982
7.	A. Hasan Walinono	1982-1984
8.	Fachruddin	1984-1989
9.	Basri Hasanuddin	1989-1997
10.	Radi A. Gany	1997-2006
11.	Idrus A. Paturusi	2006-2014
12.	Dwia Aries Tina Pulubuhu	2014–2022
13.	Jamaluddin Jompa	2022–Present

== Structure ==
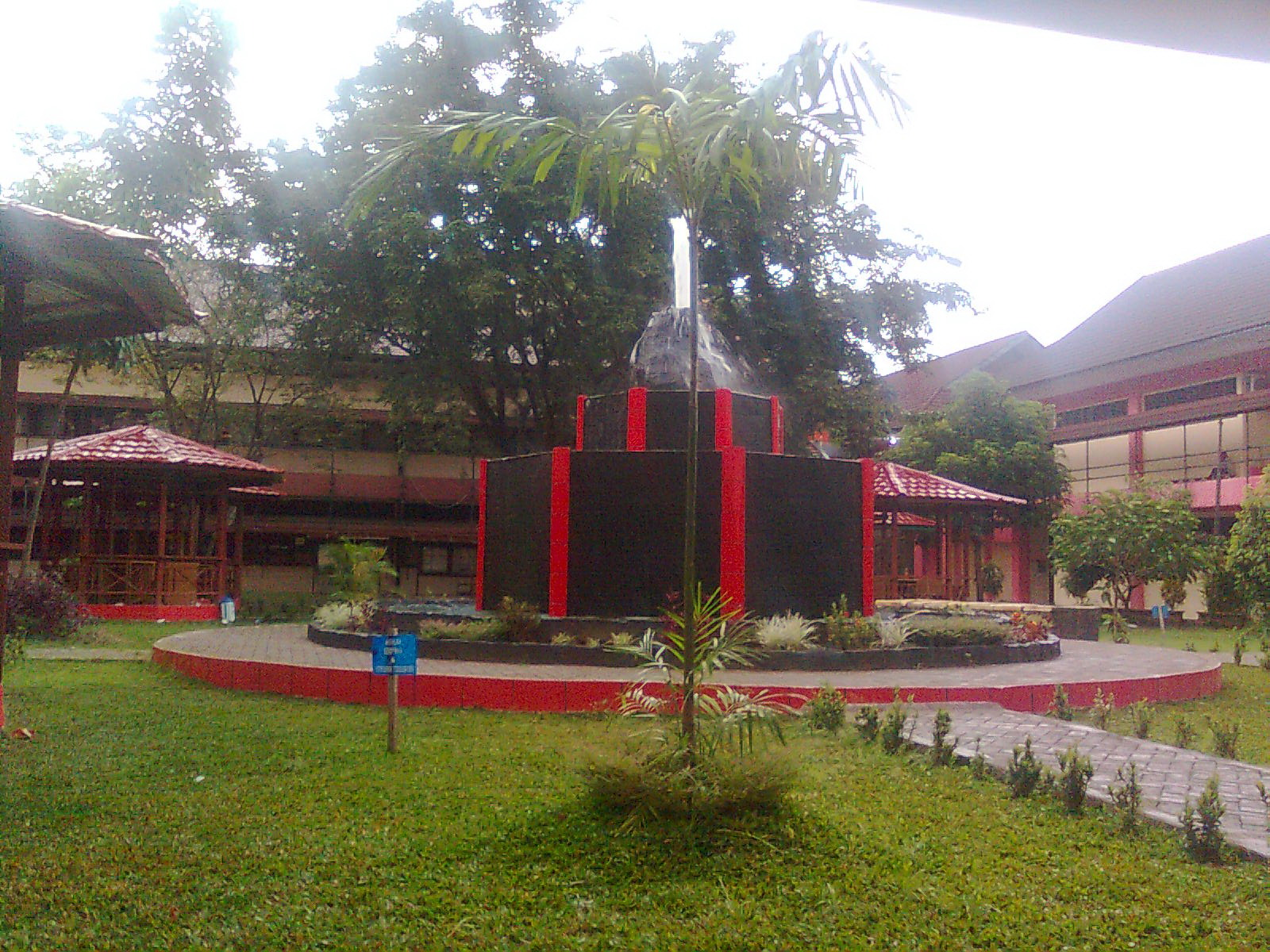
Water fountain at Unhas Faculty of Law

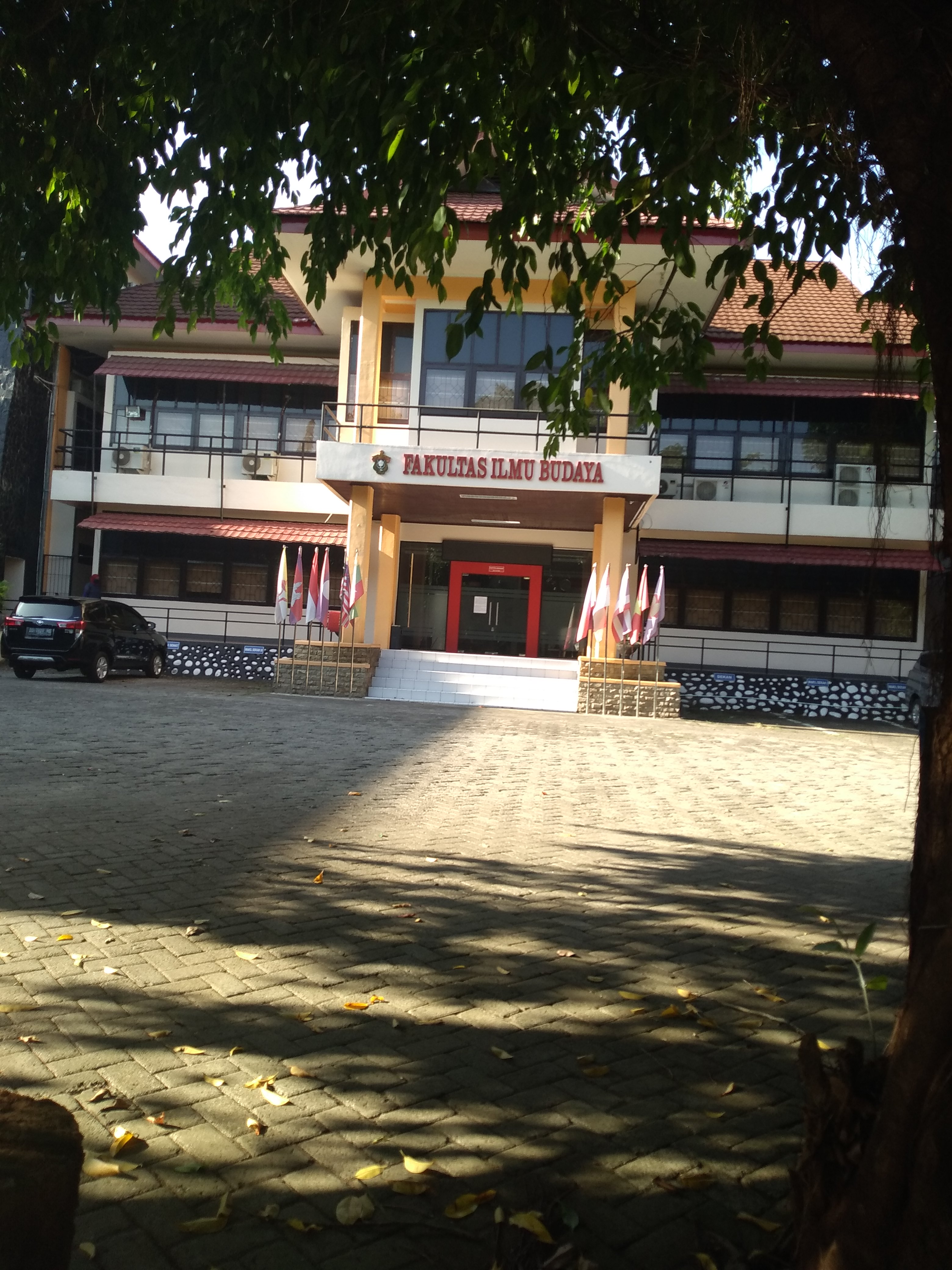
Unhas Faculty of Cultural Sciences main building

The university has 14 faculties:

- Faculty of Economics and Business
- Faculty of Law<
- Faculty of Medicine
- Faculty of Engineering
- Faculty of Social and Political Sciences
- Faculty of Cultural Sciences
- Faculty of Agriculture
- Faculty of Mathematics and Natural Sciences
- Faculty of Animal Husbandry
- Faculty of Dentistry
- Faculty of Public Health
- Faculty of Marine Science and Fishery
- Faculty of Forestry
- Faculty of Pharmacy
- Faculty of Nursing

== Alumni ==
(selection)

- Jusuf Kalla, Vice President of Indonesia
- Amran Sulaiman, Minister of Agriculture of Indonesia
- Longki Djanggola, Governor of Central Sulawesi
- Syahrul Yasin Limpo, Former Governor of South Sulawesi, Former Minister of Agriculture of Indonesia
- Agus Arifin Nu'mang, Former Vice Governor of South Sulawesi
- Mohammad Ramdhan Pomanto, Mayor of Makassar
- Hamdan Zoelva, Former Chief Justice of Constitutional Court of Indonesia
- Abraham Samad, Former Chairman of Indonesia's Corruption Eradication Commission
- Marwah Daud Ibrahim, Former Member of Parliament of People's Representative Council and Former President of Indonesian Association of Muslim Intellectuals
- Nurdin Abdullah, Former Governor of South Sulawesi
- Tanri Abeng, Former Minister of State-Owned Enterprises of Indonesia
- Muhammad Alim, Former Justice of Constitutional Court of Indonesia
- Hamid Awaludin, Former Minister of Law and Human Rights of Indonesia
- Baharuddin Lopa, Former Attorney General of Indonesia
- Hadi Mulyadi, Vice Governor of East Kalimantan
- Ilham Arief Sirajuddin, Former Mayor of Makassar
- Andi Sudirman Sulaiman, Governor of South Sulawesi
- Terawan Agus Putranto, Former Minister of Health of Indonesia
- Indira Chunda Thita Syahrul, Member of People's Representative Council
- Jimmy Demianus Ijie, Member of People's Representative Council
- Kalatiku Paembonan, Former Regent of North Toraja
- Marcus Jacob Papilaja, Former Governor of Maluku
- Sahruddin Jamal, Former Chief Minister of Johor
- Munafri Arifuddin, CEO of PSM Makassar
- Indra Yasin, Former Regent of North Gorontalo
- Ahmad Amiruddin, Former Rector of Hasanuddin University
- Ali Baal Masdar, Former Governor of West Sulawesi
- Sudirman Said, Former Minister of Energy and Mineral Resources of Indonesia
- Andi Widjajanto, Governor of National Resilience Institute of Indonesia, Former Cabinet Secretary of Indonesia
- Zainal Abidin, Former Regent of Pangkajene and Islands
- Benny Ramdhani, Head of Badan Perlindungan Pekerja Migran Indonesia
- Husain Abdullah, Former Presidential Spokesperson of Indonesia
- Muchtar Pakpahan, Former Minister of Manpower of Indonesia
- Burhanuddin, Attorney General of Indonesia
- Nico Afinta, Former Chief of East Java Regional Police
- Lukman Abunawas, Vice Governor of Southeast Sulawesi
- Ridwan Bae, Member of People's Representative Council, Former Regent of Muna
- Saleh Lasata, Former Vice Governor of Southeast Sulawesi
- Muhammad Jusuf, Former Chief of South Sulawesi Regional Police
- Salim S. Sayyid, Former Regent of Pangkajene and Islands
- Ali Mochtar Ngabalin, Presidential Special Staff of Indonesia
- Andi Mallarangeng, Former Minister of Youth and Sports of Indonesia
- Husain Abdullah, Former Presidential Spokesperson of Indonesia
- Syahrul Yasin Limpo, Former Minister of Agriculture of Indonesia
- Taufik Pasiak, Expert Staff at Ministry of Health of Indonesia
- Nur Mahmudi Ismail, Former Minister of Forestry of Indonesia, Former Mayor of Depok
- Syamsuar, Governor of Riau
- Ali Baal Masdar, Former Governor of West Sulawesi
- Ali Mazi, Former Governor of Southeast Sulawesi
- Aksa Mahmud, Businessman and Former Deputy Speaker of Regional Representative Council
- Samsu Rizal, Member of People's Representative Council
- La Ode Syarif, Former Deputy Chairman of Indonesia's Corruption Eradication Commission
- Sarmila Sidiq, Member of People's Representative Council
- Nurdin Halid, Former Chairman of Indonesian Football Association
- Rukka Sombolinggi, Secretary General of Aliansi Masyarakat Adat Nusantara
