= Marcus Jacob Papilaja =

Indonesian politician

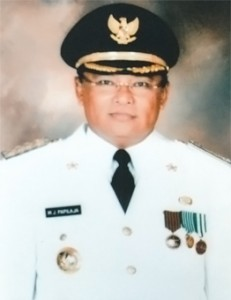
- Official portrait as mayor

Mayor of Ambon
- In office 2001–2011
- Preceded by: Chris Tanasale
- Succeeded by: Richard Louhenapessy

Speaker of Ambon DPRD
- In office 1999–2001

Personal details
- Born: 22 September 1954 (age 70); Central Maluku, Indonesia
- Political party: PDI-P

Marcus Jacob Papilaja (born 22 September 1954) is an Indonesian academic and politician of the Indonesian Democratic Party of Struggle who served as the mayor of Ambon, Maluku for two terms between 2001 and 2011. His mayoral tenure began as the Maluku sectarian conflict wracked Ambon, and he contributed to the reconciliation between Muslim and Christian groups in the city. He was sentenced for corruption in 2014, and was imprisoned for one year.

== Early life and education ==
Papilaja was born in Suli, in Ambon Island but part of Central Maluku Regency, on 22 September 1954. He studied at an elementary school in Suli, then at economic middle and high schools in Ambon City. He graduated from high school in 1973 and later received a bachelor's degree in economics from University of Pattimura in 1978. He received another bachelors, in accounting, from Makassar's Hasanuddin University in 1982. He later also received a master's in accounting from Gadjah Mada University and a doctorate from the Bogor Agricultural Institute.

== Career ==
Papilaja began lecturing at Pattimura in 1982, and continued to do so until 2010. He also lectured at the Indonesian Christian University Maluku and at Pelita Harapan University. In 1999, Papilaja was elected into Ambon's Regional House of Representatives (DPRD) as an Indonesian Democratic Party of Struggle member, becoming the speaker of the legislature. In 2001, the DPRD elected him as mayor, with United Development Party legislator Syarief Hadler as deputy.

Ambon was suffering from religious violence as Papilaja was sworn into office, as part of the ongoing sectarian conflict in the province. In order to end the violence, Papilaja met national leaders, foreign NGO representatives and United Nations officials to involve them in the peace process. Within the city government, he pushed for Muslim and Christian employees to mix – due to prior violence, employees had been self-segregating on religious lines. Another policy of Papilaja was to establish ad hoc markets guarded by security officers to replace markets which were destroyed in the violence, which also promoted commercial activity across religious lines. With the help of the Ministry of Home Affairs. Papilaja also approached Jafar Umar Thalib, commander of the Muslim militia Laskar Jihad active in Ambon. By 2002, Papilaja had managed to convince Thalib to accept the Malino II Accord and to disband Laskar Jihad in exchange for guarantees that Christians would not attack Muslim neighborhoods.

Papilaja also introduced fit and proper tests for leadership positions in the city government, reducing accusations of preferences in the selection of officials. As the situation in Ambon calmed down, the city government began to take part in the development of regions of Ambon Island outside the city's jurisdiction. It also sponsored sports events to improve interreligious relations and repatriated refugees who had fled the city. Papilaja was reelected for a second term in the direct mayoral election of 2006, winning 52,195 votes (36.1%) in a four-way race. Richard Louhenapessy was elected to replace him in 2011.

During the 2009 presidential election, Papilaja joined the campaign team of Susilo Bambang Yudhoyono, against PDI-P's candidate Megawati Sukarnoputri.

== Post-mayoralship ==
Papilaja was arrested by the provincial police in December 2012 under charges of corruption related to a municipal purchase of burial land. He was sentenced to one year in prison on 28 October 2014 by the Ambon District Court. He remained active in Ambonese politics, campaigning for a candidate in the 2017 mayoral election. He also continued to lecture, moving to Matana University in Tangerang in 2016.

== Personal life ==
Papilaja is married to Risakotta, and the couple has two children. Papilaja is a Protestant Christian, and a member of the Protestant Church of Maluku. He is also active in the Indonesian Amateur Boxers' Association.
