= Chris Tanasale =

Indonesian former politician and military officer

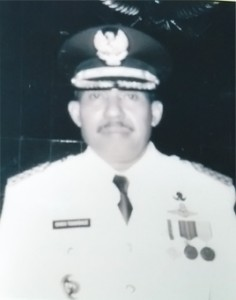
- Official portrait as mayor

Mayor of Ambon
- In office 1996–2001
- Preceded by: Johanes Sudijono
- Succeeded by: Marcus Jacob Papilaja

Member of Maluku DPRD
- In office 1992–1996

Military service
- Branch/service: Indonesian Army
- Rank: Colonel

Chris Tanasale is an Indonesian former politician and military officer who served as the mayor of Ambon, Maluku between 1996 and 2001. He served in the Indonesian Army and reached the rank of colonel, and was appointed into Maluku's Regional House of Representatives in 1992 as an army representative.

His selection as mayor by governor Akib Latuconsina in 1996 was a compromise. Latuconsina, a Muslim, sought to appoint a Muslim military officer to the position to replace the previous mayor Johanes Sudijono, but Indonesian Democratic Party representatives in Ambon's city council resisted and sought to retain Sudijono. Latuconsina relented and chose Tanasale, a Christian military officer, to prevent alienating Christians in the city.

Both the fall of Suharto and the outbreak of sectarian violence in Maluku occurred during his tenure, with the city of Ambon experiencing a sharp rise in unemployment. As the conflict spread throughout Maluku and Ambon, refugees flooded into Ambon and occupied abandoned shops which had been damaged by the fighting. The city government under Tanasale experienced a drop in revenues, and rehabilitation efforts were hindered by lack of communication with the provincial government. According to a report by the Diocese of Amboinia, the city government under Tanasale sponsored a market day in Ambon to promote meetings between Muslims and Christians, but the market quickly descended into stone-throwing and fighting.

He was not reelected by the legislature for a second term in 2001, being defeated in a vote by Marcus Jacob Papilaja. In 2003, he unsuccessfully ran as Vice Governor of Maluku in a legislature vote, receiving none of the 36 votes cast. In 2015, he was elected for a five-year term as chairman of the Maluku veteran's association.
