= Jimmy Demianus Ijie =

Indonesian politician (1968–2021)

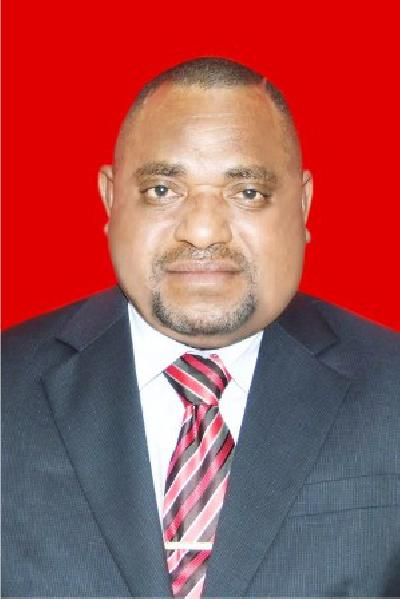

Member of the Indonesian House of Representatives
- In office 2019–2021

Personal details
- Born: 21 March 1968 Fategomi, Aitinyo Utara district, Maybrat Regency
- Died: 23 July 2021 (aged 53)
- Party: Indonesian Democratic Party - Struggle

Jimmy Demianus Ijie (21 March 1968 – 23 July 2021) was an Indonesian politician from Southwest Papua.

== Biography ==
He was a member of the Indonesian House of Representatives from the Indonesian Democratic Party - Struggle (PDI-P). He was elected in 2019 from the West Papua electoral district with 66,555 votes.

He was born in Fategomi, Aitinyo Utara district, Maybrat Regency where he attended elementary school. In 1993, he graduated from Hasanuddin University in dentistry. In 2007, he completed a second bachelor in law at Jakarta University. He was working for the Center for Human Rights Education and Information in Jakarta from 1993 to 1999. From 2004 to 2014, he was working as a chairperson at the Regional People's Legislative Assembly.

During a parliamentary meeting in October 2019, he cried while stating that the politics of Jakarta have forgotten the issues of Papua, referring to the 2019 Papua protests, which have displaced thousands and resulted in 32 deaths. He died at the age of 53 on 23 July 2021 due to COVID-19.
