= Richard Louhenapessy =

Indonesian politician (born 1955)

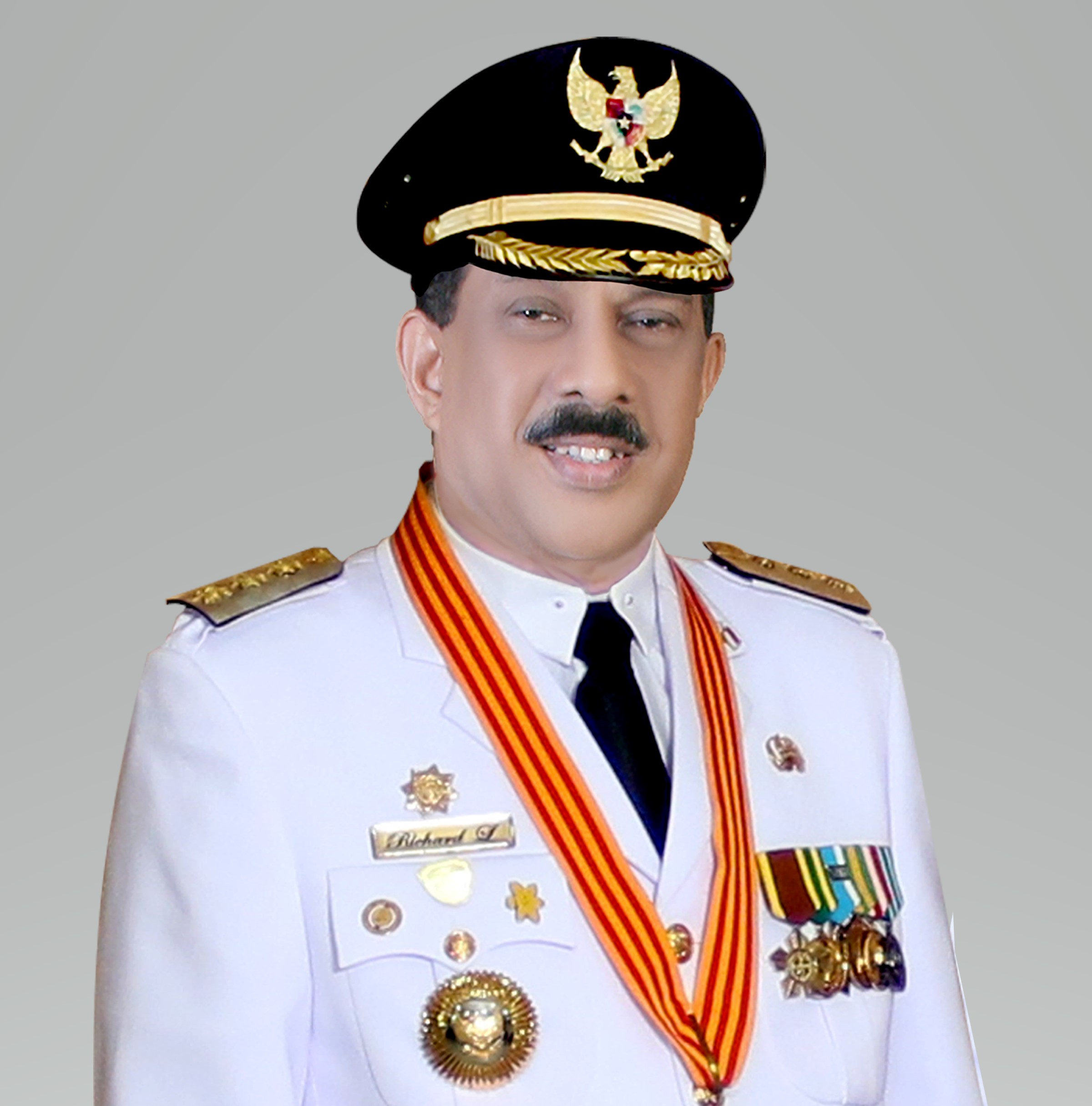
- Official portrait

Mayor of Ambon
- In office 22 May 2017 – 13 May 2022
- Preceded by: Frans Johanis Papilaya (act.)
- Succeeded by: Bodewin Wattimena (act.)
- In office 4 August 2011 – 4 August 2016
- Preceded by: Marcus Jacob Papilaja
- Succeeded by: Frans Johanis Papilaya (act.)

Personal details
- Born: 20 April 1955 (age 70) Ambon, Maluku, Indonesia
- Party: Golkar

Richard Louhenapessy (born 20 April 1955) is an Indonesian former politician of the Golkar party who was the mayor of Ambon, Maluku for two terms between 2011–2016 and 2017–2022. Near the end of his tenure in 2022, he was arrested by the Corruption Eradication Commission for receiving bribes and was sentenced to five years in prison. Prior to becoming mayor, he had been elected four times into the provincial legislature between 1992 and 2009.

== Early and personal life ==
Richard Louhenapessy was born in the city of Ambon, Maluku on 20 April 1955. He studied in Christian schools in Ambon, graduating from Xaverius High School in 1973. He would receive his bachelor's in law from Pattimura University in 1985. He had been a member of Pattimura's student organization during his time there between 1976 and 1980, and had also joined the National Committee of Indonesian Youth. He married Leberina Louisa Evelin Maatita, with whom he fathered five children. He is a Protestant Christian.

== Career ==
He began to work as a lawyer in 1978, before he graduated from Pattimura. By 1988, he had joined Golkar, and became head of the party's youth organization in Ambon. He was first elected into Maluku's regional legislature (DPRD) in 1992, serving until 1997. In 1999, he was again elected into the DPRD as leader of Golkar's parliamentary group there, and in 2004 became the legislature speaker. In 2006, Louhenapessy took part in Ambon's first mayoral election, and placed second of five candidate pairs with 40,167 votes (27.8%), losing to incumbent mayor Marcus Jacob Papilaja. He was elected for his fourth term in the DPRD in 2009.

Louhenapessy ran again in the next mayoral election in 2011, and won the election after securing 37% of the votes. He was sworn into office on 4 August 2011. His first term expired on 4 August 2016, and head of the city's trade and industry bureau Frans Yohanes Papilaya was appointed acting mayor to replace Louhenapessy. Louhenapessy ran for a second term in the 2017 mayoral election, and was elected with 82,307 votes (54.65%). His second term began on 22 May 2017.

During his tenure, he promoted Ambon as a "City of Music". He joked that an affinity for music is "part of Ambonese DNA".

== Arrest ==
The Corruption Eradication Commission (KPK) announced Louhenapessy as a suspect for a bribery case on 13 May 2022. KPK had previously issued an order for Louhenapessy to come to KPK's office in Jakarta, and as he did not come citing a surgery, KPK arrested him. On 9 February 2023, the Ambon District Court sentenced him to five years in prison for receiving bribes, and the Supreme Court of Indonesia upheld his prison sentence upon appeal by KPK. The Supreme Court also reduced restitution payments from Louhenapessy from Rp 8 billion (~USD 530,000) to Rp 520 million (~USD 35,000). As mayor of Ambon, he was replaced in an acting capacity by his deputy Syarif Hadler on 14 May, and as Hadler's tenure expired on 22 May, he was further replaced by City Secretary Agus Ririmasse on 22 May. Ririmasse was replaced two days later by Ministry of Home Affairs appointee Bodewin Wattimena.
