= Kalatiku Paembonan =

Indonesian politician (1953–2024)

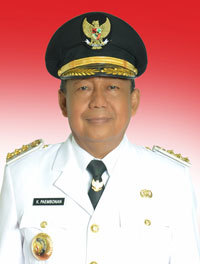

Regent of North Toraja
- In office 31 March 2016 – 31 March 2021
- Preceded by: Frederik Batti Sorring
- Succeeded by: Yohanis Bassang

Personal details
- Born: 16 November 1953 Rantepao, North Toraja, Indonesia
- Died: 8 August 2024 (aged 70) Jakarta, Indonesia
- Party: Indonesian Democratic Party of Struggle
- Education: Hasanuddin University; University of Indonesia; Padjadjaran University

Kalatiku Paembonan (16 November 1953 – 8 August 2024) was an Indonesian politician, bureaucrat, and lecturer who served as the Regent of North Toraja from 2016 to 2021. Before entering politics, Kalatiku worked in the Department of Home Affairs and held several high-ranking positions in the department. He then became a lecturer at the Institute of Public Governance before resigning to stand in the North Toraja regency election.

== Early life and education ==
Paembonan was born on 16 November 1953, in Rantepao, North Toraja. He completed his basic education at the Malango Christian Primary School in 1965, the Rantepao Junior High School in 1969, and the Takalar State High School in 1972. Upon completing high school, Kalatiku moved to Makassar and studied economics at the Hasanuddin University in Makassar (then Ujungpandang), graduating in 1981. During his time in the university, Kalatiku was active in student government, where he became the deputy chair of the student's council and the chairman of Makassar's branch of the Indonesian Christian Student Movement.

Paembonan earned his master's degree in administration and public policy from the University of Indonesia during his civil service career. His thesis discussed the development of civil servants in the regional management of the Sukabumi city government. He received his doctorate from the Padjadjaran University in 2013.

== Career ==
Paembonan began his tenure in the department in 1983 and was assigned to its training and education body. For the first two years, he served as the Indonesian counterpart consultant for the Planning and Development Collaborative (PADCO) program of the United States Agency for International Development in Indonesia. He also taught courses on regional planning and project management systems, higher leadership and advanced leadership courses.

From 1987 to 1992, Paembonan was appointed to head the evaluation subsection in the department's training and education body. During this period, Kalatiku became the project manager of several governance training programs. He briefly became the acting chief for regional management in the Center for Government Development for a year before being promoted to the chief of financial affairs in the training and education body. In 1995, Kalatiku was nominated for the Regent of Tana Toraja. He received six votes and lost the election to Tarsis Kodrat, spokesperson of the Sulawesi military command.

Upon receiving his master's degree in 2000, Paembonan was promoted to the head of the functional training center in the department. Around this period, a civil servant from the South Sulawesi religion office claimed that ninety percent of Torajan women had lost their virginity. Paembonan, along with Torajan advocates Micha Lumilling and Duma Barrung, were entrusted by Torajans in Jakarta to form an advocacy group and sue the civil servant.

A year later, he was transferred to the directorate general of community development as director for community training in 2001 and the director for community economic enterprises in 2002. In the same year, he was appointed the secretary of the directorate general, the second highest position in the directorate general. He retired in 2010 and began lecturing at the Institute of Public Governance.

== Political career ==
In 2010, Paembonan ran for the Regent of North Toraja, with Alfrita Pasande Danduru as his running mate. He received support from the Christian-based Prosperous Peace Party and six other non-parliamentary parties. Paembonan failed to proceed to the second round of the election as he did not receive more than thirty percent of the vote.

Paembonan ran again for the Regent of North Toraja in the 2015 local election, with Papuan-based businessman Yosia Rinto Kadang as his running mate. Paembonan managed to secure support for his candidacy from the Indonesian Democratic Party of Struggle. Paembonan won the election with a total of 71,120 votes (54.2% of the total number of votes).

Paembonan attempted to secure a second term as regent with physician Etha Rimba Tandi Payung as his running mate. He received support from his party, Indonesian Democratic Party of Struggle, as well as Gerindra Party, Perindo Party, and Indonesian Justice and Unity Party. He placed second in the election with 52,706 votes, or 38.4% of the total votes. In the 2024 Indonesian general election, Paembonan ran as a candidate for the House of Representatives from the South Sulawesi III electoral district but failed to secure enough votes for a seat.

== Personal life and death ==
Paembonan was married to Linda Christine and had a child named Rannusary Paembonan. Paembonan was a Protestant Christian.

Paembonan died at the Agung Hospital in Manggarai, Tebet, Jakarta, on 8 August 2024, at the age of 70.
