= Rukka Sombolinggi =

Indonesian human rights activist

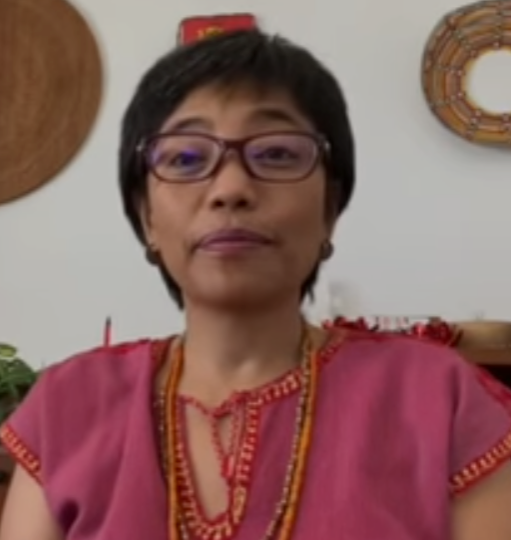
- In a 2023 video
- Education: Hasanuddin University (BSc) Chulalongkorn University (MA)
- Employer: Aliansi Masyarakat Adat Nusantara
- Known for: Human rights activism, indigenous rights activism
- Awards: 2023 Skoll Award for Social Innovation

Rukka Sombolinggi is an Indonesian human rights activist. A member of the Torajan people, she has been the secretary general of the Aliansi Masyarakat Adat Nusantara (AMAN), an indigenous rights organisation, since 2017.

== Early life and education ==
Sombolinggi was raised in the highlands of South Sulawesi, Indonesia, in a Torajan family. Her grandfather and great-grandfather had been members of the Indonesian independence movement, while her parents were indigenous rights activists; Sombolinggi has since called for greater recognition of the role of indigenous people in the anti-colonial struggle in Indonesia.

Sombolinggi graduated with a bachelor's degree in agriculture from Hasanuddin University in Makassar. She went on to obtain a master's degree in political science from Chulalongkorn University in Bangkok, Thailand.

== Activism ==
Sombolinggi started her activism as a member of the Network of Defenders of the Rights of Indigenous Peoples (Indonesian: Jaringan Pembela Hak-Hak Masyarakat Adat, JAPHAMA), a network of indigenous human rights activists founded in 1993. In 1999, Sombolinggi was a JAPHAMA delegate at the first congress of Indonesian indigenous peoples; the meeting led to the establishment of the Aliansi Masyarakat Adat Nusantara (lit. 'Indigenous Peoples' Alliance of Nusantara', AMAN) that same year, of which Sombolinggi became a member. The organisation represents 18 million indigenous people in Indonesia, across 2366 distinct communities, making it the world's largest national-level indigenous organisation.

In 2005, Sombolinggi produced the film Standing Strong on the Tsunami Ruins, a documentary following indigenous communities in Aceh impacted by the 2004 Indian Ocean earthquake and tsunami.

In 2007, Sombolinggi left AMAN to work as a programme specialist at the United Nations Development Programme's Indigenous People's Programme at the UNDP Asia-Pacific Regional Centre in Bangkok. In 2011, she returned to Indonesia and to AMAN, working as a project manager. In 2017, Sombolinggi was elected to serve as AMAN's first female general secretary; she was re-elected in 2021, and remains its leader as of July 2026.

In 2022, Sombolinggi became the co-president of the Global Alliance for Territorial Communities, a worldwide network of indigenous networks working to protect forests and promote solutions to climate change based on indigenous practices.

== Views ==
Sombolinggi has become known for her support and advocacy of indigenous communities, and the broader Nusantara area, which covers Malaysia, the Philippines, and Timor-Leste. She has called for indigenous voices to be heard in all spheres of society, including within the media, where she believes more indigenous journalists would help challenge stereotypes and ensure indigenous people are able to tell their own stories. Sombolinggi has said that building trust between the government, corporations and indigenous communities was critical to make meaningful partnerships.

Sombolinggi has called for indigenous concepts of collectives, solidarity, and reciprocity to be embraced by Indonesian authorities and companies. She has criticised the absence of consideration of indigenous communities and voices in decision-making, particularly in relation to ancestral lands. Sombolinggi raised concerns in 2026 that the Indonesian government's granting of green energy deals, including the construction of electric vehicle factories and dams on indigenous lands, occurred without consultation of the communities living there. She is a proponent of the Indigenous Peoples Bill, first introduced in 2012 by Joko Widodo as a priority legislation, that would "prevent ancestral lands from being turned into a red carpet for investment" by granting a legal foundation for challenging agrarian disputes concerning indigenous land; conflicts over customary indigenous territories; and violations of indigenous rights. Sombolinggi believed the situation had worsened following decentralisation in 2001, which gave the power to decide what was built on indigenous lands to various regents and governors who often did not consult community leaders. The bill was not passed during Widodo's tenure as President of Indonesia and remains a draft law under the presidency of Prabowo Subianto; Sombolinggi has stated that under Subianto's rule, plantations that had previously been considered illegal due to their construction on indigenous lands had subsequently been authorised by his Forest Area Enforcement Task Force.

== Recognition ==
In 2023, Sombolinggi accepted the 2023 Skoll Award for Social Innovation on behalf of AMAN, including its mapping of indigenous territories and lobbying of the Indonesian government. Under her leadership, ASAN invested in the use of technology, including mobile phones, the internet and communication services to link remote communities. Sombolinggi has credited this for making indigenous communities better prepared to respond to threats, as well as to make ASAN more appealing to young indigenous people.
