= Aliansi Masyarakat Adat Nusantara =

Indonesian indigenous peoples' advocacy organization

Indigenous Peoples' Alliance of Nusantara (Aliansi Masyarakat Adat Nusantara, abbreviated as AMAN) is an Indonesian indigenous peoples' human rights and advocacy organization founded in 1999. AMAN has established 21 Regional Chapters (PW) and 114 Regional Chapters (PD) in 33 provinces. AMAN currently comprises 2,272 indigenous communities with an estimated population of over 15 million people.

AMAN is officially registered in with the Indonesian Department of Justice and Human Rights as an Organizations Alliance under the Notary Act No. 26, H. Abu Yusuf, SH and Deed of Establishment on 24 April 2001. As of 2017, its general secretary is Rukka Sombolinggi.

== History ==
Aliansi Masyarakat Adat Nusantara (AMAN) was first declared in 1999 during the initial Kongres Masyarakat Adat Nusantara (KMAN I) in Jakarta. The event was a significant milestone in the history of indigenous peoples movement in Indonesia. The founding was a response to a growing from the mid-1980s awareness among non-governmental organizations (NGOs) and social scientists about a wide variety of the negative impacts on the development to indigenous communities in Indonesia. Repression to Indigenous Peoples under the Suharto New Order regime in various issues, i.e. economic development, political, legal, health, social, cultural and education.

From the mid-1980s onwards, Indigenous resistance against government policies began to appear sporadically. These situations arouse the concern of many social movement activists and academics on the conditions faced by indigenous peoples in various communities in the country since the 1990s. In 1993, the Network of Defender of the Rights of Indigenous Peoples (Jaringan Pembela Hak-Hak Masyarakat Adat - JAPHAMA) was founded by indigenous leaders, academics, legal assistances and social movement activists in South Sulawesi Toraja. The presence of JAPHAMA was also in response to the growing of Indigenous rights movement on the global level.

The JAPHAMA meeting also discussed and agreed on the term Indigenous Peoples in Indonesia context as “Masyarakat Adat”. The use of the term is a form of resistance to the terms attached to the Indigenous Peoples that is abusive, such as outcast tribe, forest dwellers communities, wild swiddeners, primitive, obstacles to development, etc. which are violating the constitutional rights of Indigenous Peoples to be treated with the same rights as citizens of Indonesia. Through JAPHAMA, the customary leaders and the various other elements consolidated the idea of Indigenous Peoples and identified of common goals. Customary leaders were then get support from various activists and NGOs with different backgrounds i.e. environmental, anti-globalization, agrarian reform, legal assistances, cultural activists and others to jointly realize the implementation of the Congress of Indigenous Peoples when there was a momentum for reformation in Indonesia.

On March 17 to 22, 1999, for the first time, Congress of Indigenous Peoples of the Archipelago (KMAN - hereinafter referred as KMAN I) was held at the Hotel Indonesia in Jakarta. KMAN I was attended by over 400 Indigenous leaders from all over the Indonesian archipelago, women and men. The congress discussed the problems that threaten the existence of indigenous peoples from various aspects such as human rights violations; expropriation of land, territories and resources; harassment of customs and culture; as well as policy development that deliberately marginalize Indigenous Peoples. KMAN I also discussed and agreed on the vision, mission, principles, program outlines and goals of the movement. KMAN I produced a Basic View of the Congress of Indigenous Peoples in 1999 on "The Indigenous Peoples Position to the State" which strongly confirms that Indigenous Peoples had already existed before the state, is therefore "Should the State not recognizing us, then we will not recognize the State." KMAN I also established a working definition for indigenous communities as "community that inhabit an ancestral domain from generation to generation, have sovereignty over their land and natural resources, of which social and culture regulated by customary law and institution maintaining the peoples’ sustainability.” KMAN I also laid the foundation of gender equality in the Indigenous Peoples movement. KMAN I set the formation of the Indigenous Peoples’ Alliance of the Archipelago (AMAN) as an organization for Indigenous Peoples movement in Indonesia. Since then, the date of March 17 was celebrated as the Day of the Resurrection of Indigenous Peoples of the Archipelago (Hari Kebangkitan Masyarakat Adat Nusantara - HKMAN) and simultaneously, the birthday of AMAN.

At the beginning period of its formation 1999–2003, the AMAN's Council is the organization's highest decision-making body under KMAN. AMAN's Council consist of 54 indigenous leaders-representing 27 provinces, each one male and one female. AMAN Council then selects and defines three among themselves as the council's Coordinator of AMAN, representing western, central and eastern part of Indonesia. Council's Coordinator, in addition to its main task of coordinating the members of AMAN's Council in their respective territories, are also responsible for issuing policy directives and at the same time monitoring the Executive Secretary in daily organizing of AMAN National Secretariat. AMAN members at that time consisted of Indigenous Communities and the Indigenous Peoples Organization (Organisasi Masyarakat Adat - OMA).

AMAN's organizational structure continued to evolve in accordance with the aspirations and needs of its members and to respond to various challenges, both at the national and regional levels as well as developments at the global level. The most significant changes occurred in KMAN III in Pontianak, West Kalimantan in 2007. KMAN III decided and determined that AMAN to be led by a Secretary General to implement mandates given by the organization. In carrying out responsibilities, the Secretary General would be accompanied by the National Council (Dewan AMAN Nasional - DAMANNAS) delegates from 27 provinces, each consisting of one male and one female. They were selected and assigned in KMAN III. DAMANNAS then choose 7 Region Coordinators for the Region of Sumatra, Borneo, Java, Bali, Nusa Tenggara, Sulawesi, Maluku and Papua.

The leadership at the national level is called Central Governing Body (Pengurus Besar - PB) of AMAN. While the regional and local levels are respectively led by AMAN's Regional Chapter (Pengurus Wilayah AMAN or PW AMAN), equal of a province or bigger areas based on cultural identity and AMAN's Local Chapter (Pengurus Daerah AMAN or PD AMAN), equal of a district or bigger areas based on cultural identity. Each of which is composed of Regional Daily Governing Body/Executive (Badan Pengurus Harian - BPH) and Local Governing Body/Executive, together with Regional Council (DAMANWIL) and Local Council (DAMANDA) as advisors and supervisors. Moreover, the membership system had changed as well. KMAN III decided that AMAN previously consisting of indigenous communities and organizations would be solely composed of indigenous communities. Indigenous peoples’ organizations previously registered as AMAN's members were dissolved and mandated to adopt with the structures decided by KMAN III by becoming PW AMAN and PD AMAN.

KMAN IV was held in April 2012 in Tobelo, North Halmahera of North Maluku. At KMAN IV, there were changes made in the composition of DAMANNAS which was originally made up of 54 representatives from 27 provinces, led by 7 Regional Coordinators by eliminating the provincial representatives into 2 regional representatives only. The provincial representatives then serve as Regional Council in AMAN Regional Chapters. Until now, DAMANNAS consists of 14 indigenous leaders, one male and one female, both representing each of 7 regional division of AMAN's working areas, Sumatra, Borneo, Java, Bali, Nusa Tenggara, Sulawesi, Maluku and Papua. DAMANNAS selected by each region, and assigned in KMAN IV.

== Programs ==
To perform its function as an organization for Indigenous Peoples movement in Indonesia, AMAN programs established according to the needs of service to its members. The programs include:

1. Advocacy, Human Rights and Politics:
  - Lobbying, intervention and pushing for law or legislation, regulations and agreements at the national level; Local Regulation, Decision Letters etc. at the local level to recognize the rights of Indigenous Peoples.
  - Providing legal services and cases handling to AMAN's members who involve in legal conflicts related to their collective rights.
  - Encouraging the expansion of Indigenous Peoples political participation.
  - Lobbying and interventions in various global forums and international agreements
2. Strengthening the Organization and Institutional Building
  - Strengthening the capacity of the organizational management and operational, as well as capacity building for AMAN members and its cadres; organizational development at every level; strengthening information and communication including developing of community media; mobilization of public resources.
3. Community Service and Support
  - Mapping of indigenous territories; community economic empowerment; developing renewable energy resources; disaster management; developing Indigenous Peoples’ cooperative producers; developing community-owned enterprises; development of culture and education; developing indigenous based forestry.
