= University of Pattimura =

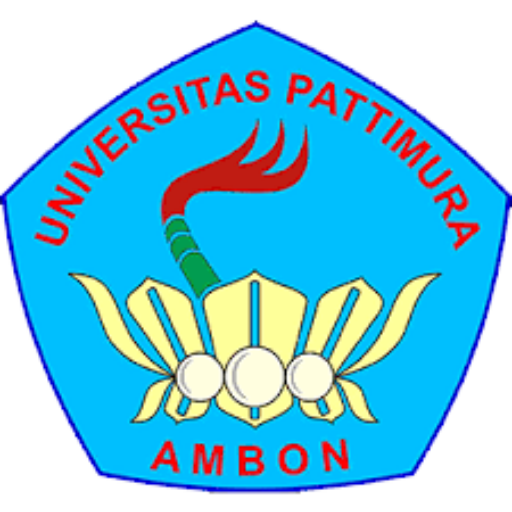
- Coat of Arms of Pattimura University
- Motto: “Hotumese”, berkembang dalam tantangan.
- Motto in English: “Hotumese”, thrives on challenges.
- Type: State College
- Established: 20 July 1955 (As West Irian Maluku Higher Education Foundation); 1 August 1962 (As State University); 23 April 1963 (As Patimura University)
- Founders: Joseph Batitsta Sitanala
- Parent institution: Ministry of Education, Culture, Research and Technology
- Affiliations: ASAIHL
- Rector: Prof. Dr. Fredy Leiwakabessy, M.Pd
- First Chancellor: L. Nanlohy
- Students: ±11,786
- Location: Ambon, Maluku, Indonesia; 3°39′16.06″S 128°11′44.4″E
- Campus: Urban, 750,000 square meters
- Colors: Light Blue
- Nickname: Unpatti, Basudara Campus
- Mascot: Kapitan Pattimura
- Website: www.unpatti.ac.id
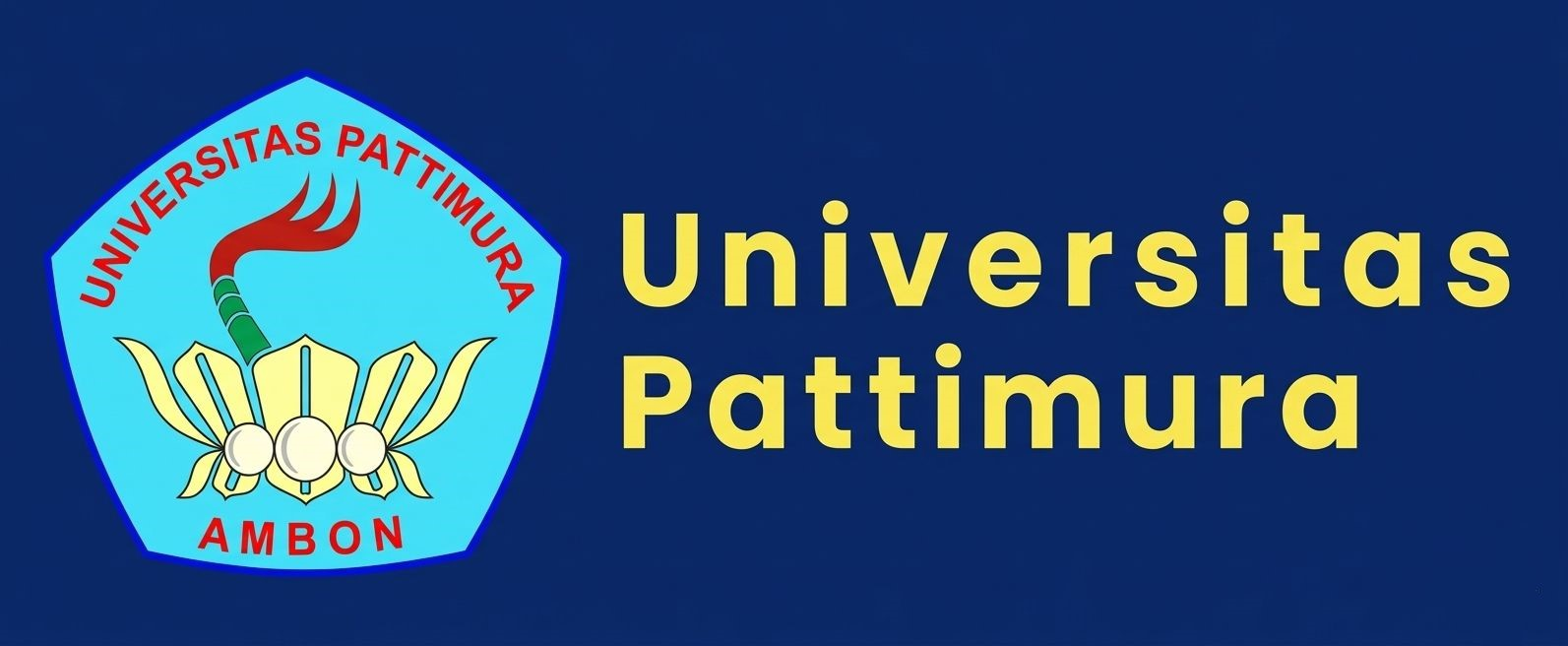

University of Pattimura (Indonesian: Universitas Pattimura) is a public university in Ambon, Maluku, Indonesia. It was established on April 23, 1963. Its current rector is F. Leiwakabessy. Universitas Pattimura, abbreviated as Unpatti, is the oldest public university in Maluku Province, Indonesia, headquartered in Poka, Ambon City. The institution officially became a public university on 1 August 1962 based on the Decree of the Minister of Higher Education and Science (PTIP) Number 99 of 1962, and was later formally established under the name Universitas Pattimura through Presidential Decree Number 66 of 1963 on 23 April 1963. Since the end of 2023, Universitas Pattimura has been led by Prof. Dr. Fredy Leiwakabessy, M.Pd. as Rector for the 2023–2027 term.

== History ==
=== Maluku–West Irian Higher Education Foundation (1955–1962) ===
The establishment of higher education institutions in Maluku was initiated by Dr. Jacob Bernadus Sitanala along with several regional intellectual figures as a manifestation of the community's aspirations to accelerate human resource development in Eastern Indonesia. This collective effort materialized with the formation of the Maluku–West Irian Higher Education Foundation on 20 July 1955, chaired by Cornelis Loppies. The foundation marked the beginning of formal higher education institutionalization based on self-reliance, aiming to facilitate academic access for local students amid post-independence infrastructure limitations.

The first academic implementation began with the inauguration of the Faculty of Law on 3 October 1956, which is historically recognized as the founding day (dies natalis) of Universitas Pattimura. As the oldest faculty, it pioneered legal and constitutional research traditions in the Maluku archipelago, although it initially operated under a private foundation. Support from the Maluku Regional Government played a crucial role in maintaining operational stability during its formative years while strengthening the foundation’s legitimacy as a credible higher education provider at the regional level.

Between 1959 and 1961, the foundation progressively diversified its academic disciplines to respond to the need for skilled professionals in the public sector. This was marked by the establishment of the Faculty of Social and Political Sciences on 6 October 1959, followed by the Faculty of Teacher Training and Education (FKIP) on 10 September 1961 to address the shortage of educators in Maluku. This expansion reflected a systematic transformation from a local educational institution into an entity with sufficient organizational capacity to provide large-scale higher education.

During its first seven years, the foundation successfully laid essential epistemological and administrative foundations for the future development of the university. Its success in managing diverse academic disciplines attracted the attention of the central government, which sought to integrate the institution into the national education system. The transition from a private entity to a public institution became a crucial prerequisite for ensuring sustainable funding, improving faculty quality, and strengthening the university’s bargaining position in the national academic landscape.

=== State University Period (1962–1963) ===
The formal legal process of becoming a public university began on 1 August 1962 through the Decree of the Minister of Higher Education and Science (PTIP) Number 99 of 1962. This nationalization policy was part of a broader decentralization strategy aimed at distributing access to education evenly across all provinces in Indonesia. Following this change, the university underwent a comprehensive restructuring under state coordination, including curriculum standardization, legal recognition of degrees, and allocation of state budget funding for campus development.

To meet the requirements of a comprehensive public university, the institution was required to integrate natural sciences into its academic structure. Accordingly, on 1 September 1963, the Faculty of Agriculture/Forestry and the Faculty of Animal Husbandry were established to complement the existing social science faculties. This expansion was a strategic step to align the university’s curriculum with the bio-geographical potential of Maluku, rich in natural resources, thus positioning the university as both a center for theoretical study and practical innovation.

This transitional period also involved significant internal reorganization to align academic quality with national standards set by the PTIP Ministry. Faculties that previously operated independently under the foundation were unified into a more cohesive and bureaucratic university structure. The appointment of nationally competent academic officials during this period aimed to create a more competitive research climate and ensure the effective implementation of the tri dharma of higher education in a frontier region.

Although it had officially become a state university in August 1962, the institution initially operated without a specific nomenclature reflecting its local identity. This phase marked a period of institutional identity consolidation while awaiting official naming by the President. The nationalization represented a juridical milestone that ended the era of private foundation management and marked the beginning of the university’s role as an intellectual pillar of the state in Eastern Indonesia.

=== University of Pattimura ===
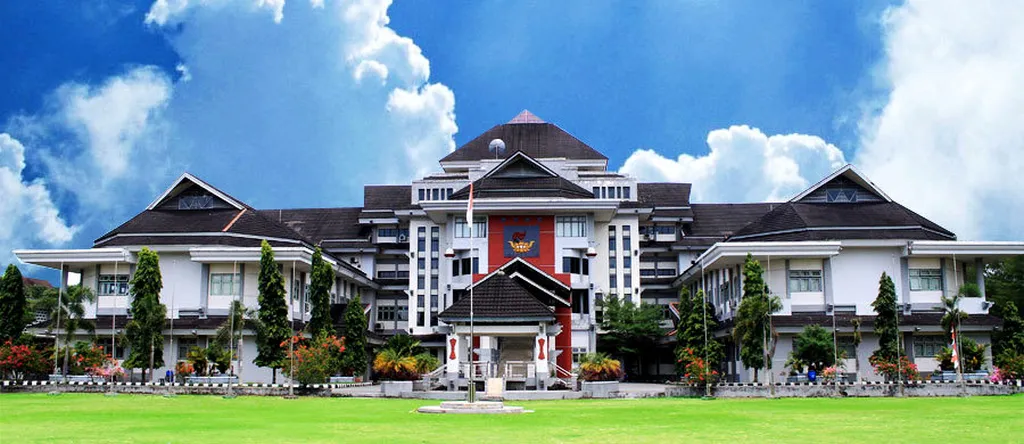
University of Pattimura

The culmination of institutional development occurred on 23 April 1963, when President Sukarno issued Presidential Decree Number 66 of 1963, officially naming the institution University of Pattimura (Unpatti) as the 15th public university in Indonesia. The name "Pattimura" carries deep symbolic significance, representing the heroic spirit of Kapitan Pattimura as a symbol of intellectual courage and resistance against ignorance. This formal recognition granted Unpatti full sovereignty to stand alongside other public universities in Indonesia in fulfilling the mission of educating the nation.

Following its establishment, Unpatti continued to expand academically with the opening of the Faculty of Economics on 15 September 1965 and the Faculty of Engineering on 16 April 1970. The development of the Faculty of Engineering utilized infrastructure from the former Ambon Faculty of Technology project, representing an efficient use of state assets for educational purposes. During the same period, teacher education experienced institutional changes, with FKIP temporarily becoming a branch of IKIP Jakarta in 1964 before being reintegrated into Unpatti on 16 September 1969.

To address the geographical challenges of the Maluku archipelago, Universitas Pattimura later adopted a core scientific pattern (Pola Ilmiah Pokok – PIP) oriented toward "Bina Mulia Kelautan" (Marine Excellence Development). This strategic vision directed research and teaching activities toward maritime excellence, evident in the transformation of the Faculty of Animal Husbandry into the Faculty of Animal Husbandry/Fisheries in 1974. This specialization positioned Unpatti as a national reference center for marine and small-island resource studies.

Today, Universitas Pattimura has evolved into a comprehensive higher education institution offering a wide range of disciplines from medicine to pure sciences at undergraduate and postgraduate levels. From a modest local foundation initiative, Unpatti has transformed into an intellectual beacon playing a crucial role in educational diplomacy in the Pacific region. Its long history demonstrates that dedication to knowledge can transcend geographical limitations and infrastructural constraints for the advancement of civilization.

== Rectors ==
Initially, based on Presidential Decree Number 66 of 1963 dated 23 April 1963, Universitas Pattimura was led by a presidium consisting of:

List of presidium members
No.	Presidium and Members	
1	Soemitro Hamidjoyo, S.H.	Chairman
2	Mohammad Padang	Member
3	Drs. Soehardjo	Member
4	Kolonel Boesiri	Member
5	Dr. M. Haulussy	Member

List of rectors University of Pattimura
	Rectors	Term start	Term start
1	Ir. Leonard Nanlohy	1971	1981
2	Muhammad Riza Laiq Lestaluhu, S.H	1981	1985
3	Dr. Ir. Jan Christian Lawalata, M.Sc	1985	1989
4	Prof. Dr. Ir. Jack Lourens Nanere, M.Sc	1989	1994
5	Dr. Mus Huliselan	1994	2004
6	Prof. Dr. Hendrik Bernadus Tetelepta, M.Pd	2004	2008
6	Prof. Dr. Hendrik Bernadus Tetelepta, M.Pd	2008	2012
7	Prof Dr. Thomas Pentury, M.Si	2012	2016
8	Prof. Dr. Marthinus Johanes Saptenno, SH., M.Hum	2016	2023
9	Prof. Dr. Fredy Leiwakabessy, M.Pd	2023	2027

== Faculties ==
Based on the Presidential Decree of the Republic of Indonesia Number 73 of 1982 concerning the organizational structure of Pattimura University, Pattimura University currently has 9 Faculties and a Postgraduate Program, with Bachelor, Professional, Master, and Doctoral education levels, as follows:

Faculties of Pattimura University
Faculty	Establishment Date	Departments/Study Programs	Programs	Location
Fakultas Hukum	3 Oktober 1956	Civil Law, Criminal Law, Constitutional Law/Administrative Law, International Law	Bachelor, Master, and Doctoral	Jalan. Ir. M. Putuhena, Poka, Kec. Tlk. Ambon, Kota Ambon, Maluku
Fakultas llmu Sosial dan llmu Politik	5 Oktober 1959	Sociology, Public Administration, Government Science, Communication Science	Bachelor and Master	Jalan. Ir. M. Putuhena, Poka, Kec. Tlk. Ambon, Kota Ambon, Maluku
Fakultas Keguruan dan llmu Pendidikan	3 November 1961	History Education, Geography Education, Economics Education, Pancasila and Civic Education (PPKN), Accounting Education, Elementary School Teacher Education, Health and Recreation Physical Education, Guidance and Counseling, Out-of-School Education/Non-Formal Education, Education Administration, Mathematics Education, Education Management, Physics Education, Chemistry Education, Biology Education, English Education, Indonesian Language and Literature Education, German Language Education, Professional Teacher Education	Bachelor, Master, and Doctoral	Jalan. Ir. M. Putuhena, Poka, Kec. Tlk. Ambon, Kota Ambon, Maluku
Fakultas Pertanian	11 Nopember 1963	Agribusiness, Agricultural Extension, Animal Husbandry, Agrotechnology, Plant Breeding, Soil Science, Agricultural Product Technology, Forestry, Environmental Science, Forest Management, Land Management, Forestry Management, Agricultural Science	Bachelor and Master	Jalan. Ir. M. Putuhena, Poka, Kec. Tlk. Ambon, Kota Ambon, Maluku
Fakultas Ekonomi Dan Bisnis	1 September 1965	Accounting, Management, Development Economics	Bachelor and Master	Jalan. Ir. M. Putuhena, Poka, Kec. Tlk. Ambon, Kota Ambon, Maluku
Fakultas Teknik	16 April 1970	Mechanical Engineering, Naval Architecture, Marine Systems Engineering, Industrial Engineering, Civil Engineering, Urban and Regional Planning, Electrical Engineering, Informatics Engineering, Geological Engineering	Bachelor	Jalan. Ir. M. Putuhena, Poka, Kec. Tlk. Ambon, Kota Ambon, Maluku
Fakultas Perikanan & Ilmu Kelautan	15 Nopember 1976	Aquatic Resources Management, Marine and Small Islands Resource Management, Fishery Product Technology, Fishery Agribusiness, Marine Science, Aquatic Resources Utilization, Aquaculture	Bachelor, Master, and Doctoral	Jalan Mr, Jl Chr. Soplanit, Poka, Teluk Ambon, Kota Ambon, Maluku
Fakultas MIPA	26 Februari 1998	Mathematics, Biology, Physics, Chemistry, Statistics, Biotechnology, Computer Science, Pharmacy	Bachelor and Master	Jalan. Ir. M. Putuhena, Poka, Kec. Tlk. Ambon, Kota Ambon, Maluku
Fakultas Kedokteran	11 Juli 2008	Medical Education, Medical Profession	Bachelor	Jalan. Ir. M. Putuhena, Poka, Kec. Tlk. Ambon, Kota Ambon, Maluku

== Identity Attributes ==
=== Emblem ===
The emblem of Pattimura University is a visual representation of noble values, the spirit of struggle, and the institution's academic commitment. Each element contains deep philosophical meanings as follows: Pentagonal Shield: The pentagonal shield base symbolizes defense and the steadfastness of the Pancasila spirit. This confirms that Pancasila is the ideological foundation and the driving spirit in every form of struggle and implementation of the university's Dharma Bhakti.

Pattimura Torch: The primary element, a torch, refers to the national hero from Maluku, Thomas Matulessy (Kapitan Pattimura). The triple-branched flame symbolizes the Tri Dharma Perguruan Tinggi (Education, Research, and Community Service), which must be carried out with an unextinguishable heroic spirit. Lotus Flower: The presence of the lotus flower reflects the purity of knowledge and wisdom. The lotus, capable of growing beautifully in various conditions, symbolizes the institution as an adaptive and wise center for intellectual development.

Pearls and Historical Symbolism: The pearls symbolize perseverance in seeking knowledge and consistency in carrying out the Tri Dharma to produce high-quality educational outputs. Date Codification: Three pearls, ten crown bases, and the lotus petals symbolically refer to the original founding date of the first faculty, which is October 3rd (3 pearls and 10 crown/petals). Historical Reconciliation: Although the university's anniversary (Dies Natalis) is now administratively observed every April 23rd in accordance with Presidential Decree No. 66 of 1963, the symbolic elements of October 3rd are maintained in the emblem as a form of respect for the university's early historical roots.

=== Colors ===
In addition to the symbolism of its shape, the colors of the Pattimura University emblem carry philosophical messages that underlie the character of its academic community:

White: Symbolizes purity of heart and sincerity of intention in seeking and applying knowledge. This color represents the moral integrity that every academician must possess.

Yellow: Symbolizes perseverance and glory. This color suggests that high intellectual achievement can only be reached through a consistent, disciplined, and resilient learning process.

Red: Symbolizes courage. Aligned with the spirit of Kapitan Pattimura, the color red emphasizes the university's bravery in facing the changing times and its steadfastness in defending scientific truth.

=== Motto ===
Motto: "Hotumese" (Thriving Through Challenges) Pattimura University carries the motto "Hotumese," which in the local language means "Thriving Through Challenges." This slogan is not merely a phrase but a manifestation of the resilience of the Maluku islander community.

This motto affirms Unpatti's strategic vision to continue innovating, improving research quality, and expanding community service contributions despite various geographical constraints and socio-political dynamics. Hotumese serves as a collective commitment for Pattimura University to remain a beacon of knowledge in Eastern Indonesia.

=== Flag ===
The Pattimura University flag is a symbol of institutional identity used in academic ceremonies and official state activities. The flag has the following specifications: Shape and Color: The flag is rectangular with a light blue base color. The choice of light blue reflects the depth of knowledge, intellectual serenity, and the identity of Maluku as an archipelagic region surrounded by vast oceans.

Placement of the Emblem: The Pattimura University emblem is placed exactly in the center of the flag. This position symbolizes that the values contained within the emblem including the spirit of the Pattimura torch and the Tri Dharma principles are the central orientation for the entire academic community.

Symbolic Function: This flag stands alongside the Indonesian National Flag (Merah Putih) in every graduation procession and formal ceremony, symbolizing the academic sovereignty of Pattimura University as a state educational institution under the Republic of Indonesia. In addition to the university flag, each faculty within Unpatti also has a flag with different base colors to distinguish the identity of their respective disciplines.

=== Hymn ===
Universitas Pattimura Pelambang kecerdasan Nusa Bangsa;

Lambang Penjelmaan tuntutan sejarah

pewujud idaman Bhineka Tunggal lka.

Reff :

Padamu Kuberjanji, Untukmu Kuberbakti, Bagimu Kumengabdi,

untuk kejayaan lbu Pertiwi,

Universitas Pattimura pembina generasi Pancasila

Pusat Penelitian llmu Pengetahuan untuk pengabdian kemasyarakatan.

=== March ===
Perguruan Tinggi Indonesia Pelambang kecerdasan bangsa dan cermin bagi jelata,

sadar akan panggilannya.

Dengan Dharma Pendidikan dan Research serta pengabdian,

setia membina masyarakat bangsa wujudkan cita-cita Pancasila.

Universitas Pattimura sumber penggerak pembaharuan.

Hiduplah (hiduplah) Hiduplah jiwanya, suburlah raganya.

Universitas Pattimura setia mencipta kader bangsa, menyimpan

angkatan pembangunan merata di seluruh Nusantara.
