= Wang Shanping =

Chinese politician

- 王善平

Mayor of Ziyang
- In office 28 April 2022 – 25 April 2024
- Party Secretary: Yuan Fang
- Preceded by: Xu Zhiwen

Personal details
- Born: March 1966 (age 60) Dazhu County, Sichuan, China
- Party: Chinese Communist Party
- Education: Central Party School of the Chinese Communist Party

Wang Shanping (Chinese: 王善平; pinyin: Wáng Shànpíng; born March 1966) is a former Chinese politician who spent most of his entire career in southwest China's Sichuan province. He was investigated by China's top anti-graft agency in April 2024. Previously he served as mayor of Ziyang. He was a delegate to the 14th National People's Congress.

== Early life and education ==
Wang was born in Dazhu County, Sichuan, in March 1966, the year the Cultural Revolution broke out.

== Career ==
Wang got involved in politics in March 1984, and joined the Chinese Communist Party (CCP) in April 1985. He was head of Baijia Township (now Qinghe Town) in November 1988 and subsequently party secretary the next year. In July 1991, he became deputy party secretary of Qinghe District, rising to party secretary in February 1994. He was appointed deputy magistrate of Dazhu County in June 1996 and in December 1997 was admitted to member of the CCP Dazhu County Committee, the county's top authority. After five months as deputy party secretary of Xuanhan County in 2002, he was named acting mayor of Wanyuan, confirmed in March 2003. He became party secretary of Kaijiang County and chairman of the People's Congress in 2008 before being assigned to the similar position in Qu County in 2011. In November 2015, he was chosen as vice mayor of Dazhou, but having held the position for only ten months, than he was appointed deputy director of Sichuan Provincial Poverty Alleviation and Immigration Bureau. He took office as executive vice mayor of Bazhong in December 2018 and was admitted to member of the CCP Bazhong Municipal Committee, the city's top authority. He took up the post of deputy party secretary of Bazhong in January 2021. He was deputy party secretary of Nanchong in September 2021, and held that office until March 2022, when he was transferred to Ziyang and appointed mayor and deputy party secretary.

== Downfall ==
On 25 April 2024, he was put under investigation for alleged "serious violations of discipline and laws" by the Central Commission for Discipline Inspection (CCDI), the party's internal disciplinary body, and the National Supervisory Commission, the highest anti-corruption agency of China.

Government offices
Preceded by Xu Zhiwen	Mayor of Ziyang; 2022–2024	Succeeded by TBA
