= 2007 Dazhou protests =

Civil unrest

Following a week of protests, on January 17, 2007, rioters in Dazhou, Sichuan of Dazhu County stormed the Nest Business Hotel and set it alight, owing to the alleged cover-up of a 16-year-old waitress's murder by government officials. The hotel was heavily damaged in the incident.

== Description ==
The Nest Business Hotel (莱仕德) was a four-star hotel run by local government officials in the city of Dazhou. It had developed a bad reputation in the surrounding area due to supposed crimes going on behind closed doors and the deaths of 2 wait staff and a security guard.

On December 29, 2006, three high-ranking provincial officials went to the Nest Business Hotel and asked Yang Daili (杨代莉), a 16-year-old waitress working at the hotel's karaoke rooms, to have dinner with them. The next morning, she would be found dead in a suite at the hotel. Initially, it was claimed that she died of alcohol poisoning, but a police report only released following the riot on would come to the conclusion that Yang had been drugged and raped.

Yang's family started a protest outside the hotel on January 12, 2007. After they received no explanation from the hotel despite repeated requests, sympathizers and anti-corruption activists gathered around the family to show their support. Up to 20,000 people participated in the protests leading up to the riot. Official government news, however, failed to mention anything on these three previous murders and it once again attempted do the same for the most recent murder.

By the afternoon of January 17, 2007, more than 10,000 protesters rushed inside the hotel and set it ablaze with gasoline after news got out of the hotel offering Yang Daili's family 500,000 RMB (approx. $65,000 at the time) to settle. Firetrucks were blocked from reaching the hotel. The fire burned for 5 hours. Once the fire was put out, some stuck around the area and clashed with riot police.

The day after, on January 18, 2007, the aforementioned police report was released by government media. A male hotel employee only referred to as Liu (劉) was charged the same day with Yang's murder. Many of the local populace still view Liu's conviction as an attempt to cover up the involvement of the three provincial governmental officials whom Yang was last spotted with.
