= Guanyin, Dazhu County =

Guanyin 观音镇
- Town
- Location in Sichuan
- Coordinates: 30°40′35″N 107°26′50″E
- Country: People's Republic of China
- Province: Sichuan
- Prefecture-level city: Dazhou
- County: Dazhu County
- Time zone: UTC+8 (China Standard)

Guanyin (Chinese: 观音; pinyin: Guānyīn) is a town in Dazhu County, Sichuan province, China. As of 2020, it has four residential neighborhoods and 18 villages under its administration:

== Neighborhoods ==
- Guanyinqiao Community (观音桥社区)
- Chaoyin Community (朝印社区)
- Baibazi Community (白坝子社区)
- Xindian Community (新店社区)

== Villages ==
- Youyi Village (友谊村)
- Shuangxi Village (双溪村)
- Daban Village (大板村)
- Qinggang Village (青杠村)
- Qinghe Village (清河村)
- Gaohe Village (高河村)
- Mingyue Village (明月村)
- Jiajiaoshan Village (贾角山村)
- Xiaohe Village (小河村)
- Shuanghekou Village (双河口村)
- Guanghui Village (光辉村)
- Yan'er Village (雁尔村)
- Renyi Village (仁义村)
- Gonghe Village (共和村)
- Wenchang Village (文昌村)
- Puzhao Village (普照村)
- Jinxing Village (金星村)
- Sanqing Village (三青村)

== See also ==
- List of township-level divisions of Sichuan
