= Zebrafish Information Network =

Model organism database on zebrafish

ZFIN

Content
- Description: Zebrafish Model Organism Database.
- Organisms: Zebrafish

Contact
- Research center: University of Oregon
- Primary citation: Bradford & al. (2011)
- Release date: 2010

Access
- Website: http://zfin.org

The Zebrafish Information Network (ZFIN) is an online biological database of information about the zebrafish (Danio rerio). The zebrafish is a widely used model organism for genetic, genomic, and developmental studies, and ZFIN provides an integrated interface for querying and displaying the large volume of data generated by this research. To facilitate use of the zebrafish as a model of human biology, ZFIN links these data to corresponding information about other model organisms (e.g., mouse) and to human disease databases. Abundant links to external sequence databases (e.g., GenBank) and to genome browsers are included. Gene product, gene expression, and phenotype data are annotated with terms from biomedical ontologies. ZFIN is based at the University of Oregon in the United States, with funding provided by the National Institutes of Health (NIH).

== Contents ==
ZFIN consists of two principal parts:

1. a website of community news and announcements, as well as biological resources such as laboratory protocols, a gene nomenclature guide, and anatomy information
2. a relational database containing biological data that are curated from the scientific literature and that are directly submitted by zebrafish research laboratories (e.g., Thisse high-throughput gene expression analysis).

Information in ZFIN is tightly linked to the web resources of the Zebrafish International Resource Center (ZIRC), the China Zebrafish Resource Center (CZRC), and so on, which maintain and provide zebrafish-related research resources, materials and services.

ZFIN's relational database interface provides query forms and display pages for the following biological data types:

- Genes, markers, and clones
- Gene expression
- Antibodies
- Sequence alignments (BLAST)
- Mutants and transgenic lines
- Anatomy
- Genetic maps

ZFIN also maintains a database of zebrafish-related publications, laboratories, people, and companies.

In addition to its specialized search interfaces, ZFIN provides a Google-like global site search.

ZFIN's community wiki gives zebrafish researchers the ability to share information about laboratory protocols and antibodies.

== See also ==
- Wormbase
- Flybase
- Xenbase
