= IHB =

IHB may refer to:

- Indiana Harbor Belt Railroad
- Indiana Historical Bureau
- Institute of Hydrobiology
- Irregular heartbeat
- International Hydrographic Bureau or as it's more currently known the International Hydrographic Organization
