= Bao Hui =

Chinese politician (born 1963)

- 包惠

Director of the Standing Committee of the Chengdu Municipal People's Congress
- In office 26 January 2022 – 1 March 2025
- Preceded by: Li Zhongbin
- Succeeded by: Zhang Yan

Personal details
- Born: August 1963 (age 63) Xuanwei, Yunnan, China
- Party: Chinese Communist Party (1983-2026, expelled)
- Education: Southwest Jiaotong University

Bao Hui (Chinese: 包惠; born August 1963) is a Chinese former female politician, who served as the director of the Standing Committee of the Chengdu Municipal People's Congress from 2022 to 2025. She was a delegate to the 12th National People's Congress.

== Career ==
Bao was born in Xuanwei, Yunnan in August 1963. She was graduated from Southwest Jiaotong University, which majored in bridge in 1984. After graduating, she served as an instructor of the university, and also served some posts.

In December 1998, Bao was appointed as the deputy district chief of Qingyang District, Chengdu, and served as the director of the Chengdu Municipal Environmental Protection Bureau in 2001.

In 2005, Bao was appointed as the standing member of the CCP Chengdu Municipal Committee. During this time, she was concurrently served as the chairman of the Municipal Federation of Worker's Union, the head of the United Front Work Department, the head of the Propaganda Department.

In September 2012, Bao was transferred to Dazhou, who served as the mayor. She was promoted to the party secretary in February 2016.

In January 2018, Bao was elected as the vice director of the Standing Committee of the Sichuan Provincial People's Congress. She was stepped down the party secretary of Dazhou in April 2021.

On 26 January 2022, Bao was elected as the director of the Standing Committee of the Chengdu Municipal People's Congress. She was stepped down the post due to reaching the retiring age in March 2025.

== Investigation ==
On 27 January 2026, Bao was suspected of "serious violations of laws and regulations" by the Central Commission for Discipline Inspection (CCDI), the party's internal disciplinary body, and the National Supervisory Commission, the highest anti-corruption agency of China. Bao was expelled from the party on 14 October 2026.

Assembly seats
Preceded by Li Zhongbin	Director of the Standing Committee of the Chengdu Municipal People's Congress; 2022–2025	Succeeded by Zhang Yan
Party political offices
Preceded by Jiao Weixia	Party Secretary of Dazhou; 2016–2021	Succeeded by Shao Gejun
Government offices
Preceded by He Jian	Mayor of Dazhou; 2012–2016	Succeeded by Guo Hengxiao
