= Shen Zhonghou =

Chinese engineer (1928–2021)

- 沈忠厚
- Born: 13 February 1928; Dazhu County, Sichuan, China
- Died: 5 February 2021 (aged 92); Beijing, China
- Education: Chongqing University
- Scientific career
- Fields: Theory and Technology of High-pressure Waterjet
- Workplaces: China University of Petroleum (Beijing)

Shen Zhonghou (Chinese: 沈忠厚; pinyin: Shěn Zhōnghòu; 13 February 1928 – 5 February 2021) was a Chinese engineer who was a professor and doctoral supervisor at China University of Petroleum (Beijing). He was an academician of the Chinese Academy of Engineering (CAE). He was hailed as "Father of Drilling Bit".

== Biography ==
Shen was born in the town of Tiancheng, Dazhu County, Sichuan, on 13 February 1928. In September 1947, he was admitted to Chongqing University, majoring in petroleum engineering. After graduating in September 1951, he taught at the university. He joined the Chinese Communist Party in January 1957. He joined the faculty of China University of Petroleum (Beijing) in September 1955, where he was promoted to associate professor in 1962 and to full professor in 1983. And he served as its director of the Department of Petroleum Engineering in September 1983. From March 1981 to July 1981 he studied at the University of Louisiana. He was a visiting scholar at the University of Texas at Austin and Stanford University from November 1987 to February 1988. He was a scholar at Tohoku University between February 1991 and September 1991. On 5 February 2021, he died of illness in Beijing, aged 92, eight days short from his 93rd birthday.

== Honors and awards ==
- 2001 Member of the Chinese Academy of Engineering (CAE)
