= Tongchuan, Dazhou =

Tongchuan 通川区
- District
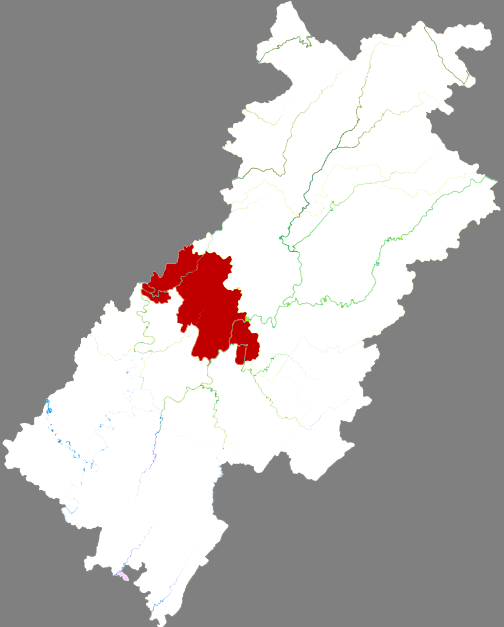

- Location in Sichuan
- Coordinates: 31°12′53″N 107°30′17″E
- Country: China
- Province: Sichuan
- Prefecture-level city: Dazhou
- District seat: Dongcheng Subdistrict

Area
  - Total: 451 km^{2} (174 sq mi)

Population (2020 census)
  - Total: 905,678
  - Density: 2,010/km^{2} (5,200/sq mi)
- Time zone: UTC+8 (China Standard)
- Website: www.tchuan.gov.cn

Tongchuan (Chinese: 通川; pinyin: Tōngchuān) is a district of the city of Dazhou, Sichuan Province, China.

== Administrative divisions ==
Tongchuan District administers 5 subdistricts, 12 towns, and 1 township:

- Dongcheng Subdistrict (东城街道)
- Xicheng Subdistrict (西城街道)
- Chaoyang Subdistrict (朝阳街道)
- Fengxi Subdistrict (凤西街道)
- Fengbei Subdistrict (凤北街道)
- Luojiang Town (罗江镇)
- Pujia Town (蒲家镇)
- Fuxing Town (复兴镇)
- Shuanglong Town (双龙镇)
- Jiangling Town (江陵镇)
- Beimiao Town (碑庙镇)
- Panshi Town (磐石镇)
- Dongyue Town (东岳镇)
- Zitong Town (梓桐镇)
- Beishan Town (北山镇)
- Jinshi Town (金石镇)
- Qingning Town (青宁镇)
- Anyun Township (安云乡)
