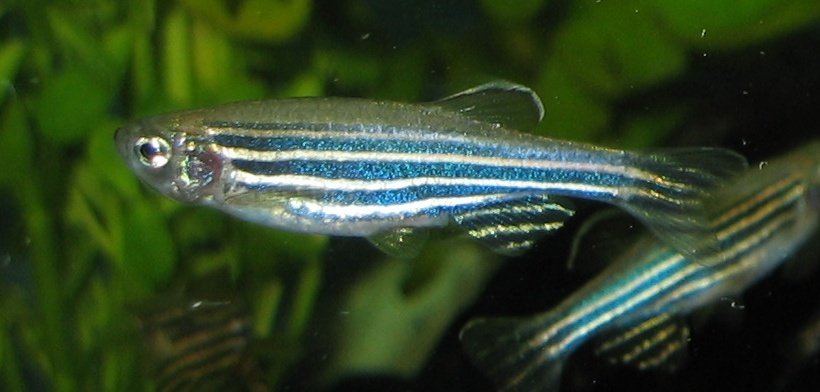
- An adult female zebrafish

Conservation status
- Least Concern (IUCN 3.1)

Scientific classification
- Kingdom: Animalia
- Phylum: Chordata
- Class: Actinopterygii
- Division: Teleostei
- Order: Cypriniformes
- Family: Danionidae
- Subfamily: Danioninae
- Genus: Danio
- Species: D. rerio

Binomial name
- Danio rerio (F. Hamilton, 1822)

Synonyms
- Cyprinus rerio Hamilton, 1822; Brachydanio rerio (Hamilton 1822); Cyprinus chapalio Hamilton, 1822; Perilampus striatus McClelland, 1839; Danio lineatus Day, 1868; Brachydanio frankei Meinken, 1963; Danio horai Barman, 1983

= Zebrafish =

Danio rerio

Species of fish

The zebrafish (Danio rerio) is a species of danionin belonging to the genus Danio in the suborder Cyprinoidei. Native to South Asia, it is a popular, hardy aquarium fish, frequently sold under the trade name zebra danio (thus often mislabeled as a "tropical fish", even though they also inhabit subtropical and temperate waters).

The zebrafish is extensively used as a vertebrate model organism in scientific research, particularly developmental biology, but also gene function, oncology, teratology, and drug development, in particular pre-clinical development, due to its scalability from high numbers of offspring and ease of drug delivery through water into the gills. It is also notable for its regenerative abilities, and has been modified by researchers to produce many transgenic strains.

== Taxonomy ==
The zebrafish is a derived member of the genus Danio, of the family Cyprinidae. It has a sister-group relationship with Danio aesculapii. Zebrafish are also closely related to the genus Devario, as demonstrated by a phylogenetic tree of close species.

== Distribution ==
=== Range ===
The zebrafish is native to freshwater habitats in South Asia where it is found in India, Pakistan, Bangladesh, Nepal and Bhutan. The northern limit is in the South Himalayas, ranging from the Sutlej river basin in the Pakistan–India border region to the state of Arunachal Pradesh in northeast India. Its range is concentrated in the Ganges and Brahmaputra River basins, and the species was first described from Kosi River (lower Ganges basin) of India. Its range further south is more local, with scattered records from the Western and Eastern Ghats regions. It has frequently been said to occur in Myanmar (Burma), but this is entirely based on pre-1930 records and likely refers to close relatives only described later, notably Danio quagga and Danio kyathit. Likewise, old records from Sri Lanka are highly questionable and remain unconfirmed.

Zebrafish have been introduced to a variety of places outside their natural range, including California, Connecticut, Florida and New Mexico in the United States, presumably by intentional release by aquarists or by escape from fish farms. The New Mexico population had been extirpated by 2003 and it is unclear if the others survive, as the last published records were decades ago. Elsewhere the species has been introduced to Colombia and Malaysia.

=== Habitats ===
Zebrafish typically inhabit moderately flowing to stagnant clear water of quite shallow depth in streams, canals, ditches, oxbow lakes, ponds and rice paddies. There is usually some vegetation, either submerged or overhanging from the banks, and the bottom is sandy, muddy or silty, often mixed with pebbles or gravel. In surveys of zebrafish locations throughout much of its Bangladeshi and Indian distribution, the water had a near-neutral to somewhat basic pH and mostly ranged from 16.5 to 34 °C (61.7–93.2 °F) in temperature. In contrast, zebrafish in acidified freshwater were found to have reduced survival rates and impairments of their lateral line system. One unusually cold site was only 12.3 °C (54.1 °F) and another unusually warm site was 38.6 °C (101.5 °F), but the zebrafish still appeared healthy. The unusually cold temperature was at one of the highest known zebrafish locations at 1,576 m (5,171 ft) above sea level, although the species has been recorded to 1,795 m (5,889 ft).

== Description ==
The zebrafish is named for the five uniform, pigmented, horizontal, blue stripes on the side of the body, which are reminiscent of a zebra's stripes, and which extend to the end of the caudal fin. Its shape is fusiform and laterally compressed, with its mouth directed upwards. The male is torpedo-shaped, with gold stripes between the blue stripes; the female has a larger, whitish belly and silver stripes instead of gold. Adult females exhibit a small genital papilla in front of the anal fin origin. The zebrafish can reach up to 4–5 cm (1.6–2.0 in) in length, although they typically are 1.8–3.7 cm (0.7–1.5 in) in the wild with some variations depending on location. Its lifespan in captivity is around two to three years, although in ideal conditions, this may be extended to over five years. In the wild it is typically an annual species.

== Reproduction ==
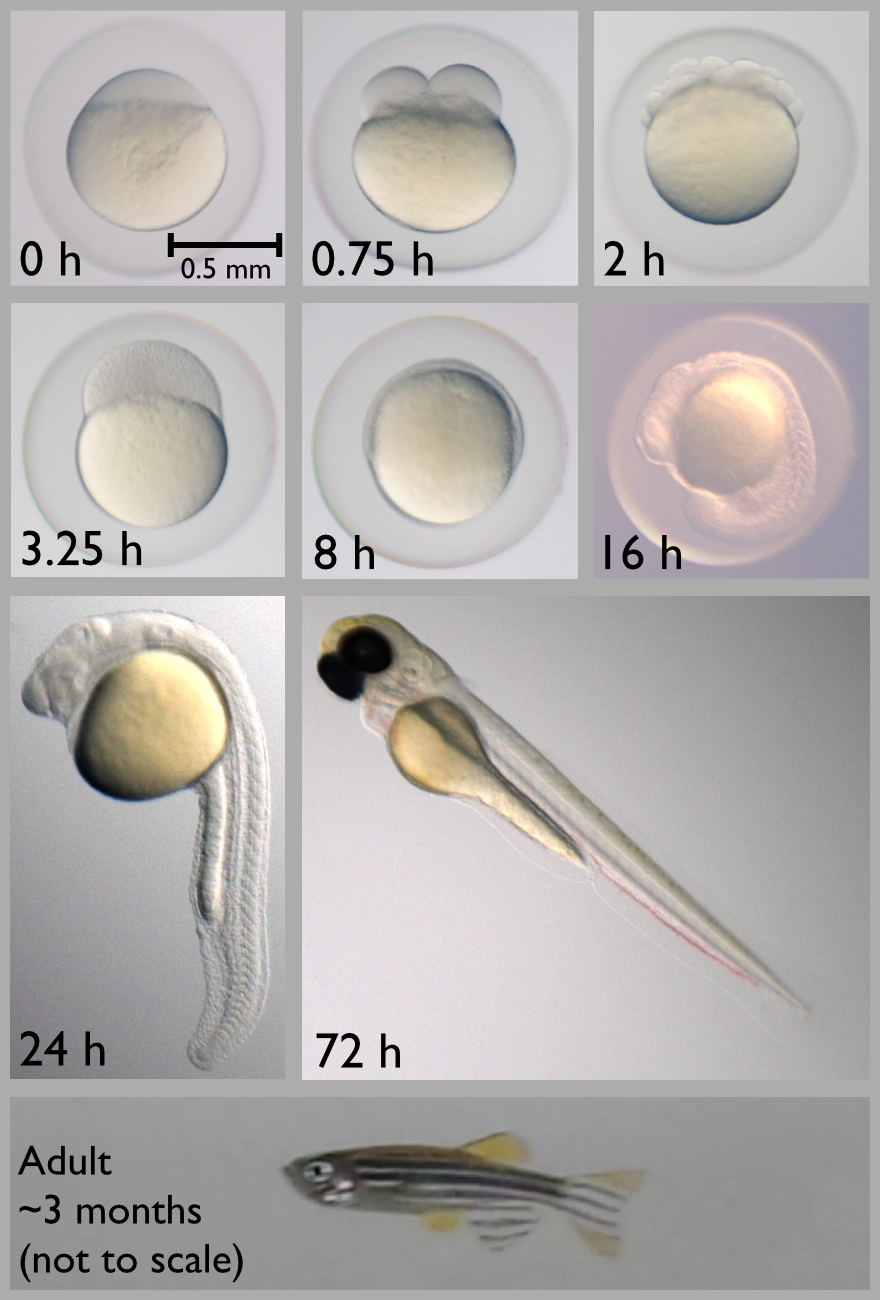
Stages of zebrafish development. Photos to scale except adult, which is about 2.5 cm (1 in) long.

The approximate generation time for Danio rerio is three months. A male must be present for ovulation and spawning to occur. Zebrafish are asynchronous spawners and under optimal conditions (such as food availability and favorable water parameters) can spawn successfully frequently, even on a daily basis. Females are able to spawn at intervals of two to three days, laying hundreds of eggs in each clutch. Upon release, embryonic development begins; in absence of sperm, growth stops after the first few cell divisions. Fertilized eggs almost immediately become transparent, a characteristic that makes D. rerio a convenient research model species. Sex determination of common laboratory strains was shown to be a complex genetic trait, rather than to follow a simple ZW or XY system.

The zebrafish embryo develops rapidly, with precursors to all major organs appearing within 36 hours of fertilization. The embryo begins as a yolk with a single enormous cell on top (see image, 0 h panel), which divides into two (0.75 h panel) and continues dividing until there are thousands of small cells (3.25 h panel). The cells then migrate down the sides of the yolk (8 h panel) and begin forming a head and tail (16 h panel). The tail then grows and separates from the body (24 h panel). The yolk shrinks over time because the fish uses it for food as it matures during the first few days (72 h panel). After a few months, the adult fish reaches reproductive maturity

To encourage the fish to spawn, some researchers use a fish tank with a sliding bottom insert, which reduces the depth of the pool to simulate the shore of a river. Zebrafish spawn best in the morning due to their Circadian rhythms. Researchers have been able to collect 10,000 embryos in 10 minutes using this method. In particular, one pair of adult fish is capable of laying 200–300 eggs in one morning in approximately 5 to 10 at time. Male zebrafish are furthermore known to respond to more pronounced markings on females, i.e., "good stripes", but in a group, males will mate with whichever females they can find. What attracts females is not currently understood. The presence of plants, even plastic plants, also apparently encourages spawning.

Exposure to environmentally relevant concentrations of diisononyl phthalate (DINP), commonly used in a large variety of plastic items, disrupt the endocannabinoid system, disrupt cranio-facial cartilage of offsprings, and thereby affect reproduction in a sex-specific and developmental manner.

== In the aquarium ==
Zebrafish are hardy fish and considered good for beginner aquarists. Their enduring popularity can be attributed to their playful disposition, as well as their rapid breeding, aesthetics, cheap price and broad availability. They also do well in schools or shoals of six or more, and interact well with other fish species in the aquarium. However, they are susceptible to Oodinium or velvet disease, microsporidia (Pseudoloma neurophilia), and Mycobacterium species. Given the opportunity, adults eat hatchlings, which may be protected by separating the two groups with a net, breeding box or separate tank. In captivity, zebrafish live approximately forty-two months. Some captive zebrafish can develop a curved spine.

The zebra danio was also used to make genetically modified fish and were the first species to be sold as GloFish (fluorescent colored fish).

== Strains ==
In late 2003, transgenic zebrafish that express green, red, and yellow fluorescent proteins became commercially available in the United States. The fluorescent strains are trade-named GloFish; other cultivated varieties include "golden", "sandy", "longfin" and "leopard".

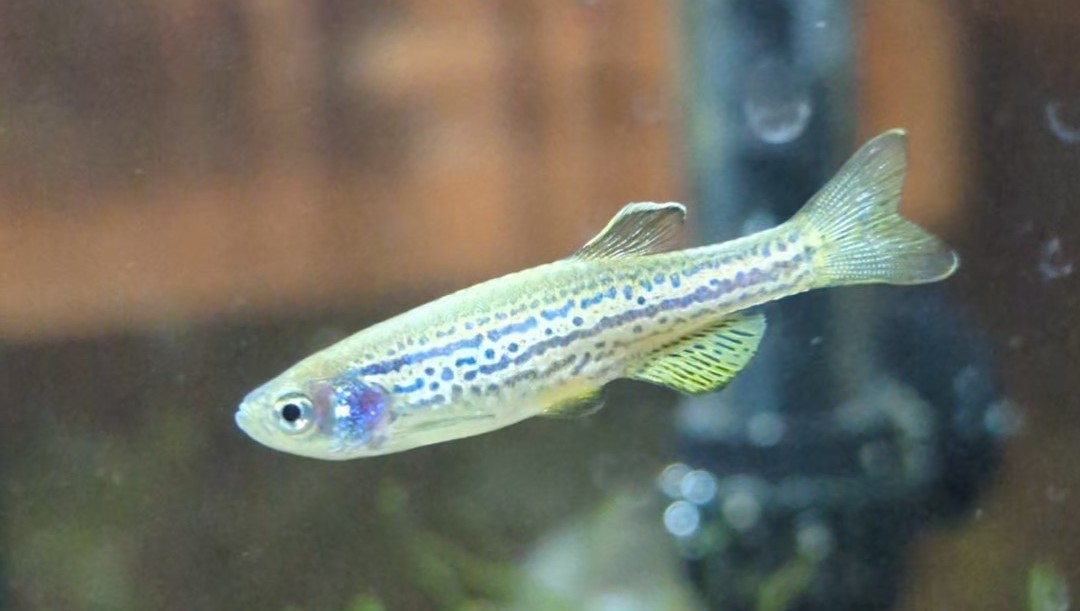
A leopard danio

The leopard danio, previously known as Danio frankei, is a spotted colour morph of the zebrafish which arose due to a pigment mutation. Xanthistic forms of both the zebra and leopard pattern, along with long-finned strains, have been obtained via selective breeding programs for the aquarium trade.

Various transgenic and mutant strains of zebrafish were stored at the China Zebrafish Resource Center (CZRC), a non-profit organization, which was jointly supported by the Ministry of Science and Technology of China and the Chinese Academy of Sciences.

=== Wild-type strains ===
The Zebrafish Information Network (ZFIN) provides up-to-date information about current known wild-type (WT) strains of D. rerio, some of which are listed below.

- AB (AB)
- AB/C32 (AB/C32)
- AB/TL (AB/TL)
- AB/Tuebingen (AB/TU)
- C32 (C32)
- Cologne (KOLN)
- Darjeeling (DAR)
- Ekkwill (EKW)
- HK/AB (HK/AB)
- HK/Sing (HK/SING)
- Hong Kong (HK)
- India (IND)
- Indonesia (INDO)
- Nadia (NA)
- RIKEN WT (RW)
- Singapore (SING)
- SJA (SJA)
- SJD (SJD)
- SJD/C32 (SJD/C32)
- Tuebingen (TU)
- Tupfel long fin (TL)
- Tupfel long fin nacre (TLN)
- WIK (WIK)
- WIK/AB (WIK/AB)

=== Hybrids ===
Hybrids between different Danio species may be fertile: for example, between D. rerio and D. nigrofasciatus.

== Scientific research ==
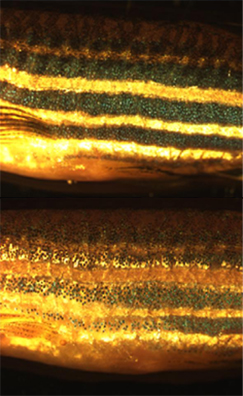
Zebrafish chromatophores, shown here mediating background adaptation, are widely studied by scientists.

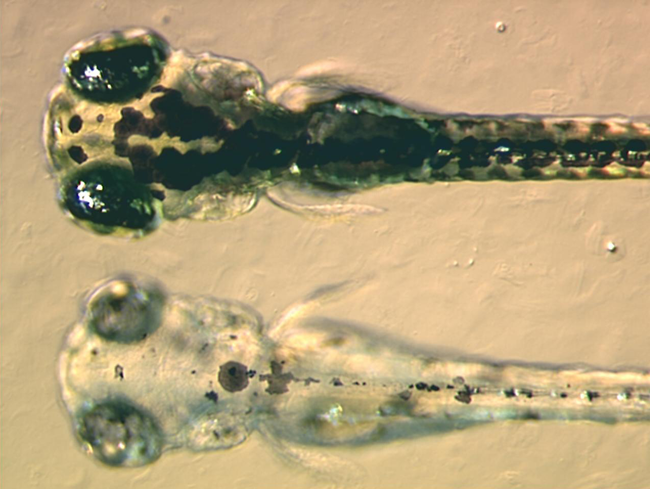
A zebrafish pigment mutant (bottom) produced by insertional mutagenesis. A wild-type embryo (top) is shown for comparison. The mutant lacks black pigment in its melanocytes because it is unable to synthesize melanin properly.

D. rerio is a common and useful scientific model organism for studies of vertebrate development and gene function. Its use as a laboratory animal was pioneered by the American molecular biologist George Streisinger and his colleagues at the University of Oregon in the 1970s and 1980s; Streisinger's zebrafish clones were among the earliest successful vertebrate clones created. Its importance has been consolidated by successful large-scale forward genetic screens (commonly referred to as the Tübingen/Boston screens). The fish has a dedicated online database of genetic, genomic, and developmental information, the Zebrafish Information Network (ZFIN). The Zebrafish International Resource Center (ZIRC) is a genetic resource repository with 29,250 alleles available for distribution to the research community. D. rerio is also one of the few fish species to have been sent into space.

Research with D. rerio has yielded advances in the fields of developmental biology, oncology, toxicology, reproductive studies, teratology, genetics, neurobiology, environmental sciences, stem cell research, regenerative medicine, muscular dystrophies and evolutionary theory.

Zebrafish are used as a model to study pancreatic development, beta-cell regeneration, and diabetes, as their pancreas is functionally and structurally conserved with that of mammals and they can regenerate insulin-producing beta cells after injury.

=== Model characteristics ===
As a model biological system, the zebrafish has many advantages for scientists. Its genome has been fully sequenced at ~1.4 billion base pairs, and it has well-understood, easy to see and test developmental behaviors. Its embryonic development is rapid, meaning that it grows up fast, and its embryos are large enough for scientific study without special equipment, robust, and transparent, and are able to develop outside of their mother. Furthermore, well-characterized mutant strains are readily available, which means that zebrafish can be used to study other organisms.

Other advantages include the species' nearly constant size during early development, which enables simple staining techniques to be used, and the fact that its two-celled embryo can be fused into a single cell to create a homozygous embryo. The zebrafish embryos are transparent and they develop outside of the uterus, which allows scientists to study the details of development starting from fertilization and continuing throughout development. The zebrafish is also demonstrably similar to mammalian models and humans in toxicity testing, and exhibits a diurnal sleep cycle with similarities to mammalian sleep behavior. However, zebrafish are not a universally ideal research model; there are a number of disadvantages to their scientific use, such as the absence of a standard diet and the presence of small but important differences between zebrafish and mammals in the roles of some genes related to human disorders.

=== Regeneration ===
Zebrafish have the ability to regenerate their heart and lateral line hair cells during their larval stages. The cardiac regenerative process likely involves signaling pathways such as Notch and Wnt; hemodynamic changes in the damaged heart are sensed by ventricular endothelial cells and their associated cardiac cilia by way of the mechanosensitive ion channel TRPV4, subsequently facilitating the Notch signaling pathway via KLF2 and activating various downstream effectors such as BMP-2 and HER2/neu. In 2011, the British Heart Foundation ran an advertising campaign publicising its intention to study the applicability of this ability to humans, stating that it aimed to raise £50 million in research funding.

Zebrafish have also been found to regenerate photoreceptor cells and retinal neurons following injury, which has been shown to be mediated by the dedifferentiation and proliferation of Müller glia. The zebrafish has been used as a model system for the study of retinal development and regeneration. Researchers frequently amputate the dorsal and ventral tail fins and analyze their regrowth to test for mutations. It has been found that histone demethylation occurs at the site of the amputation, switching the zebrafish's cells to an "active", regenerative, stem cell-like state. In 2012, Australian scientists published a study revealing that zebrafish use a specialised protein, known as fibroblast growth factor, to ensure their spinal cords heal without glial scarring after injury. In addition, hair cells of the posterior lateral line have also been found to regenerate following damage or developmental disruption. Study of gene expression during regeneration has allowed for the identification of several important signaling pathways involved in the process, such as Wnt signaling and Fibroblast growth factor.

In probing disorders of the nervous system, including neurodegenerative diseases, movement disorders, psychiatric disorders and deafness, researchers are using the zebrafish to understand how the genetic defects underlying these conditions cause functional abnormalities in the human brain, spinal cord and sensory organs. Researchers have also studied the zebrafish to gain new insights into the complexities of human musculoskeletal diseases, such as muscular dystrophy. Another focus of zebrafish research is to understand how a gene called Hedgehog, a biological signal that underlies a number of human cancers, controls cell growth.

Zebrafish demonstrate an exceptional ability to replenish lost pancreatic beta cells. High-resolution single-cell transcriptomic studies in zebrafish have resolved complex pancreatic endocrine cell differentiation trajectories and ductal remodeling processes. Specifically, tracking molecular markers like keratin 4 (krt4) and characterizing dlb transitional endocrine precursors in zebrafish have provided critical mechanistic insights into in vivo cell neogenesis and lineage shuffling

=== Genetics ===
==== Background genetics ====
Inbred strains and traditional outbred stocks have not been developed for laboratory zebrafish, and the genetic variability of wild-type lines among institutions may contribute to the replication crisis in biomedical research. Genetic differences in wild-type lines among populations maintained at different research institutions have been demonstrated using both Single-nucleotide polymorphisms and microsatellite analysis.

==== Gene expression ====
Due to their fast and short life cycles and relatively large clutch sizes, D. rerio or zebrafish are a useful model for genetic studies. A common reverse genetics technique is to reduce gene expression or modify splicing using Morpholino antisense technology. Morpholino oligonucleotides (MO) are stable, synthetic macromolecules that contain the same bases as DNA or RNA; by binding to complementary RNA sequences, they can reduce the expression of specific genes or block other processes from occurring on RNA. MO can be injected into one cell of an embryo after the 32-cell stage, reducing gene expression in only cells descended from that cell. However, cells in the early embryo (less than 32 cells) are permeable to large molecules, allowing diffusion between cells. Guidelines for using Morpholinos in zebrafish describe appropriate control strategies. Morpholinos are commonly microinjected in 500pL directly into 1–2 cell stage zebrafish embryos. The morpholino is able to integrate into most cells of the embryo.

A known problem with gene knockdowns is that, because the genome underwent a duplication after the divergence of ray-finned fishes and lobe-finned fishes, it is not always easy to silence the activity of one of the two gene paralogs reliably due to complementation by the other paralog. Despite the complications of the zebrafish genome, a number of commercially available global platforms exist for analysis of both gene expression by microarrays and promoter regulation using ChIP-on-chip.

==== Genome sequencing ====
The Wellcome Trust Sanger Institute started the zebrafish genome sequencing project in 2001, and the full genome sequence of the Tuebingen reference strain is publicly available at the National Center for Biotechnology Information (NCBI)'s Zebrafish Genome Page. The zebrafish reference genome sequence is annotated as part of the Ensembl project, and is maintained by the Genome Reference Consortium.

In 2009, researchers at the Institute of Genomics and Integrative Biology in Delhi, India, announced the sequencing of the genome of a wild zebrafish strain, containing an estimated 1.7 billion genetic letters. The genome of the wild zebrafish was sequenced at 39-fold coverage. Comparative analysis with the zebrafish reference genome revealed over 5 million single nucleotide variations and over 1.6 million insertion deletion variations. The zebrafish reference genome sequence of 1.4GB and over 26,000 protein coding genes was published by Kerstin Howe et al. in 2013.

==== Mitochondrial DNA ====
In October 2001, researchers from the University of Oklahoma published D. rerio's complete mitochondrial DNA sequence. Its length is 16,596 base pairs. This is within 100 base pairs of other related species of fish, and it is notably only 18 pairs longer than the goldfish (Carassius auratus) and 21 longer than the carp (Cyprinus carpio). Its gene order and content are identical to the common vertebrate form of mitochondrial DNA. It contains 13 protein-coding genes and a noncoding control region containing the origin of replication for the heavy strand. In between a grouping of five tRNA genes, a sequence resembling vertebrate origin of light strand replication is found. It is difficult to draw evolutionary conclusions because it is difficult to determine whether base pair changes have adaptive significance via comparisons with other vertebrates' nucleotide sequences.

==== Developmental genetics ====
T-boxes and homeoboxes are vital in Danio similarly to other vertebrates. The Bruce et al. team are known for this area, and in Bruce et al. 2003 & Bruce et al. 2005 uncover the role of two of these elements in oocytes of this species. By interfering via a dominant nonfunctional allele and a morpholino they find the T-box transcription activator Eomesodermin and its target mtx2 – a transcription factor – are vital to epiboly. (In Bruce et al. 2003 they failed to support the possibility that Eomesodermin behaves like Vegt. Neither they nor anyone else has been able to locate any mutation which – in the mother – will prevent initiation of the mesoderm or endoderm development processes in this species.)

==== Pigmentation genes ====
In 1999, the nacre mutation was identified in the zebrafish ortholog of the mammalian MITF transcription factor. Mutations in human MITF result in eye defects and loss of pigment, a type of Waardenburg Syndrome. In December 2005, a study of the golden strain identified the gene responsible for its unusual pigmentation as SLC24A5, a solute carrier that appeared to be required for melanin production, and confirmed its function with a Morpholino knockdown. The orthologous gene was then characterized in humans and a one base pair difference was found to strongly segregate fair-skinned Europeans and dark-skinned Africans. Zebrafish with the nacre mutation have since been bred with fish with a roy orbison (roy) mutation to make Casper strain fish that have no melanophores or iridophores, and are transparent into adulthood. These fish are characterized by uniformly pigmented eyes and translucent skin.

==== Transgenesis ====
Transgenesis is a popular approach to study the function of genes in zebrafish. Construction of transgenic zebrafish is rather easy by a method using the Tol2 transposon system. Tol2 element which encodes a gene for a fully functional transposase capable of catalyzing transposition in the zebrafish germ lineage. Tol2 is the only natural DNA transposable element in vertebrates from which an autonomous member has been identified. Examples include the artificial interaction produced between LEF1 and Catenin beta-1/β-catenin/CTNNB1. Dorsky et al. 2002 investigated the developmental role of Wnt by transgenically expressing a Lef1/β-catenin reporter. The Tol2 transposon system was used to develop transgenic zebrafish as sensitive biosensors for heavy metal detection. This involved creating a transgenic zebrafish line expressing a fluorescent protein under the control of a heavy metal-responsive promoter, enabling the detection of low concentrations of cadmium (Cd2+) and zinc (Zn2+).

There are well-established protocols for editing zebrafish genes using CRISPR-Cas9 and this tool has been used to generate genetically modified models.

==== Transparent adult bodies ====
In 2008, researchers at Boston Children's Hospital developed a new strain of zebrafish, named Casper, whose adult bodies had transparent skin. This allows for detailed visualization of cellular activity, circulation, metastasis and many other phenomena. In 2019 researchers published a crossing of a prkdc^{-/-} and a IL2rga^{-/-} strain that produced transparent, immunodeficient offspring, lacking natural killer cells as well as B- and T-cells. This strain can be adapted to 37 °C (99 °F) warm water and the absence of an immune system makes the use of patient derived xenografts possible. In January 2013, Japanese scientists genetically modified a transparent zebrafish specimen to produce a visible glow during periods of intense brain activity.

==== RNA splicing ====
In 2015, researchers at Brown University discovered that 10% of zebrafish genes do not need to rely on the U2AF2 protein to initiate RNA splicing. These genes have the DNA base pairs AC and TG as repeated sequences at the ends of each intron. On the 3'ss (3' splicing site), the base pairs adenine and cytosine alternate and repeat, and on the 5'ss (5' splicing site), their complements thymine and guanine alternate and repeat as well. They found that there was less reliance on U2AF2 protein than in humans, in which the protein is required for the splicing process to occur. The pattern of repeating base pairs around introns that alters RNA secondary structure was found in other teleosts, but not in tetrapods. This indicates that an evolutionary change in tetrapods may have led to humans relying on the U2AF2 protein for RNA splicing while these genes in zebrafish undergo splicing regardless of the presence of the protein.

==== Orthology ====
D. rerio has three transferrins, all of which cluster closely with other vertebrates.

=== Inbreeding depression ===
When close relatives mate, progeny may exhibit the detrimental effects of inbreeding depression. Inbreeding depression is predominantly caused by the homozygous expression of recessive deleterious alleles. For zebrafish, inbreeding depression might be expected to be more severe in stressful environments, including those caused by anthropogenic pollution. Exposure of zebrafish to environmental stress induced by the chemical clotrimazole, an imidazole fungicide used in agriculture and in veterinary and human medicine, amplified the effects of inbreeding on key reproductive traits. Embryo viability was significantly reduced in inbred exposed fish and there was a tendency for inbred males to sire fewer offspring.

=== Aquaculture research ===
Zebrafish are common models for research into fish farming, including pathogens and parasites causing yield loss or spreading to adjacent wild populations.

This usefulness is less than it might be due to Danio's taxonomic distance from the most common aquaculture species. Because the most common are salmonids and cod in the Protacanthopterygii and sea bass, sea bream, tilapia, and flatfish, in the Percomorpha, zebrafish results may not be perfectly applicable. Various other models – Goldfish (Carassius auratus), Medaka (Oryzias latipes), Stickleback (Gasterosteus aculeatus), Roach (Rutilus rutilus), Pufferfish (Takifugu rubripes), Swordtail (Xiphophorus hellerii) – are less used normally but would be closer to particular target species.

The only exception are the Carp (including Grass Carp, Ctenopharyngodon idella) and Milkfish (Chanos chanos) which are quite close, both being in the Cyprinidae. However it should also be noted that Danio consistently proves to be a useful model for mammals in many cases and there is dramatically more genetic distance between them than between Danio and any farmed fish.

=== Neurochemistry ===
In a glucocorticoid receptor-defective mutant with reduced exploratory behavior, fluoxetine rescued the normal exploratory behavior. This demonstrates relationships between glucocorticoids, fluoxetine, and exploration in this fish.

=== DNA repair ===
Zebrafish have been used as a model for studying DNA repair pathways. Embryos of externally fertilized fish species, such as zebrafish during their development, are directly exposed to environmental conditions such as pollutants and reactive oxygen species that may cause damage to their DNA. To cope with such DNA damages, a variety of different DNA repair pathways are expressed during development. Zebrafish have, in recent years, proven to be a useful model for assessing environmental pollutants that might cause DNA damage.

== Psychology ==
In 2015, a study was published about zebrafishes' capacity for episodic memory. The individuals showed a capacity to remember context with respect to objects, locations and occasions (what, when, where). Episodic memory is a capacity of explicit memory systems, typically associated with conscious experience.

Zebrafish are social animals as adults, existing in groups that exhibit shoaling, schooling and escape behaviors. Social preference emerges around 3 weeks of life, when juvenile zebrafish begin to prefer compartments that place them within view of other zebrafish. Other social behaviors include recognizing conspecifics, members of the same species, same-sex aggression, and mating.

The Mauthner cells integrate a wide array of sensory stimuli to produce the escape reflex. Those stimuli are found to include the lateral line signals by McHenry et al. 2009 and visual signals consistent with looming objects by Temizer et al. 2015, Dunn et al. 2016, and Yao et al. 2016.

== Drug discovery and development ==
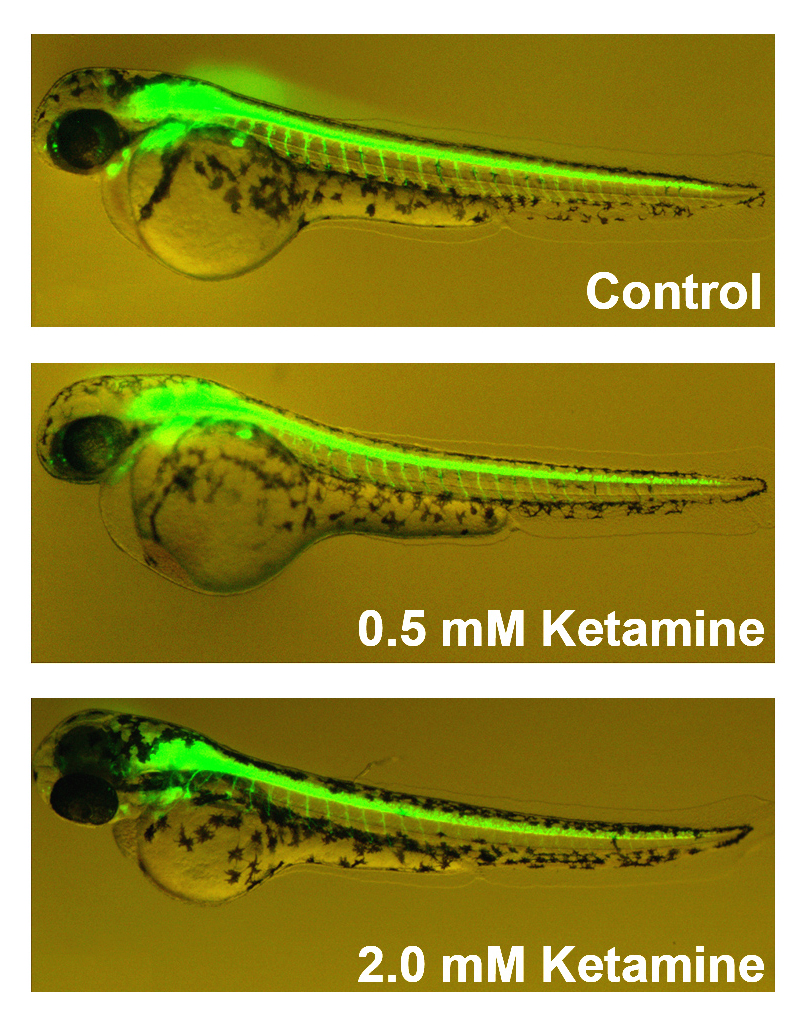
FDA research used zebrafish to show the effects of ketamine on neurological development.

The zebrafish and zebrafish larva is a suitable model organism for drug discovery and development. As a vertebrate with 70% genetic homology with humans, it can be predictive of human health and disease, while its small size and fast development facilitates experiments on a larger and quicker scale than with more traditional in vivo studies, including the development of higher-throughput, automated investigative tools. As demonstrated through ongoing research programmes, the zebrafish model enables researchers not only to identify genes that might underlie human disease, but also to develop novel therapeutic agents in drug discovery programmes. Zebrafish embryos have proven to be a rapid, cost-efficient, and reliable teratology assay model.

=== Drug screens ===
Drug screens in zebrafish can be used to identify novel classes of compounds with biological effects, or to repurpose existing drugs for novel uses; an example of the latter would be a screen which found that a commonly used statin (rosuvastatin) can suppress the growth of prostate cancer. To date, 65 small-molecule screens have been carried out and at least one has led to clinical trials. Within these screens, many technical challenges remain to be resolved, including differing rates of drug absorption resulting in levels of internal exposure that cannot be extrapolated from the water concentration, and high levels of natural variation between individual animals.

=== Toxico- or pharmacokinetics ===
To understand drug effects, the internal drug exposure is essential, as this drives the pharmacological effect. Translating experimental results from zebrafish to higher vertebrates (like humans) requires concentration-effect relationships, which can be derived from pharmacokinetic and pharmacodynamic analysis. Because of its small size, however, it is very challenging to quantify the internal drug exposure. Traditionally multiple blood samples would be drawn to characterize the drug concentration profile over time, but this technique remains to be developed. To date, only a single pharmacokinetic model for paracetamol has been developed in zebrafish larvae.

In January 2007, Chinese researchers at Fudan University genetically modified zebrafish to detect oestrogen pollution in lakes and rivers, which is linked to male infertility. The researchers cloned oestrogen-sensitive genes and injected them into the fertile eggs of zebrafish. The modified fish turned green if placed into water that was polluted by oestrogen.

=== Computational data analysis ===
Using smart data analysis methods, pathophysiological and pharmacological processes can be understood and subsequently translated to higher vertebrates, including humans. An example is the use of systems pharmacology, which is the integration of systems biology and pharmacometrics. Systems biology characterizes (part of) an organism by a mathematical description of all relevant processes. These can be for example different signal transduction pathways that upon a specific signal lead to a certain response. By quantifying these processes, their behaviour in healthy and diseased situation can be understood and predicted. Pharmacometrics uses data from preclinical experiments and clinical trials to characterize the pharmacological processes that are underlying the relation between the drug dose and its response or clinical outcome. These can be for example the drug absorption in or clearance from the body, or its interaction with the target to achieve a certain effect. By quantifying these processes, their behaviour after different doses or in different patients can be understood and predicted to new doses or patients. By integrating these two fields, systems pharmacology has the potential to improve the understanding of the interaction of the drug with the biological system by mathematical quantification and subsequent prediction to new situations, like new drugs or new organisms or patients. Using these computational methods, the previously mentioned analysis of paracetamol internal exposure in zebrafish larvae showed reasonable correlation between paracetamol clearance in zebrafish with that of higher vertebrates, including humans.

== Medical research ==
=== Cancer ===
Zebrafish have been used to make several transgenic models of cancer, including melanoma, leukemia, pancreatic cancer and hepatocellular carcinoma. Zebrafish expressing mutated forms of either the BRAF or NRAS oncogenes develop melanoma when placed onto a p53 deficient background. Histologically, these tumors strongly resemble the human disease, are fully transplantable, and exhibit large-scale genomic alterations. The BRAF melanoma model was utilized as a platform for two screens published in March 2011 in the journal Nature. In one study, the model was used as a tool to understand the functional importance of genes known to be amplified and overexpressed in human melanoma. One gene, SETDB1, markedly accelerated tumor formation in the zebrafish system, demonstrating its importance as a new melanoma oncogene. This was particularly significant because SETDB1 is known to be involved in the epigenetic regulation that is increasingly appreciated to be central to tumor cell biology.

In another study, an effort was made to therapeutically target the genetic program present in the tumor's origin neural crest cell using a chemical screening approach. This revealed that an inhibition of the DHODH protein (by a small molecule called leflunomide) prevented development of the neural crest stem cells which ultimately give rise to melanoma via interference with the process of transcriptional elongation. Because this approach would aim to target the "identity" of the melanoma cell rather than a single genetic mutation, leflunomide may have utility in treating human melanoma.

=== Cardiovascular disease ===
In cardiovascular research, the zebrafish has been used to model human myocardial infarction model. The zebrafish heart completely regenerates after about 2 months of injury without any scar formation. The Alpha-1 adrenergic signalling mechanism involved in this process was identified in a 2023 study. Zebrafish is also used as a model for blood clotting, blood vessel development, and congenital heart and kidney disease.

=== Immune system ===
In programmes of research into acute inflammation, a major underpinning process in many diseases, researchers have established a zebrafish model of inflammation, and its resolution. This approach allows detailed study of the genetic controls of inflammation and the possibility of identifying potential new drugs.

Zebrafish has been extensively used as a model organism to study vertebrate innate immunity. The innate immune system is capable of phagocytic activity by 28 to 30 h postfertilization (hpf) while adaptive immunity is not functionally mature until at least 4 weeks postfertilization.

=== Infectious diseases ===
As the immune system is relatively conserved between zebrafish and humans, many human infectious diseases can be modeled in zebrafish. The transparent early life stages are well suited for in vivo imaging and genetic dissection of host-pathogen interactions. Zebrafish models for a wide range of bacterial, viral and parasitic pathogens have already been established; for example, the zebrafish model for tuberculosis provides fundamental insights into the mechanisms of pathogenesis of mycobacteria. Other bacteria commonly studied using zebrafish and zebrafish larvae models include Clostridioides difficile, Staphylococcus aureus, and Pseudomonas aeruginosa. Furthermore, robotic technology has been developed for high-throughput antimicrobial drug screening using zebrafish infection models.

=== Repairing retinal damage ===
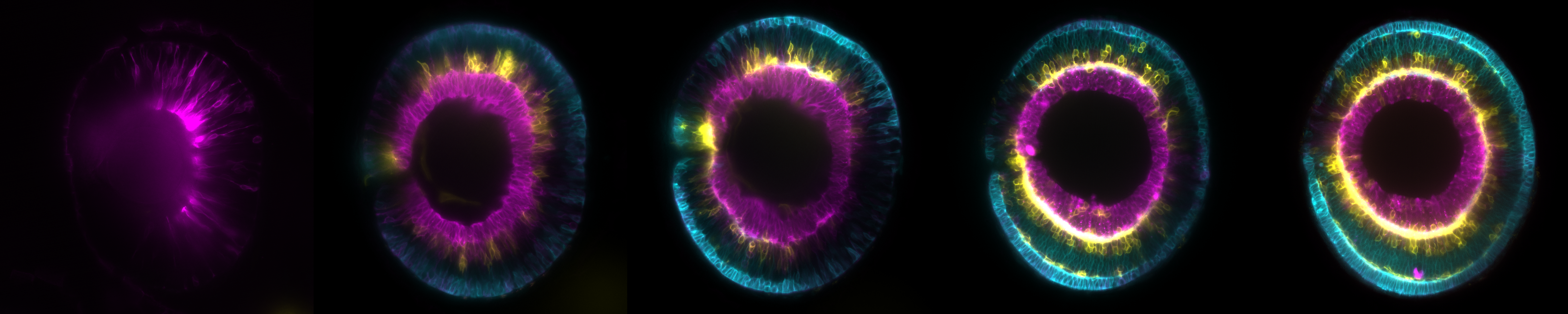
The development of a single zebrafish retina captured on a light sheet microscope approx. every 12 hours from 1.5 days to 3.5 days after birth of the embryo

Another notable characteristic of the zebrafish is that it possesses four types of cone cell, with ultraviolet-sensitive cells supplementing the red, green and blue cone cell subtypes found in humans. Zebrafish can thus observe a very wide spectrum of colours. The species is also studied to better understand the development of the retina; in particular, how the cone cells of the retina become arranged into the so-called 'cone mosaic'. Zebrafish, in addition to certain other teleost fish, are particularly noted for having extreme precision of cone cell arrangement.

This study of the zebrafish's retinal characteristics has also extrapolated into medical enquiry. In 2007, researchers at University College London grew a type of zebrafish adult stem cell found in the eyes of fish and mammals that develops into neurons in the retina. These could be injected into the eye to treat diseases that damage retinal neurons—nearly every disease of the eye, including macular degeneration, glaucoma, and diabetes-related blindness. The researchers studied Müller glial cells in the eyes of humans aged from 18 months to 91 years, and were able to develop them into all types of retinal neurons. They were also able to grow them easily in the lab. The stem cells successfully migrated into diseased rats' retinas, and took on the characteristics of the surrounding neurons. The team stated that they intended to develop the same approach in humans.

=== Muscular dystrophies ===
Muscular dystrophies (MD) are a heterogeneous group of genetic disorders that cause muscle weakness, abnormal contractions and muscle wasting, often leading to premature death. Zebrafish is widely used as model organism to study muscular dystrophies. For example, the sapje (sap) mutant is the zebrafish orthologue of human Duchenne muscular dystrophy (DMD). The Machuca-Tzili and co-workers applied zebrafish to determine the role of alternative splicing factor, MBNL, in myotonic dystrophy type 1 (DM1) pathogenesis. More recently, Todd et al. described a new zebrafish model designed to explore the impact of CUG repeat expression during early development in DM1 disease. Zebrafish is also an excellent animal model to study congenital muscular dystrophies including CMD Type 1 A (CMD 1A) caused by mutation in the human laminin α2 (LAMA2) gene. The zebrafish, because of its advantages discussed above, and in particular the ability of zebrafish embryos to absorb chemicals, has become a model of choice in screening and testing new drugs against muscular dystrophies.

- 10.1016/bs.mcb.2016.11.004

=== Bone physiology and pathology ===
Zebrafish have been used as model organisms for bone metabolism, tissue turnover, and resorbing activity. These processes are largely evolutionary conserved. They have been used to study osteogenesis (bone formation), evaluating differentiation, matrix deposition activity, and cross-talk of skeletal cells, to create and isolate mutants modeling human bone diseases, and test new chemical compounds for the ability to revert bone defects. The larvae can be used to follow new (de novo) osteoblast formation during bone development. They start mineralising bone elements as early as 4 days post fertilisation. Recently, adult zebrafish are being used to study complex age related bone diseases such as osteoporosis and osteogenesis imperfecta. The (elasmoid) scales of zebrafish function as a protective external layer and are little bony plates made by osteoblasts. These exoskeletal structures are formed by bone matrix depositing osteoblasts and are remodeled by osteoclasts. The scales also act as the main calcium storage of the fish. They can be cultured ex-vivo (kept alive outside of the organism) in a multi-well plate, which allows manipulation with drugs and even screening for new drugs that could change bone metabolism (between osteoblasts and osteoclasts).

=== Diabetes ===
Zebrafish pancreas development is very homologous to mammals, such as mice. The signaling mechanisms and way the pancreas functions are very similar. The pancreas has an endocrine compartment, which contains a variety of cells. Pancreatic PP cells that produce polypeptides, and β-cells that produce insulin are two examples of those such cells. This structure of the pancreas, along with the glucose homeostasis system, are helpful in studying diseases, such as diabetes, that are related to the pancreas. Models for pancreas function, such as fluorescent staining of proteins, are useful in determining the processes of glucose homeostasis and the development of the pancreas. Glucose tolerance tests have been developed using zebrafish, and can now be used to test for glucose intolerance or diabetes in humans. The function of insulin are also being tested in zebrafish, which will further contribute to human medicine. The majority of work done surrounding knowledge on glucose homeostasis has come from work on zebrafish transferred to humans.

=== Obesity ===
Zebrafish have been used as a model system to study obesity, with research into both genetic obesity and over-nutrition induced obesity. Obese zebrafish, similar to obese mammals, show dysregulation of lipid controlling metabolic pathways, which leads to weight gain without normal lipid metabolism. Also like mammals, zebrafish store excess lipids in visceral, intramuscular, and subcutaneous adipose deposits. These reasons and others make zebrafish good models for studying obesity in humans and other species. Genetic obesity is usually studied in transgenic or mutated zebrafish with obesogenic genes. As an example, transgenic zebrafish with overexpressed AgRP, an endogenous melanocortin antagonist, showed increased body weight and adipose deposition during growth. Though zebrafish genes may not be the exact same as human genes, these tests could provide important insight into possible genetic causes and treatments for human genetic obesity. Diet-induced obesity zebrafish models are useful, as diet can be modified from a very early age. High fat diets and general overfeeding diets both show rapid increases in adipose deposition, increased BMI, hepatosteatosis, and hypertriglyceridemia. However, the normal fat, overfed specimens are still metabolically healthy, while high-fat diet specimens are not. Understanding differences between types of feeding-induced obesity could prove useful in human treatment of obesity and related health conditions.

=== Environmental toxicology ===
Zebrafish have been used as a model system in environmental toxicology studies.

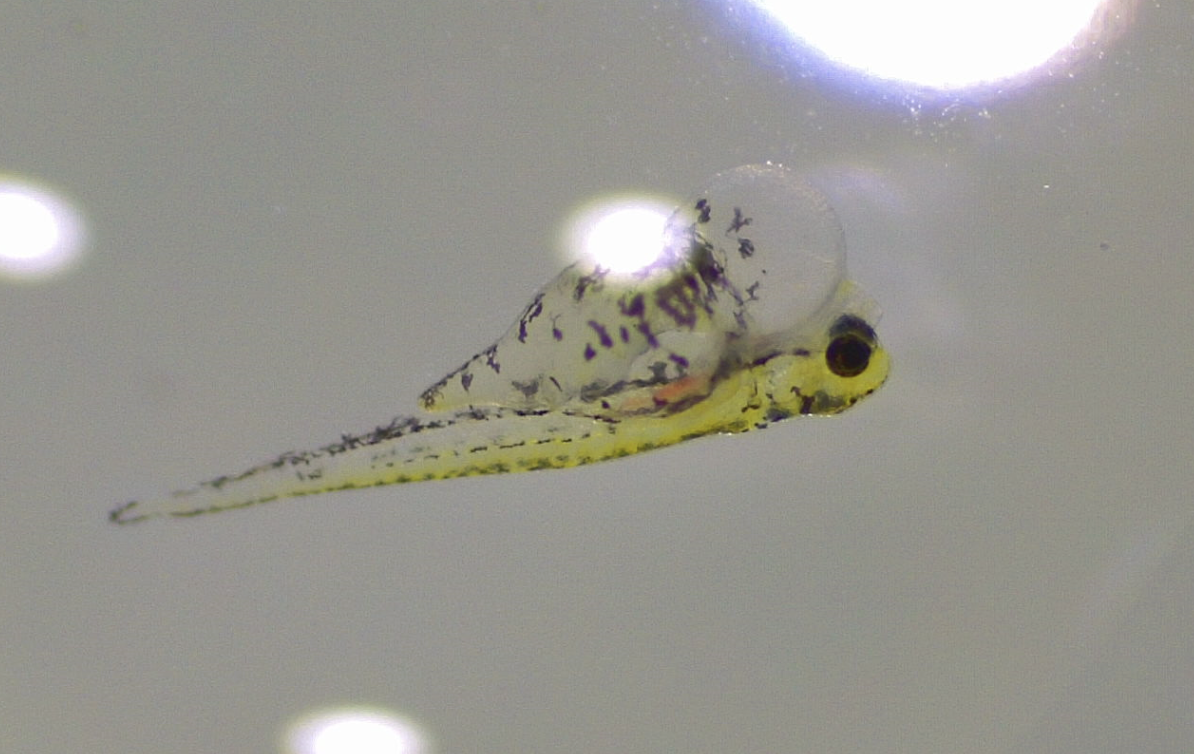
Danio rerio (zebrafish) embyro 6 days post fertilization treated with 10 μL of 1,4 Dioxane

=== Neurobiology ===
The combination of transparent zebrafish larva, light sheet fluorescence microscopy, and optical calcium indicators such as GCaMP, allow the monitoring of all neurons in an awake, behaving animal.

A particular scientific advantage of an optically transparent organism is that it allows neural activity recordings (typically calcium imaging) to be performed in the same animal that will later be used for neural circuit reconstruction. This allows researchers to bypass many of the animal-to-animal variability problems caused in trying to correlate the behavior observed in one animal with the reconstructed circuitry of different animal.

=== Epilepsy ===
Zebrafish have been used as a model system to study epilepsy. Mammalian seizures can be recapitulated molecularly, behaviorally, and electrophysiologically, using a fraction of the resources required for experiments in mammals.

== See also ==
- Japanese rice fish or medaka, another fish used for genetic, developmental, and biomedical research
- List of freshwater aquarium fish species
- Denison barb
