= China Zebrafish Resource Center =

Nonprofit Organization in Wuhan

The China Zebrafish Resource Center (CZRC) is a non-profit organization located in 7 Donghu South Road, Wuhan, Focusing mainly on zebrafish resources. It was established in the Institute of Hydrobiology, Chinese Academy of Sciences, in October 2012, currently headed by the board chairman Meng Anming.

== Introduction ==
CZRC is a non-profit organization jointly supported by the Ministry of Science and Technology of China, and the Chinese Academy of Sciences. CZRC mainly focuses on collecting existing zebrafish resources and developing new lines and technologies, with the purpose of providing resources, technical and informational support for colleagues in China and overseas.

== Board of directors ==
Honorary board chairman: Zhu Zuoyan

Board chairman: Meng Anming

Board secretary-general and director: Sun Yonghua
