= Kaijiang County =

Kaijiang County 开江县 Kaikiang
- County
- Location in Sichuan
- Coordinates: 31°04′50″N 107°53′05″E
- Country: China
- Province: Sichuan
- Prefecture-level city: Dazhou
- County seat: Xinning Town

Area
  - Total: 1,032.55 km^{2} (398.67 sq mi)

Population (2020 census)
  - Total: 414,310
  - Density: 401.25/km^{2} (1,039.2/sq mi)
- Time zone: UTC+8 (China Standard)
- Website: www.kaijiang.gov.cn

Kaijiang County (simplified Chinese: 开江县; traditional Chinese: 開江縣; pinyin: Kāijiāng Xiàn) is a county in the east of Sichuan Province, China. It is under the administration of Dazhou city. It has a population of 414,310, of which 180,354 in the urban area.

Kaijiang was established in 553 and until 1914 it was named Xinning County (新宁县).

The county is known for breeding ducks and waterfowls, and for olive oil production. Culturally it has a strong tradition of feng shui.

== Administrative divisions ==
Kaijiang comprises 1 subdistrict, 11 towns and 1 township. The county seat is Xinning Town.

- Congcheng Subdistrict (淙城街道)
- Xinning Town (新宁镇)
- Pu'an Town (普安镇)
- Huilong Town (回龙镇)
- Yongxing Town (永兴镇)
- Jiangzhi Town (讲治镇)
- Gantang Town (甘棠镇)
- Renshi Town (任市镇)
- Guangfu Town (广福镇)
- Changling Town (长岭镇)
- Bamiao Town (八庙镇)
- Lingyan Town (灵岩镇)
- Meijia Township (梅家乡)

== Climate ==
Climate data for Kaijiang, elevation 468 m (1,535 ft), (1991–2020 normals, extremes 1981–present)
Month	Jan	Feb	Mar	Apr	May	Jun	Jul	Aug	Sep	Oct	Nov	Dec	Year
Record high °C (°F)	20.2 (68.4)	25.2 (77.4)	34.6 (94.3)	35.1 (95.2)	36.1 (97.0)	37.4 (99.3)	40.2 (104.4)	40.5 (104.9)	39.9 (103.8)	34.4 (93.9)	26.3 (79.3)	19.8 (67.6)	40.5 (104.9)
Mean daily maximum °C (°F)	9.3 (48.7)	12.3 (54.1)	17.2 (63.0)	22.8 (73.0)	26.3 (79.3)	29.0 (84.2)	32.3 (90.1)	32.6 (90.7)	27.5 (81.5)	21.5 (70.7)	16.5 (61.7)	10.6 (51.1)	21.5 (70.7)
Daily mean °C (°F)	5.9 (42.6)	8.3 (46.9)	12.4 (54.3)	17.6 (63.7)	21.4 (70.5)	24.4 (75.9)	27.4 (81.3)	27.2 (81.0)	23.0 (73.4)	17.5 (63.5)	12.6 (54.7)	7.3 (45.1)	17.1 (62.7)
Mean daily minimum °C (°F)	3.5 (38.3)	5.4 (41.7)	8.9 (48.0)	13.7 (56.7)	17.7 (63.9)	21.0 (69.8)	23.6 (74.5)	23.2 (73.8)	19.8 (67.6)	14.9 (58.8)	10.0 (50.0)	5.0 (41.0)	13.9 (57.0)
Record low °C (°F)	−4.0 (24.8)	−3.5 (25.7)	−1.6 (29.1)	4.4 (39.9)	9.1 (48.4)	14.2 (57.6)	16.5 (61.7)	16.1 (61.0)	11.5 (52.7)	1.8 (35.2)	−1.3 (29.7)	−4.4 (24.1)	−4.4 (24.1)
Average precipitation mm (inches)	17.8 (0.70)	20.8 (0.82)	56.9 (2.24)	100.5 (3.96)	163.7 (6.44)	200.7 (7.90)	192.7 (7.59)	145.0 (5.71)	164.1 (6.46)	119.8 (4.72)	57.6 (2.27)	21.1 (0.83)	1,260.7 (49.64)
Average precipitation days (≥ 0.1 mm)	8.8	8.5	11.9	13.3	14.8	14.7	13.3	11.2	13.2	14.1	10.8	9.4	144
Average snowy days	1.5	0.3	0.1	0	0	0	0	0	0	0	0	0.3	2.2
Average relative humidity (%)	82	78	75	76	77	80	77	73	78	83	84	84	79
Mean monthly sunshine hours	46.4	52.8	99.8	134.5	132.8	130.3	195.5	202.9	126.5	86.1	71.6	43.3	1,322.5
Percentage possible sunshine	14	17	27	34	31	31	46	50	34	25	23	14	29
Source: China Meteorological Administrationall-time July highAll-time Oct high All-time December record
