= Qu County =

Qu County 渠县
- County
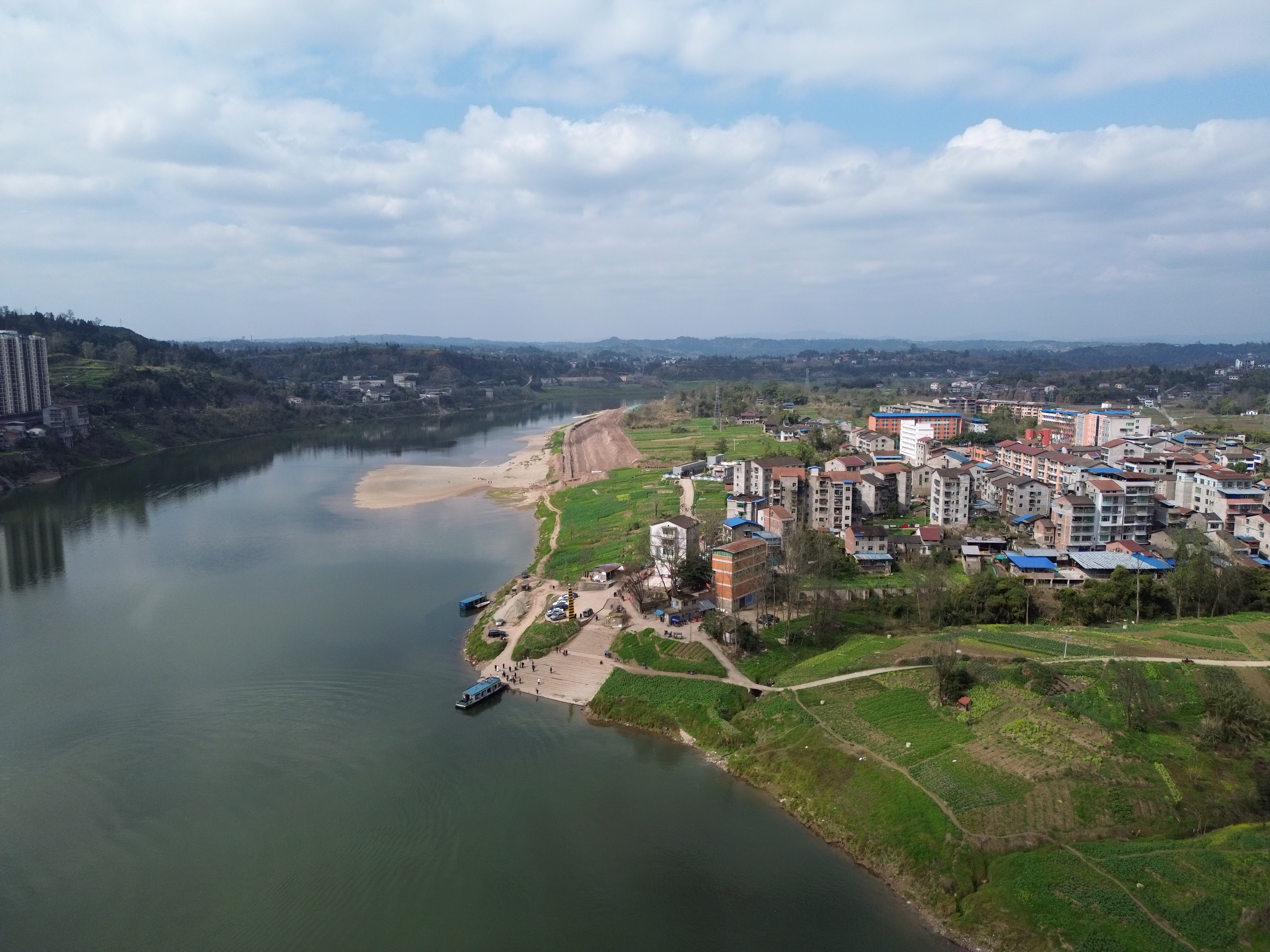

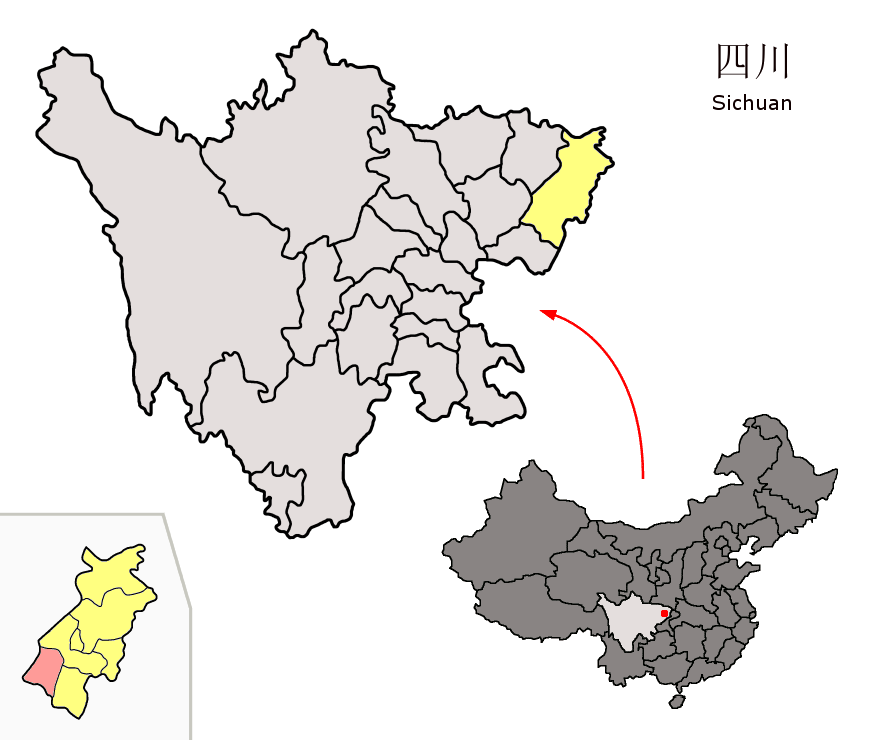
- Coordinates: 30°50′13″N 106°58′23″E
- Country: China
- Province: Sichuan
- Prefecture-level city: Dazhou

Area
  - Total: 2,013 km^{2} (777 sq mi)

Population (2020 census)
  - Total: 917,508
  - Density: 455.8/km^{2} (1,180/sq mi)
- Time zone: UTC+8 (China Standard)
- Postal code: 635200

Qu County or Quxian (simplified Chinese: 渠县; traditional Chinese: 渠縣; pinyin: Qú Xiàn) is a county in the northeast of Sichuan Province, China. It is the westernmost county-level division of the prefecture-level city of Dazhou.

== History ==
Formerly known as Dangqu (宕渠), the county is best known for historic monuments. Namely, a partially preserved mausoleum complex, featuring gate towers, or que, belonging to the Shen (沈) family, which dates back to the Han dynasty.

From 2014 to 2018, the Han dynasty site of Chengba (城坝遗址) near Tuxi in Qu county was excavated. A number of eave tiles with Chinese characters "dangqu" (宕渠) have been found, leading archaeologists to believe that this was the site of the Han dynasty city of Dangqu.

== Administrative divisions ==
Qu County comprises 3 subdistricts, 28 towns and 6 townships:

subdistricts

- Qujiang Subdistrict (渠江街道)
- Qunan Subdistrict (渠南街道)
- Tianxing Subdistrict (天星街道)

towns

- Linba Town (临巴镇)
- Tuxi Town (土溪镇)
- Sanhui Town (三汇镇)
- Wenchong Town (文崇镇)
- Yongxing Town (涌兴镇)
- Guifu Town (贵福镇)
- Yanfeng Town (岩峰镇)
- Jingbian Town (静边镇)
- Qingxichang Town (清溪场镇)
- Baocheng Town (宝城镇)
- Youqing Town (有庆镇)
- Xiandu Town (㶍渡镇)
- Langya Town (琅琊镇)
- Lidu Town (李渡镇)
- Zhongtan Town (中滩镇)
- Sanban Town (三板镇)
- Fengle Town (丰乐镇)
- Lifu Town (李馥镇)
- Heli Town (合力镇)
- Qinglong Town (青龙镇)
- Juandong Town (卷硐镇)
- Wangxi Town (望溪镇)
- Longfeng Town (龙凤镇)
- Xinshi Town (新市镇)
- Wanshou Town (万寿镇)
- Qubei Town (渠北镇)
- Dingyuan Town (定远镇)
- Dong'an Town (东安镇)

townships

- Bao'en Township (报恩乡)
- Anbei Township (安北乡)
- Dayi Township (大义乡)
- Juguang Township (巨光乡)
- Wangjiang Township (望江乡)
- Gongshi Township (拱市乡)

== Climate ==
Qu County has a monsoon-influenced humid subtropical climate (Köppen Cwa).

Climate data for Quxian, elevation 306 m (1,004 ft), (1991–2020 normals, extremes 1981–present)
Month	Jan	Feb	Mar	Apr	May	Jun	Jul	Aug	Sep	Oct	Nov	Dec	Year
Record high °C (°F)	19.8 (67.6)	22.6 (72.7)	34.3 (93.7)	37.0 (98.6)	37.3 (99.1)	37.6 (99.7)	42.8 (109.0)	44.0 (111.2)	42.5 (108.5)	35.9 (96.6)	25.7 (78.3)	18.6 (65.5)	44.0 (111.2)
Mean daily maximum °C (°F)	9.8 (49.6)	12.9 (55.2)	18.1 (64.6)	23.6 (74.5)	27.0 (80.6)	29.5 (85.1)	32.9 (91.2)	33.3 (91.9)	27.9 (82.2)	21.8 (71.2)	16.6 (61.9)	10.8 (51.4)	22.0 (71.6)
Daily mean °C (°F)	6.6 (43.9)	9.1 (48.4)	13.2 (55.8)	18.3 (64.9)	21.9 (71.4)	24.8 (76.6)	27.9 (82.2)	27.7 (81.9)	23.4 (74.1)	18.0 (64.4)	13.2 (55.8)	8.0 (46.4)	17.7 (63.8)
Mean daily minimum °C (°F)	4.4 (39.9)	6.3 (43.3)	9.8 (49.6)	14.4 (57.9)	18.3 (64.9)	21.5 (70.7)	24.2 (75.6)	23.8 (74.8)	20.3 (68.5)	15.6 (60.1)	11.0 (51.8)	6.1 (43.0)	14.6 (58.3)
Record low °C (°F)	−2.4 (27.7)	−1.3 (29.7)	0.5 (32.9)	4.0 (39.2)	9.5 (49.1)	14.1 (57.4)	18.3 (64.9)	17.3 (63.1)	12.8 (55.0)	4.1 (39.4)	0.7 (33.3)	−3.3 (26.1)	−3.3 (26.1)
Average precipitation mm (inches)	13.9 (0.55)	17.4 (0.69)	43.3 (1.70)	79.3 (3.12)	153.5 (6.04)	178.5 (7.03)	179.8 (7.08)	144.4 (5.69)	139.7 (5.50)	101.1 (3.98)	46.2 (1.82)	17.1 (0.67)	1,114.2 (43.87)
Average precipitation days (≥ 0.1 mm)	8.3	8.2	10.0	11.9	14.2	15.4	12.4	10.2	13.1	15.1	10.5	8.8	138.1
Average snowy days	0.6	0.1	0	0	0	0	0	0	0	0	0	0.1	0.8
Average relative humidity (%)	86	82	78	78	79	83	80	77	83	87	88	88	82
Mean monthly sunshine hours	33.8	43.5	91.2	126.0	128.7	121.7	187.7	193.6	110.2	66.6	52.2	32.3	1,187.5
Percentage possible sunshine	10	14	24	32	30	29	44	48	30	19	17	10	26
Source: China Meteorological Administrationall-time extreme temperatureall-time July record
