= Xuanhan County =

Xuanhan County 宣汉县 Suanhan
- County
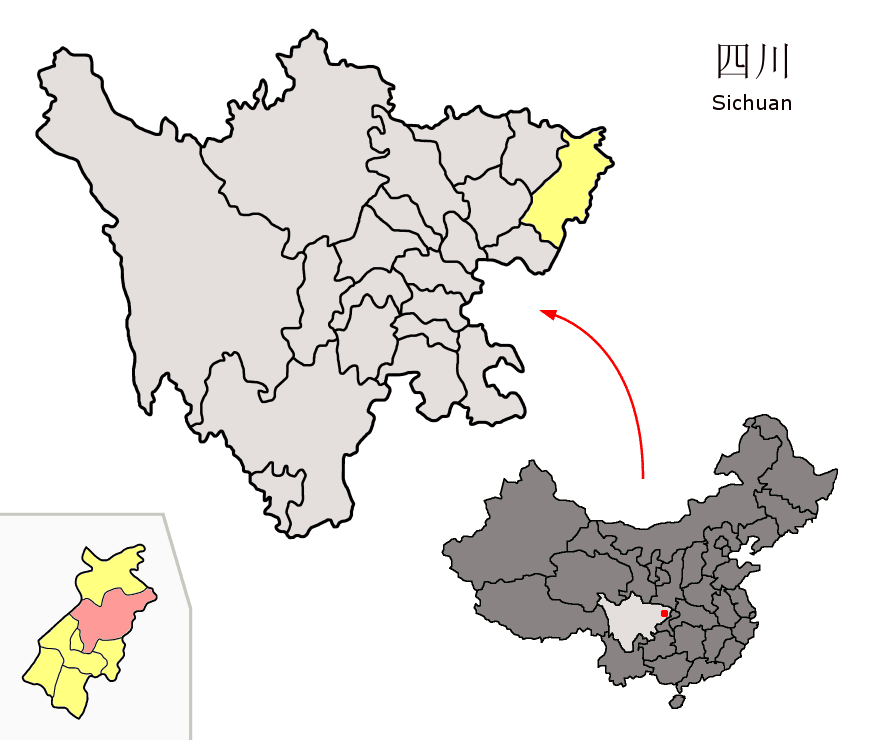
- Location of Xuanhan County (red) within Dazhou City (yellow) and Sichuan
- Country: China
- Province: Sichuan
- Prefecture-level city: Dazhou

Area
  - Total: 4,271 km^{2} (1,649 sq mi)

Population (2020 census)
  - Total: 954,090
  - Density: 223.4/km^{2} (578.6/sq mi)
- Time zone: UTC+8 (China Standard)

Xuanhan County (simplified Chinese: 宣汉县; traditional Chinese: 宣漢縣; pinyin: Xuānhàn Xiàn) is a county in the northeast of Sichuan Province, China, bordering Chongqing to the east. It is under the administration of the prefecture-level city of Dazhou.

According to recent population census, Xuanhan county has a population of about 954,000 people (2020).

The town of Xuanhan is located in the valley of a river called Zhouhe. The town is surrounded by mountains. Because of its location in the loop of the river the town of Xuanhan is quite oblong. Besides from the very populated centre of the Xuanhan county, Xuanhan contains many mountains and much natural landscapes.

== History ==
Xuanhan County was called Dongxiang County (simplified Chinese: 东乡县; traditional Chinese: 東鄉縣) from the 8th year of the Emperor He of Han (Yongyuan era, A.D. 96) until 1913. In 1914, after the establishment of the Republic of China, the county changed its name to Xuanhan County.

== Administrative divisions ==
Xuanhan County comprises 2 subdistricts, 28 towns, 3 townships and 4 ethnic townships:

subdistricts

- Dongxiang Subdistrict (东乡街道)
- Pujiang Subdistrict (蒲江街道)

towns

- Juntang Town (君塘镇)
- Qingxi Town (清溪镇)
- Puguang Town (普光镇)
- Tiansheng Town (天生镇)
- Baishu Town (柏树镇)
- Bajiao Town (芭蕉镇)
- Nanba Town (南坝镇)
- Wubao Town (五宝镇)
- Fengcheng Town (峰城镇)
- Tuhuang Town (土黄镇)
- Huajing Town (华景镇)
- Fankuai Town (樊哙镇)
- Xinhua Town (新华镇)
- Huangjin Town (黄金镇)
- Hujia Town (胡家镇)
- Maoba Town (毛坝镇)
- Dacheng Town (大成镇)
- Xiaba Town (下八镇)
- Tahe Town (塔河镇)
- Chahe Town (茶河镇)
- Changxi Town (厂溪镇)
- Hongfeng Town (红峰镇)
- Baima Town (白马镇)
- Taohua Town (桃花镇)
- Maduguan Town (马渡关镇)
- Miao'an Town (庙安镇)
- Shangxia Town (上峡镇)
- Nanping Town (南坪镇)

townships

- Laojun Township (老君乡)
- Huangshi Township (黄石乡)
- Shitie Township (石铁乡)

ethnic townships

- Sandun Tujia Ethnic Township (三墩土家族乡)
- Qishu Tujia Ethnic Township (漆树土家族乡)
- Longquan Tujia Ethnic Township (龙泉土家族乡)
- Dukou Tujia Ethnic Township (渡口土家族乡)

== Transport ==
It will be served by Xuanhan South railway station and Fankuai railway station on Chongqing–Xi'an high-speed railway in the future.

== Climate ==
Climate data for Xuanhan, elevation 389 m (1,276 ft), (1991–2020 normals, extremes 1981–present)
Month	Jan	Feb	Mar	Apr	May	Jun	Jul	Aug	Sep	Oct	Nov	Dec	Year
Record high °C (°F)	19.8 (67.6)	25.7 (78.3)	33.4 (92.1)	35.9 (96.6)	37.2 (99.0)	37.8 (100.0)	40.3 (104.5)	41.9 (107.4)	39.6 (103.3)	34.5 (94.1)	26.9 (80.4)	17.8 (64.0)	41.9 (107.4)
Mean daily maximum °C (°F)	9.6 (49.3)	12.5 (54.5)	17.6 (63.7)	23.1 (73.6)	26.7 (80.1)	29.4 (84.9)	32.5 (90.5)	32.8 (91.0)	27.5 (81.5)	21.5 (70.7)	16.4 (61.5)	10.7 (51.3)	21.7 (71.1)
Daily mean °C (°F)	6.1 (43.0)	8.3 (46.9)	12.3 (54.1)	17.4 (63.3)	21.3 (70.3)	24.5 (76.1)	27.2 (81.0)	27.1 (80.8)	22.7 (72.9)	17.4 (63.3)	12.5 (54.5)	7.5 (45.5)	17.0 (62.6)
Mean daily minimum °C (°F)	3.8 (38.8)	5.5 (41.9)	8.8 (47.8)	13.5 (56.3)	17.6 (63.7)	21.1 (70.0)	23.6 (74.5)	23.3 (73.9)	19.7 (67.5)	14.9 (58.8)	10.2 (50.4)	5.5 (41.9)	14.0 (57.1)
Record low °C (°F)	−2.7 (27.1)	−2.9 (26.8)	−1.3 (29.7)	4.6 (40.3)	9.6 (49.3)	13.9 (57.0)	16.0 (60.8)	16.5 (61.7)	11.7 (53.1)	1.7 (35.1)	0.7 (33.3)	−3.7 (25.3)	−3.7 (25.3)
Average precipitation mm (inches)	14.4 (0.57)	18.2 (0.72)	48.1 (1.89)	97.4 (3.83)	152.0 (5.98)	182.6 (7.19)	231.9 (9.13)	160.8 (6.33)	156.7 (6.17)	117.9 (4.64)	50.8 (2.00)	17.5 (0.69)	1,248.3 (49.14)
Average precipitation days (≥ 0.1 mm)	7.7	8.1	10.8	12.5	14.6	14.1	13.2	11.8	13.1	13.9	10.3	8.5	138.6
Average snowy days	1.2	0.4	0	0	0	0	0	0	0	0	0	0.3	1.9
Average relative humidity (%)	82	79	76	77	78	81	80	77	81	85	85	84	80
Mean monthly sunshine hours	46.4	56.8	107.8	143.1	147.5	149.4	204.0	216.2	129.9	92.4	70.9	45.1	1,409.5
Percentage possible sunshine	14	18	29	37	35	35	47	53	35	27	23	14	31
Source: China Meteorological Administrationall-time extreme temperatureall-time July high
