= Dazhu County =

Dazhu County 大竹县 Tachu
- County
- Location in Sichuan
- Coordinates: 30.736°N 107.205°E
- Country: China
- Province: Sichuan
- Prefecture-level city: Dazhou

Area
  - County: 2,075 km^{2} (801 sq mi)

Population (2020)
  - County: 841,960
  - Density: 405.8/km^{2} (1,051/sq mi)
  - Urban: 383,959
- Time zone: UTC+8 (China Standard)

Dazhu (Chinese: 大竹; pinyin: Dàzhú) is a county of Sichuan Province, China. It is under the administration of Dazhou city. In 2020 it had a population of 841,960 of which 383,959 in the urban area.

Dazhu is known for its ramie, glutinous rice and for giant timber bamboo.

== Administrative divisions ==
Dazhu is subdivided into 3 subdistricts, 23 towns and 5 townships.

- Zhuyang Subdistrict (竹阳街道)
- Dongliu Subdistrict (东柳街道)
- Baita Subdistrict (白塔街道)
- Wumu Town (乌木镇)
- Tuanba Town (团坝镇)
- Yangjia Town (杨家镇)
- Qinghe Town (清河镇)
- Bailin Town (柏林镇)
- Shihe Town (石河镇)
- Zhonghua Town (中华镇)
- Shiqiaopu Town (石桥铺镇)
- Guanyin Town (观音镇)
- Zhoujia Town (周家镇)
- Shizi Town (石子镇)
- Wenxing Town (文星镇)
- Mama Town (妈妈镇)
- Gaoxue Town (高穴镇)
- Oujia Town (欧家镇)
- Miaoba Town (庙坝镇)
- Qingshui Town (清水镇)
- Yuehua Town (月华镇)
- Gaoming Town (高明镇)
- Tongjia Town (童家镇)
- Tiancheng (天城镇)
- Sihe Town (四合镇)
- Yongsheng Town (永胜镇)
- Chaoyang Township (朝阳乡)
- Anji Township (安吉乡)
- Badu Township (八渡乡)
- Yangtong Township (杨通乡)
- Chuanzhu Township (川主乡)

== Climate ==
Climate data for Dazhu, elevation 418 m (1,371 ft), (1991–2020 normals, extremes 1981–present)
Month	Jan	Feb	Mar	Apr	May	Jun	Jul	Aug	Sep	Oct	Nov	Dec	Year
Record high °C (°F)	19.3 (66.7)	23.2 (73.8)	33.6 (92.5)	35.2 (95.4)	36.4 (97.5)	37.4 (99.3)	39.9 (103.8)	42.2 (108.0)	39.9 (103.8)	34.0 (93.2)	26.2 (79.2)	17.8 (64.0)	42.2 (108.0)
Mean daily maximum °C (°F)	8.7 (47.7)	11.7 (53.1)	16.8 (62.2)	22.5 (72.5)	26.0 (78.8)	28.6 (83.5)	32.1 (89.8)	32.5 (90.5)	27.0 (80.6)	20.8 (69.4)	15.6 (60.1)	9.7 (49.5)	21.0 (69.8)
Daily mean °C (°F)	5.9 (42.6)	8.3 (46.9)	12.4 (54.3)	17.5 (63.5)	21.1 (70.0)	24.2 (75.6)	27.3 (81.1)	27.2 (81.0)	22.7 (72.9)	17.3 (63.1)	12.4 (54.3)	7.2 (45.0)	17.0 (62.5)
Mean daily minimum °C (°F)	3.8 (38.8)	5.7 (42.3)	9.2 (48.6)	13.8 (56.8)	17.6 (63.7)	20.8 (69.4)	23.6 (74.5)	23.3 (73.9)	19.7 (67.5)	14.9 (58.8)	10.2 (50.4)	5.3 (41.5)	14.0 (57.2)
Record low °C (°F)	−2.9 (26.8)	−1.5 (29.3)	0.1 (32.2)	4.2 (39.6)	9.3 (48.7)	13.0 (55.4)	16.9 (62.4)	17.0 (62.6)	12.2 (54.0)	2.5 (36.5)	−0.4 (31.3)	−4.7 (23.5)	−4.7 (23.5)
Average precipitation mm (inches)	19.2 (0.76)	22.3 (0.88)	56.5 (2.22)	97.2 (3.83)	166.2 (6.54)	197.4 (7.77)	185.4 (7.30)	149.3 (5.88)	152.1 (5.99)	116.5 (4.59)	55.9 (2.20)	22.5 (0.89)	1,240.5 (48.85)
Average precipitation days (≥ 0.1 mm)	10.1	9.4	11.6	13.3	15.3	15.4	12.8	11.0	13.1	15.7	11.7	10.7	150.1
Average snowy days	1.3	0.5	0	0	0	0	0	0	0	0	0	0.3	2.1
Average relative humidity (%)	87	82	79	79	80	83	80	76	82	88	88	88	83
Mean monthly sunshine hours	34.1	47.4	93.5	131.9	137.2	135.6	206.7	205.9	124.2	77.6	57.7	33.0	1,284.8
Percentage possible sunshine	11	15	25	34	32	32	48	51	34	22	18	11	28
Source: China Meteorological Administrationall-time July high

== Born in Dazhu ==
- Shen Zhonghou
- Meng Anming
