= Institute of Hydrobiology =

Chinese Academy of Sciences research institute

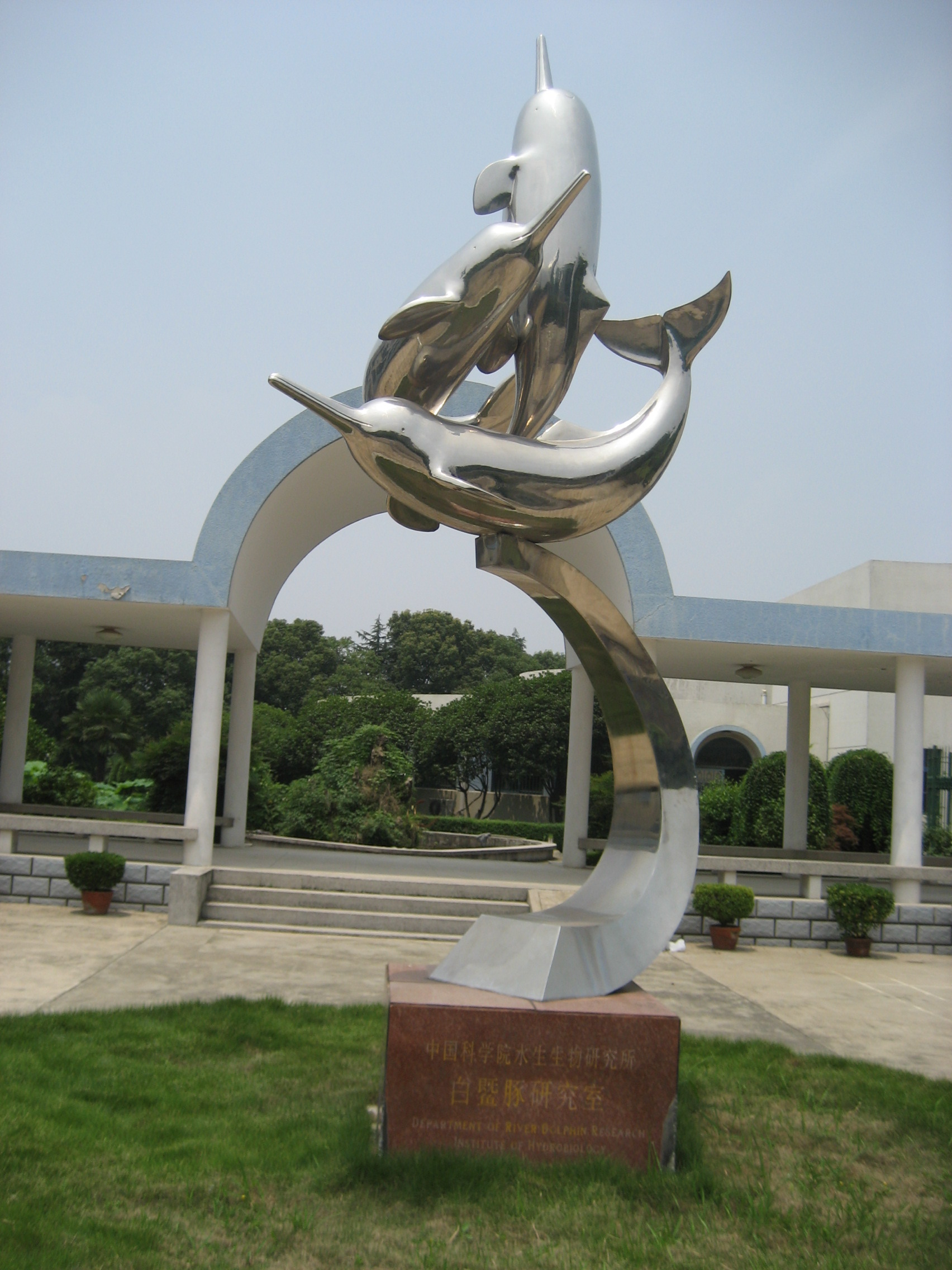
The entrance to the baiji dolphin department of the Wuhan Institute of Hydrobiology

The Institute of Hydrobiology, Chinese Academy of Sciences (Chinese: 中国科学院水生生物研究所) is a research institute located in Wuhan, Hubei, China. It was founded in 1950 and specializes in freshwater organisms. It is involved in the study of the finless porpoise and the now possibly extinct baiji dolphin. China Zebrafish Resource Center is housed in the institute campus. In 2014 the institute employed 292 scientists.

IHB is one of the oldest institutes for aquatic sciences in China, has made contributions to the advancement of aquatic sciences in China and globally.

== The Gallery ==
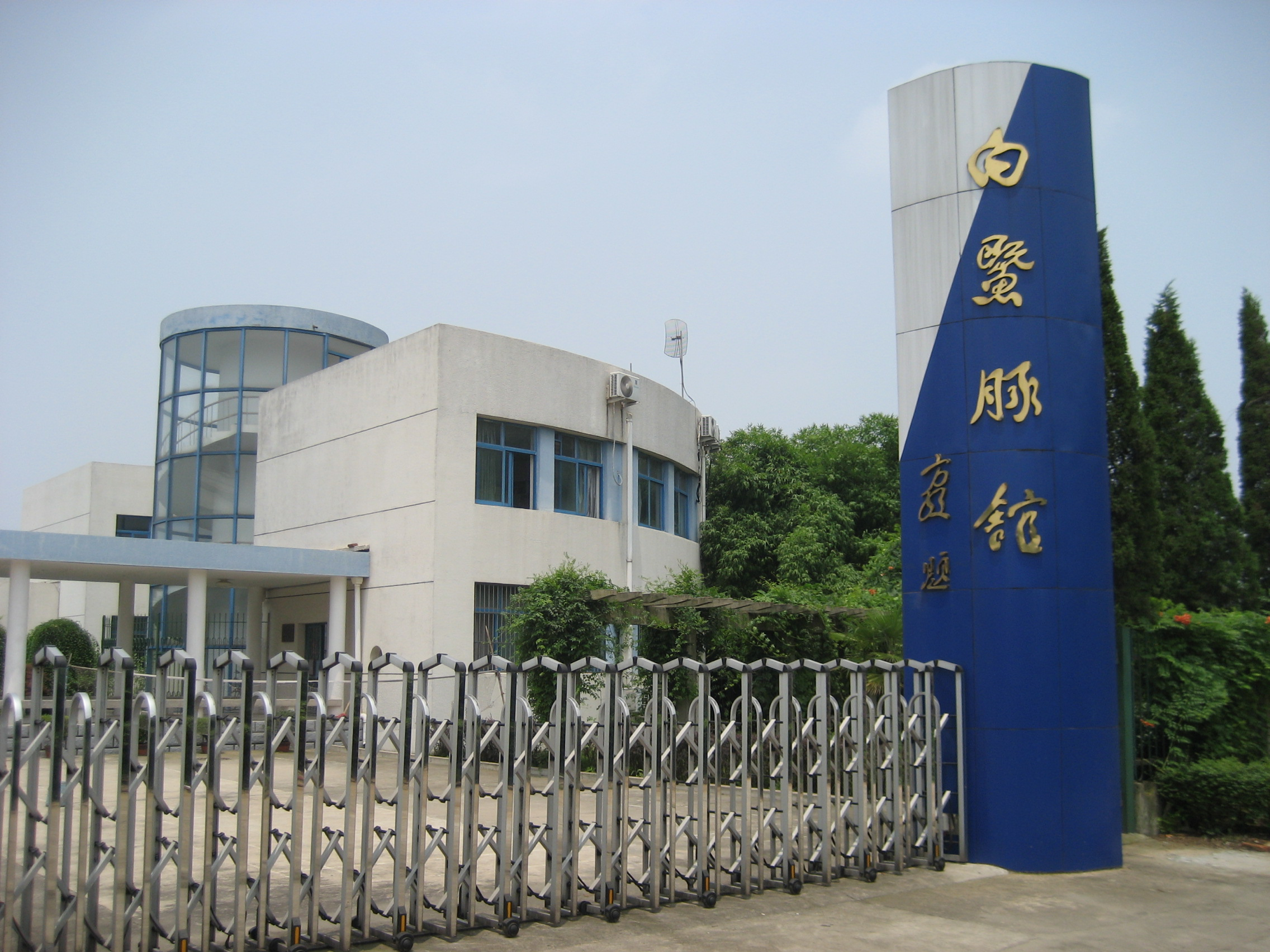
The entrance to Baiji Dolphin Hall of the Institute of Hydrobiology

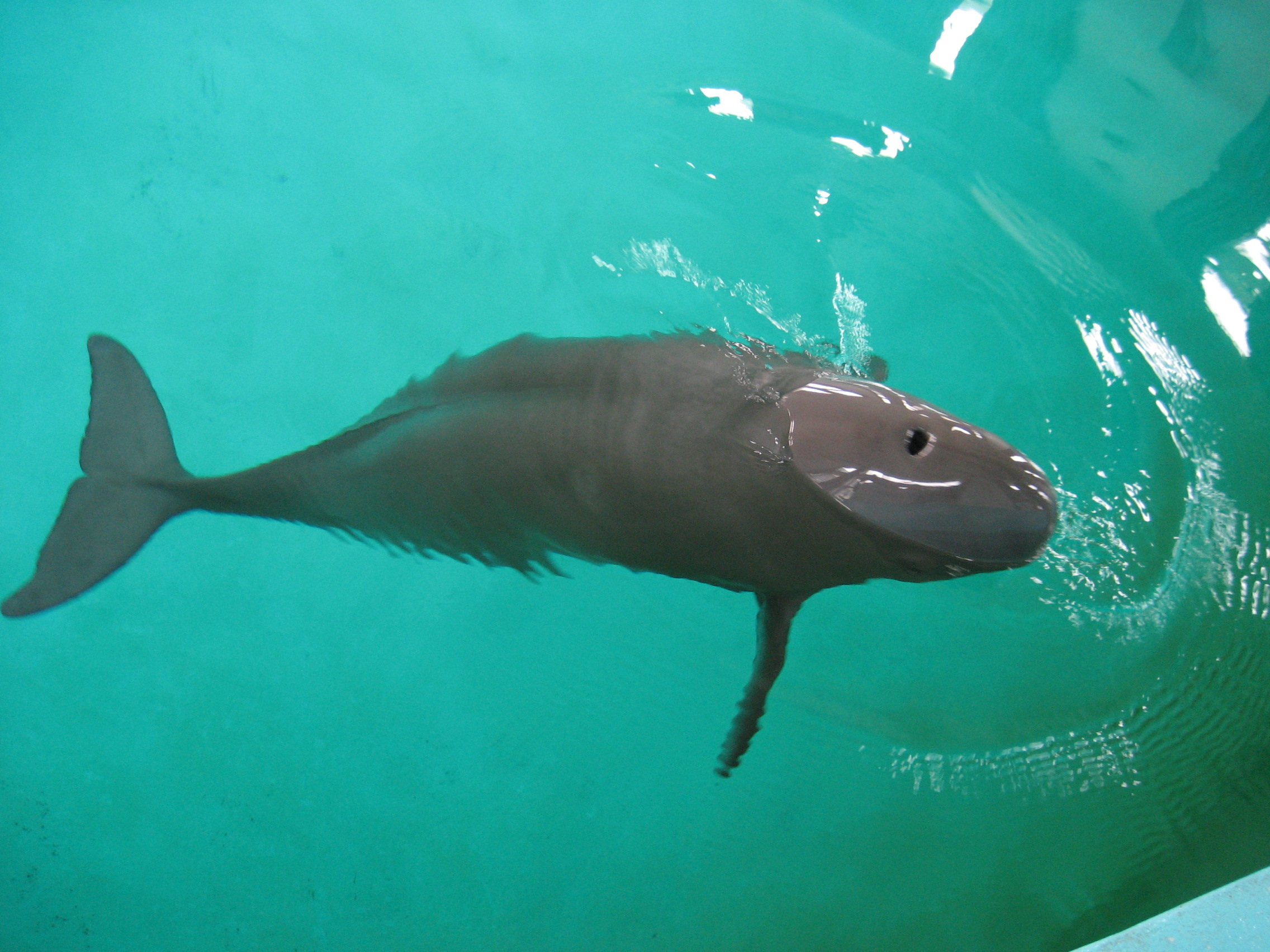
A finless porpoise swimming in the pool of Baiji Dolphin Hall

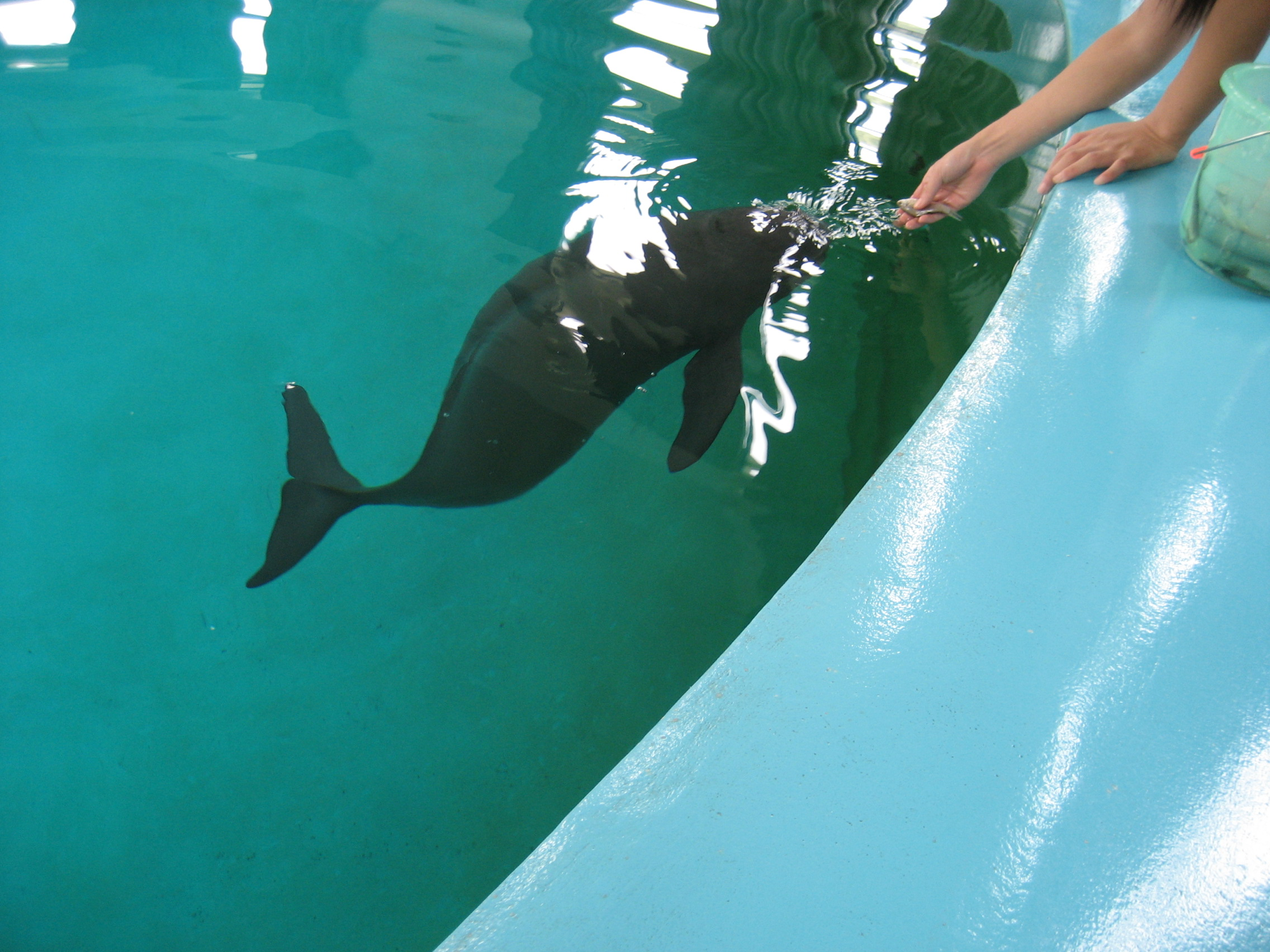
A finless porpoise being fed

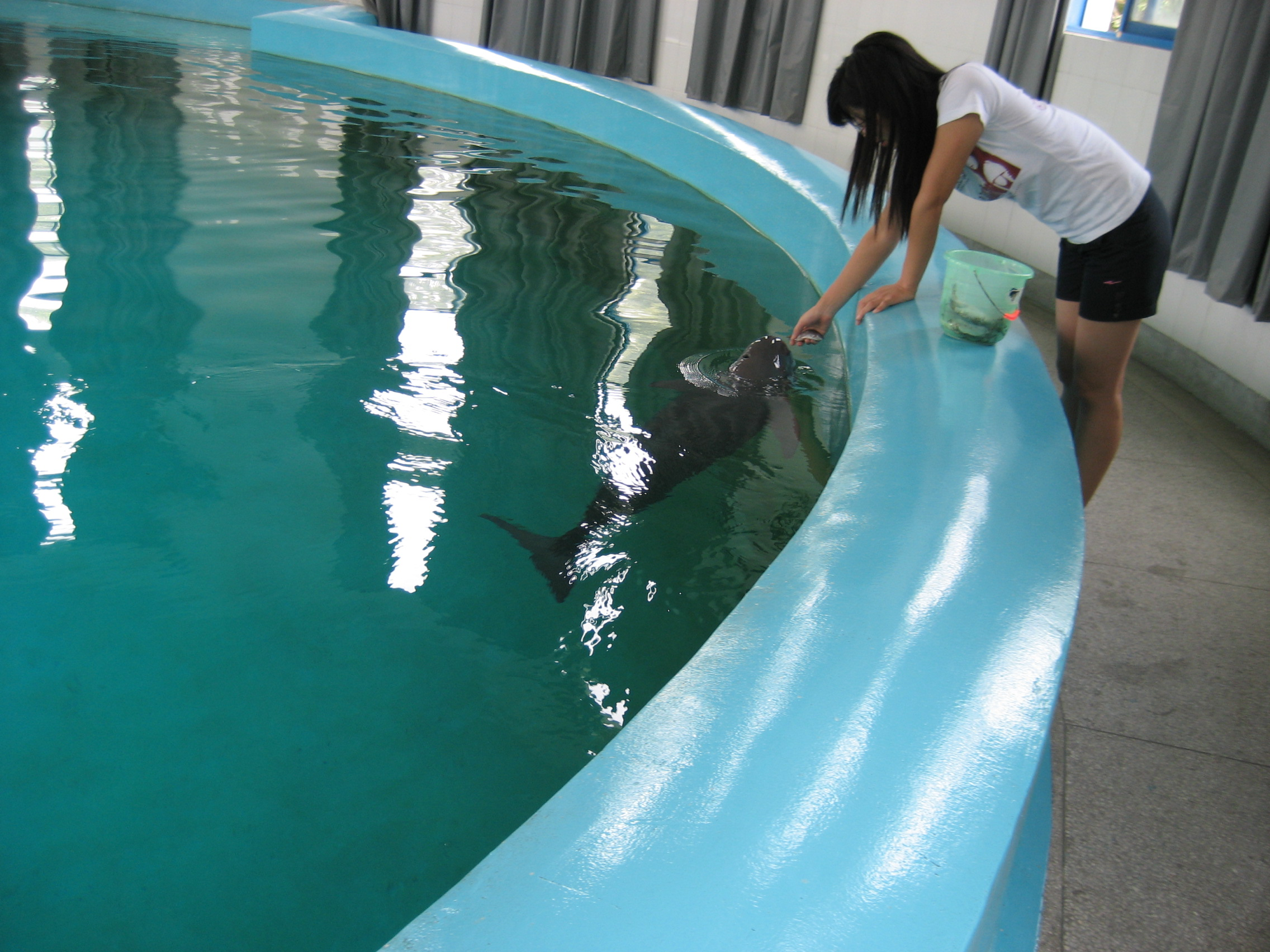
A researcher feeding a finless porpoise
