= Meng Anming =

Chinese biologist

- 孟安明
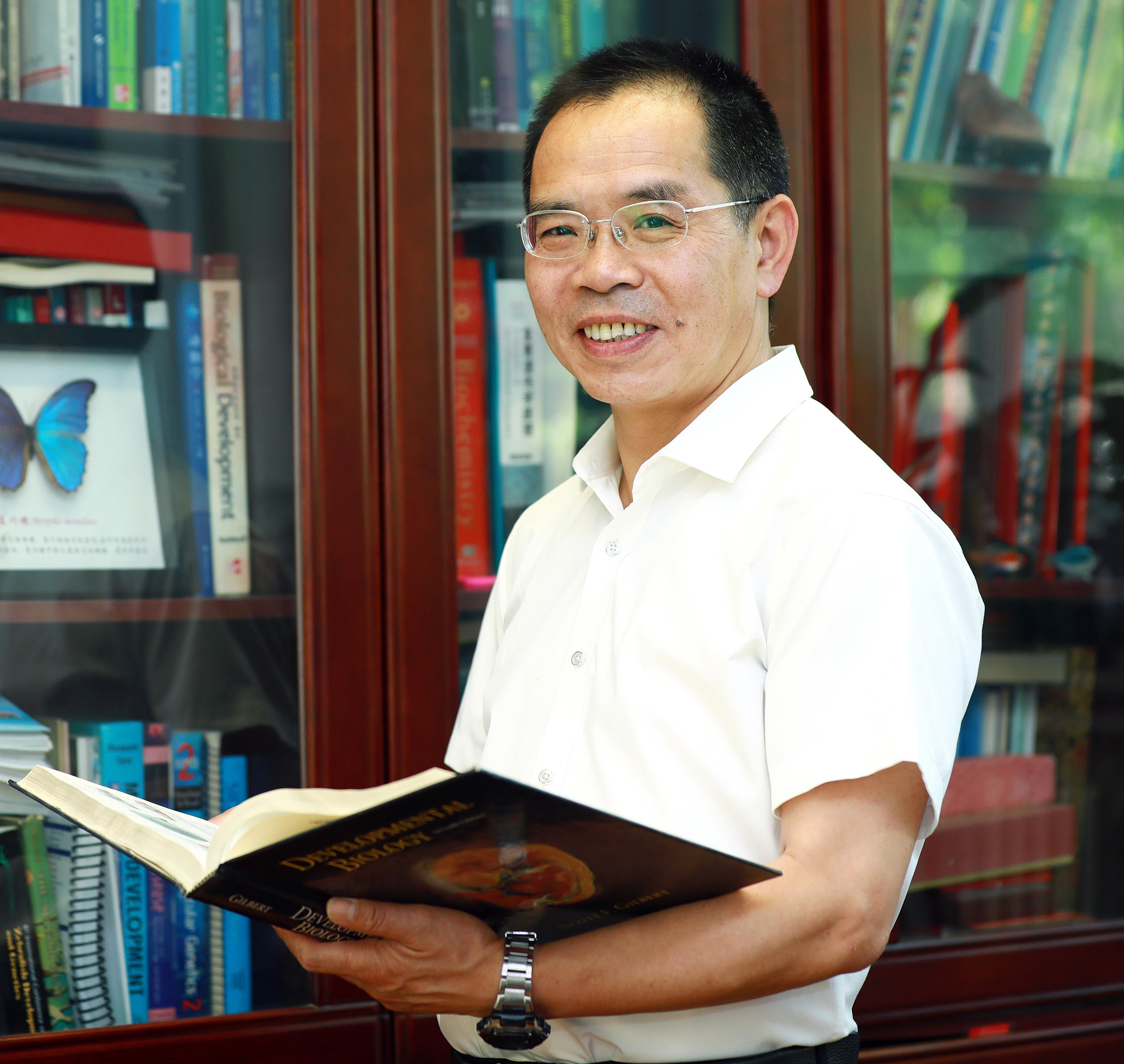
- Born: July 22, 1963 (age 63); Dazhu County, Sichuan
- Education: Southwest Agricultural University (now part of Southwest University) (BS); University of Nottingham (phD).
- Scientific career
- Fields: Developmental biology
- Workplaces: National Rice Research Institute of China; Beijing Agricultural University (now China Agricultural University); Tsinghua University; Institute of Zoology, Chinese Academy of Sciences.

Meng Anming (Chinese: 孟安明; born July 22, 1963, in Dazhu County, Sichuan Province) is a Chinese developmental biologist. In 1983 he graduated and received a bachelor degree in agronomy from Southwest Agricultural University (now part of Southwest University), China, followed by working as a research assistant in rice breeding group of the National Rice Research Institute of China. He pursued graduate study from May 1987 to November 1990 under supervision of Dr. David T. Parkin, focusing on investigation of genetic variations in wild birds using DNA fingerprinting, in Department of Genetics, University of Nottingham, UK, and received his Ph.D. degree in July 1991. From November 1990 to November 1992, he did postdoctoral research, working on DNA fingerprinting of farm animals, in the Teaching and Research Group of Animal Biochemistry, College of Biology, Beijing Agricultural University (now China Agricultural University), China, and was then recruited there as associate professor. In March 1996, he joined Dr. Shuo Lin's lab as visiting scholar and started to work on zebrafish embryonic development at the Institute of Molecular Medicine and Genetics, Medical College of Georgia, USA. He was recruited as full professor in August 1998 by Department of Biological Science and Technology (now School of Life Sciences), Tsinghua University, China. He was also director of the Institute of Zoology, the Chinese Academy of Sciences, from 2008 to 2012. In 2007 he was elected a member of Chinese Academy of Sciences, and in 2008 a member of TWAS.

== Research ==
Since 1996, Meng Anming has mainly used the zebrafish as a model system for study embryogenesis. In the mid to late 1990s, he and colleagues demonstrated for the first time the utility and efficiency of the GFP reporter for dissecting regulatory elements of genes in living organisms.

He established his own zebrafish lab at Tsinghua University in 1998, the very first one in China, and began with identification of region-specific expression genes in zebrafish embryos by whole-mount in situ hybridization. Then, his lab has focused on molecular mechanisms regulating cell fate and patterning of early vertebrate embryos and revealed functions of several important regulators and signaling pathways for mesendoderm induction and dorsoventral patterning as well as left-right asymmetry development in zebrafish embryos.

The Hans Spemann and Hild Mangold discovered the organizer of embryonic development in 1924. Until early 2000s, accumulated evidence had indicated that β-catenin signaling plays an essential role in the formation of the Spemann and Mangold organizer. However, how β-catenin signaling is activated remains unclear. Meng Anming and his coworkers discovered that a novel maternally expressed Huluwa, which encodes a transmembrane protein, activates β-catenin signaling for embryonic organizer and body axis formation in the zebrafish and frog by promoting Axin degradation. Their discovery solves a long-standing question in the field of developmental biology.

Recently, Meng Anming's lab disclosed the clock-like function of nuclear pore complex maturation for the onset of zygotic genome activation in zebrafish embryos. Besides, his lab discovered for the first time an indispensable role of the second polar body in setting up the initial cell fate asymmetry during pre-implantation period and in regulating post-implantation development in mouse embryos.

== Trainees ==
The majority of Dr. Meng's former graduates are still doing scientific research. Some of them have PI positions in universities or institutions such as the University of Texas MD Anderson Cancer Center, the Institute of Genetics and Developmental Biology, Tongji University, Chongqing University, Ocean University of China, Zhejiang University, Huazhong University of Science and Technology, Beijing Institute of Technology, Chongqing Medical University, Soochow University, and Minnan Normal University.

== Service in editorial boards ==
Meng Anming has served some scientific journals including:

- Journal of Genetics and Genomics, Advisory Board member (2007-);
- Cell Research: Editorial board member and advisory board member (2006-);
- Journal of Biological Chemistry, Editorial board member (2009-2013);
- Current Zoology, Editor in Chief (2009-2019);
- Journal of Cell Science, Editorial board member and advisory board member (2008-);
- BMC Development Biology, Editorial board member and advisory board member (2010-);
- Mechanisms of Development, Editorial board member and advisory board member (2011-);
- Open Biology, Associate editor (2012-);
- Journal of Molecular Cell Biology, Associate editor (2016-);
- Development, Advisory board member (2019-);
- National Science Reviews, Section editor (2023-2027);
- National Science Open, Executive editor-in-chief in Life Sciences and Medicine (2022-).

== Service in academic societies ==
He holds positions in some academic societies including:

- Chinese Society for Cell Biology, member of council (2003-2012);
- Asia Pacific Developmental Biology Network (APDBN), president of the Organizing Committee (2013-2015);
- Genetics Society of China, vice president (2013-2023);
- China Zoological Society, president (2014-2024), vice president (2004-2013);
- China Union of Life Science Societies, president (2022-2023).

== Awards ==
He has received awards such as:

- Outstanding Young Scholar, Hong Kong Qiu Shi Science & Technologies Foundation, 2000;
- Teaching and Research Award for University Outstanding Young Teachers, the Ministry of Education of China, 2000;
- China National Funds for Distinguished Young Scholars, 2000;
- Cheung Kong Scholar, the Ministry of Education of China and Li Kai Shing Foundation, Hong Kong, 2001;
- Prize for Science and Technology Advancement, the Ho Leung Ho Lee Foundation, 2007;
- Tan Jia Zhen Achievement Award in life sciences, Shanghai Biopharmaceutical Industry Association, 2012;
- Outstanding Accomplishment Award of the Chinese Society of Cell Biology, 2020;
- Lifetime Accomplishment Award in Zebrafish Research, the Chinese Society of Zebrafish Research, 2023.
