= Dazhou =

Dazhou 达州市 Tachow, Suiting
- Prefecture-level city
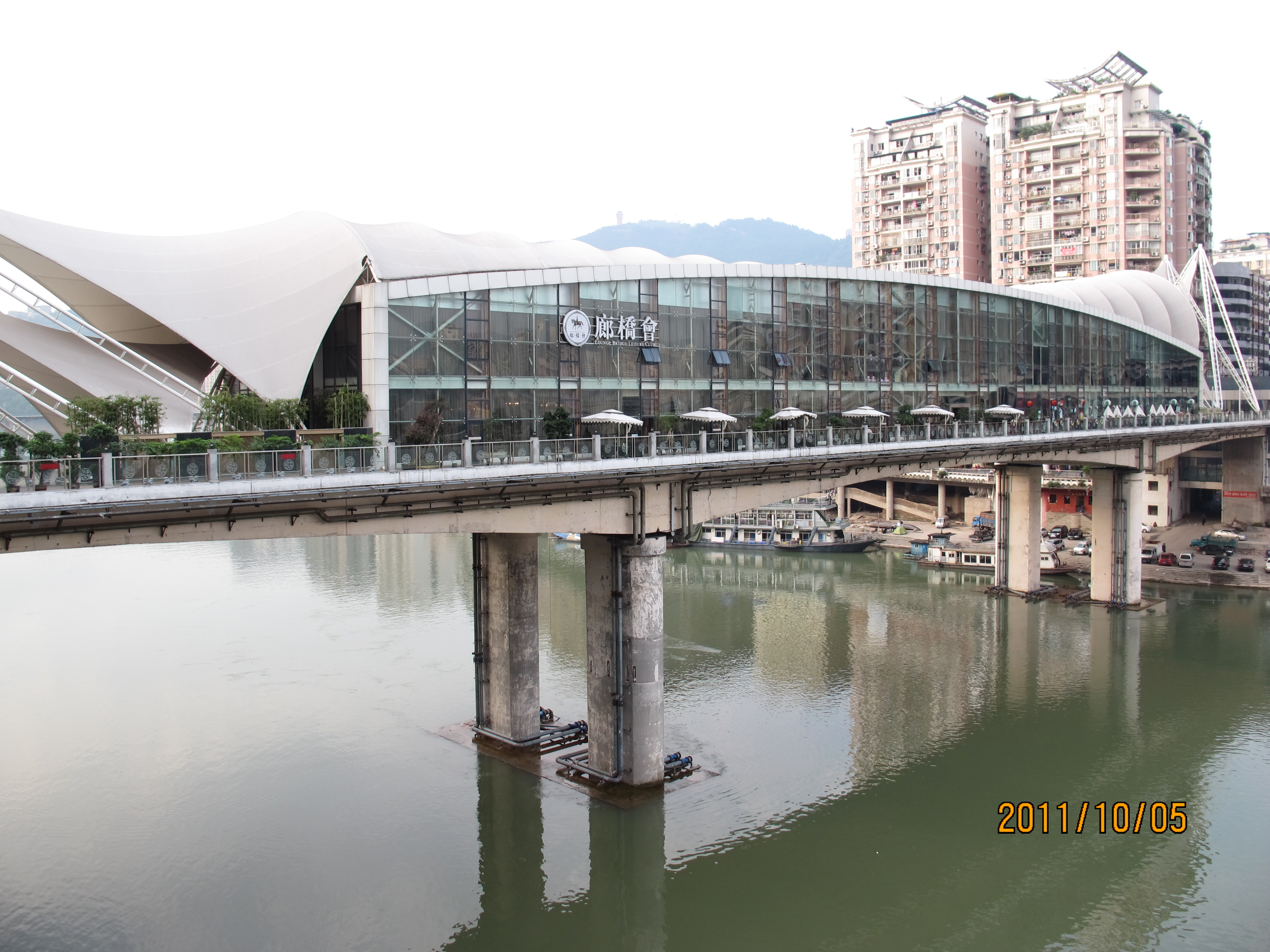
- Covered bridge

- Location of Dazhou City jurisdiction in Sichuan
- Coordinates (Dazhou municipal government): 31°12′33″N 107°28′04″E
- Country: People's Republic of China
- Province: Sichuan
- Municipal seat: Tongchuan District

Area
  - Prefecture-level city: 16,591 km^{2} (6,406 sq mi)
  - Urban: 3,137 km^{2} (1,211 sq mi)
  - Metro: 3,137 km^{2} (1,211 sq mi)

Population (2020 census)
  - Prefecture-level city: 5,385,422
  - Density: 324.60/km^{2} (840.71/sq mi)
  - Urban: 1,850,869
  - Urban density: 590.0/km^{2} (1,528/sq mi)
  - Metro: 1,850,869
  - Metro density: 590.0/km^{2} (1,528/sq mi)

GDP
  - Prefecture-level city: CN¥ 135.1 billion US$ 21.7 billion
  - Per capita: CN¥ 24,343; US$ 3,908
- Time zone: UTC+8 (China Standard)
- Postal code: 635000
- Area code: 0818
- ISO 3166 code: CN-SC-17
- Licence Plate Prefixes: 川S
- Administrative division code: 511700
- Website: www.dazhou.gov.cn/index.html

Dazhou (simplified Chinese: 达州; traditional Chinese: 達州; pinyin: Dázhōu; Wade–Giles: Ta-chou) is a prefecture-level city in the northeast of Sichuan province, China, bordering Shaanxi to the north and Chongqing to the east and south. At the end of 2024 and the beginning of 2025, the resident population will be 5,304,300, the urbanization rate is 52.72%, the urban population is 2.794 million, and the rural population is 2.506 million live in the built-up (or metro) area made of 2 urban districts.

== History ==
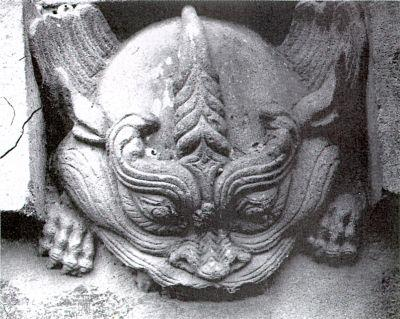
A taotie on the Han dynasty Shen family mausoleum (Mausoleum of the Prefect of Shen, 沈府君阙)

Dazhou's history goes back to the Eastern Han dynasty when in 90 AD it was made a county by the name of Liweizhou (历为州). Then until the Liao dynasty its name was Zaidi (在地). During the Liao and Tang dynasties its name was again changed, this time to Tongzhou (通州). Finally in the Song dynasty it was given its present name of Dazhou.

Notable people from Dazhou include the Three Kingdoms writer Chen Shou, Song dynasty astronomer Zhang Sixun, and Ming and Qing dynasty philosopher and educator Tang Zhen. Dazhou also made notable contributions to the Communist Revolution. Red Army heroes such as Xu Xiangqian, Li Xiannian, Xu Shiyou, Wang Weizhou (王维舟), and Zhang Aiping were all from or lived in Dazhou.

The partially preserved mausoleum complex of the Shen (沈) family in Qu County (particularly its gate towers known as que) built in the Han dynasty, is a well-known architectural monument.

== Geography and climate ==
Dazhou is the easternmost prefecture-level division of the province, bordering Ankang and Hanzhong (both in Shaanxi) to the north, Chengkou County, Kai County, and Wanzhou District of Chongqing to the east, the Chongqing counties of Liangping and Dianjiang to the south, Guang'an to the southwest, Nanchong to the west, and Bazhong to the northwest. It is centrally located between Chongqing and Xi'an. The area is 16,600 square kilometres (6,400 sq mi).

The terrain is largely mountainous (Daba Mountains and adjacent ranges).

Typical of the Sichuan Basin, Dazhou has a monsoon-influenced humid subtropical climate (Köppen Cwa) and is largely mild and humid, with four distinct seasons. Winter is short, mild, and foggy, though actual precipitation is low. January averages 6.1 °C (43.0 °F) and, while frost may occur, snow is rare. Summers are long, hot and humid, with highs often exceeding 33 °C (91 °F). The monthly daily average in July, the warmest month, is 27.4 °C (81.3 °F). Rainfall is light in winter and can be heavy in summer, and over 70% of the annual total occurs from May to September. The annual frost-free period lasts around 300 days.

Climate data for Dazhou, elevation 345 m (1,132 ft), (1991–2020 normals, extremes 1971–present)
Month	Jan	Feb	Mar	Apr	May	Jun	Jul	Aug	Sep	Oct	Nov	Dec	Year
Record high °C (°F)	20.1 (68.2)	24.9 (76.8)	32.1 (89.8)	35.5 (95.9)	37.6 (99.7)	38.7 (101.7)	41.2 (106.2)	42.5 (108.5)	41.0 (105.8)	35.2 (95.4)	29.0 (84.2)	18.6 (65.5)	42.5 (108.5)
Mean daily maximum °C (°F)	9.7 (49.5)	12.7 (54.9)	17.8 (64.0)	23.4 (74.1)	26.9 (80.4)	29.7 (85.5)	32.9 (91.2)	33.3 (91.9)	27.9 (82.2)	21.8 (71.2)	16.6 (61.9)	10.8 (51.4)	22.0 (71.5)
Daily mean °C (°F)	6.4 (43.5)	8.8 (47.8)	12.9 (55.2)	18.0 (64.4)	21.7 (71.1)	24.9 (76.8)	27.9 (82.2)	27.8 (82.0)	23.2 (73.8)	17.8 (64.0)	12.9 (55.2)	7.8 (46.0)	17.5 (63.5)
Mean daily minimum °C (°F)	4.2 (39.6)	6.1 (43.0)	9.5 (49.1)	14.2 (57.6)	18.0 (64.4)	21.5 (70.7)	24.2 (75.6)	23.9 (75.0)	20.2 (68.4)	15.3 (59.5)	10.5 (50.9)	5.8 (42.4)	14.5 (58.0)
Record low °C (°F)	−3.7 (25.3)	−1.7 (28.9)	−0.1 (31.8)	4.6 (40.3)	9.7 (49.5)	14.0 (57.2)	16.4 (61.5)	17.3 (63.1)	12.0 (53.6)	2.8 (37.0)	1.0 (33.8)	−4.5 (23.9)	−4.5 (23.9)
Average precipitation mm (inches)	15.8 (0.62)	19.8 (0.78)	49.3 (1.94)	93.7 (3.69)	165.0 (6.50)	185.1 (7.29)	197.0 (7.76)	147.5 (5.81)	150.9 (5.94)	105.9 (4.17)	49.4 (1.94)	19.2 (0.76)	1,198.6 (47.2)
Average precipitation days (≥ 0.1 mm)	7.8	8.1	10.5	11.7	14.2	14.2	12.8	11.1	12.4	13.3	9.9	8.0	134
Average snowy days	1.2	0.3	0.1	0	0	0	0	0	0	0	0	0.3	1.9
Average relative humidity (%)	80	76	73	74	76	79	76	73	79	83	83	82	78
Mean monthly sunshine hours	30.0	43.8	90.3	123.2	122.2	117.5	176.5	189.2	107.3	68.7	51.5	27.3	1,147.5
Percentage possible sunshine	9	14	24	32	29	28	41	47	29	20	16	9	25
Source 1: China Meteorological Administration all-time extreme temperatureNOAAall-time July high
Source 2: Weather China

== Administration ==
It is one of Sichuan's most populous cities with 5,468,097 residents as of 2010 census.

Map
Name	Hanzi	Hanyu Pinyin	Population (2010 census)	Area (km^{2})	Density (/km^{2})
Tongchuan District	通川区	Tōngchuān Qū	478,276	901	531
Dachuan District	达川区	Dáchuān Qū	1,111,159	2,236	497
Wanyuan City	万源市	Wànyuán Shì	407,594	4,045	101
Xuanhan County	宣汉县	Xuānhàn Xiàn	1,006,826	4,272	236
Kaijiang County	开江县	Kāijiāng Xiàn	430,877	1,030	418
Dazhu County	大竹县	Dàzhú Xiàn	876,884	2,077	422
Qu County	渠县	Qú Xiàn	1,156,481	2,019	573

== Economy ==
Dazhou is an important river and land transportation hub for the region. Numerous national highways, expressways, and rail lines pass through Dazhou connecting it directly with major cities in China such as Chengdu, Xi'an, Wuhan, Guangzhou, Shenzhen, Beijing, etc., making it one of Sichuan's important trade centers.

Dazhou has numerous natural resources including large natural gas fields and an abundance of mineral resources such as salt, coal, manganese, lithium, and limestone. Major agricultural products include pork, beef, and tea. Other industries are chemical production, coal power, metallurgy, textiles, building materials, and processed food.

== Tourism ==
Dazhou has both cultural and natural attractions. There are several national and provincial cultural sites and many national and provincial protected forests and nature reserves. Xuanhan's Baili Gorges have scenery and rapids, leading to the nickname "Little Three Gorges". Mountains are this area's greatest attraction.

Bashan Grand Canyon, formerly known as "Xuanhan Baili Gorge," is located in Xuanhan County, Dazhou City, Sichuan Province. It is designated as a national 4A-level tourist attraction, a national geopark, and a provincial nature reserve. The area features karst landforms with caves, gorges, and diverse flora and fauna, and preserves historical sites such as Fan Kuai's garrison and ancient plank roads.

Batai Mountain, located in the eastern part of Batai Township, Wanyuan City, Dazhou, Sichuan Province, is named for its multi-tiered stepped landform. It is designated as a national 4A-level tourist attraction, a national geopark, and a national natural heritage site. The main peak, Xinbatai, has an elevation of 2,272.3 meters, with other peaks including Laobatai, Duxiu, and Zhujian.

Wufeng Mountain National Forest Park, also known as the "Bamboo Sea Park," is located in the eastern part of Dazhu County, Dazhou City, Sichuan Province. Covering an area of 876 hectares with an elevation ranging from 600 to 1,080 meters, it has a subtropical humid climate. Approved by the State Forestry Administration in 2002, it has since been designated as a national 3A- and 4A-level tourist attraction, a provincial-level tourist resort, and an ecological tourism demonstration area.

Dazhou Museum is located at 4 Yongxing Road, Tongchuan District, Dazhou, Sichuan Province, covering an area of 5,700 square meters with a total building area of 9,261 square meters. The museum was established in 2006 and opened to the public in 2011. It houses approximately 11,000 cultural relics, of which 3,586 are on display, including national first- to third-class relics.

Longtan River is located in Wanyuan, Dazhou, Sichuan. The rafting course is about 10 kilometers long, divided into rapid, gentle, and family-friendly sections, with the rafting season running from May to October. Along the route lies the karst cave "Yuquan Cave," noted for its underground river and stalactite formations. A 5-kilometer riverside trail connects waterfalls, ancient trees, and other scenic spots.

=== Points of interest ===
Until 2016 a highrise building with 26 floors at 31°11'28"N 107°30'43"E had a 20-metre-tall electricity pylon on its roof. In 2016 the line including the pylon was dismantled.

== Transportation ==
- China National Highway 210
- Xiangyu Railway (Xiangyang, Hubei−Chongqing)
- Dazhou–Chengdu railway
- A branch line from Dacheng to Wanzhou, Chongqing where it connects with the Yiwan Railway
- Dazhou Jinya Airport, a new airport opened in May 2022
