= List of airports by IATA code: D =

The DST column shows the months in which Daylight Saving Time, a.k.a. Summer Time, begins and ends. A blank DST box usually indicates that the location stays on Standard Time all year, although in some cases the location stays on Summer Time all year. If a location is currently on DST, add one hour to the time in the Time column.

IATA	ICAO	Airport name	Location served	Time	DST
-DA-
DAA	KDAA	Davison Army Airfield	Fort Belvoir, Virginia, United States	UTC−05:00	Mar-Nov
DAB	KDAB	Daytona Beach International Airport	Daytona Beach, Florida, United States	UTC−05:00	Mar-Nov
DAC	VGHS	Shahjalal International Airport	Dhaka, Bangladesh	UTC+06:00	
DAD	VVDN	Da Nang International Airport	Da Nang, Vietnam	UTC+07:00	
DAF		Daup Airport	Daup, Papua New Guinea	UTC+10:00	
DAG	KDAG	Barstow-Daggett Airport	Daggett, California, United States	UTC−08:00	Mar-Nov
DAH		Dathina Airport	Dathina, Yemen	UTC+03:00	
DAK	HEDK	Dakhla Oasis Airport	Dakhla Oasis, Egypt	UTC+02:00	
DAL	KDAL	Dallas Love Field	Dallas, Texas, United States	UTC−06:00	Mar-Nov
DAM	OSDI	Damascus International Airport	Damascus, Syria	UTC+02:00	Mar-Oct
DAN	KDAN	Danville Regional Airport	Danville, Virginia, United States	UTC−05:00	Mar-Nov
DAO		Dabo Airport	Dabo, Papua New Guinea	UTC+10:00	
DAP	VNDL	Darchula Airport	Darchula, Nepal	UTC+05:45	
DAR	HTDA	Julius Nyerere International Airport	Dar es Salaam, Tanzania	UTC+03:00	
DAS		Great Bear Lake Airport (TC: CFF4)	Great Bear Lake, Northwest Territories, Canada	UTC−08:00	Mar-Nov
DAT	ZBDT	Datong Yungang Airport	Datong, Shanxi, China	UTC+08:00	
DAU	AYDU	Daru Airport	Daru, Papua New Guinea	UTC+10:00	
DAV	MPDA	Enrique Malek International Airport	David, Panama	UTC−05:00	
DAX	ZUDX	Dazhou Heshi Airport	Dazhou, Sichuan, China	UTC+08:00	
DAY	KDAY	Dayton International Airport	Dayton, Ohio, United States	UTC−05:00	Mar-Nov
DAZ	OADZ	Darwaz Airport	Darwaz, Afghanistan	UTC+04:30	
-DB-
DBA	OPDB	Dalbandin Airport	Dalbandin, Pakistan	UTC+05:00	
DBB	HEAL	Al Alamain International Airport	El Alamein, Egypt	UTC+02:00	
DBC	ZYBA	Baicheng Chang'an Airport	Baicheng, Jilin, China	UTC+08:00	
DBD	VEDB	Dhanbad Airport	Dhanbad, Jharkhand, India	UTC+05:30	
DBK		Dutch Bay Seaplane Base	Kalpitiya, Sri Lanka	UTC+05:30	
DBM	HADM	Debre Marqos Airport	Debre Marqos, Ethiopia	UTC+03:00	
DBN	KDBN	W. H. 'Bud' Barron Airport	Dublin, Georgia, United States	UTC−05:00	Mar-Nov
DBO	YSDU	Dubbo Regional Airport	Dubbo, New South Wales, Australia	UTC+10:00	Oct-Apr
DBP	AYDB	Debepare Airport	Debepare, Papua New Guinea	UTC+10:00	
DBQ	KDBQ	Dubuque Regional Airport	Dubuque, Iowa, United States	UTC−06:00	Mar-Nov
DBR	VE89	Darbhanga Airport	Darbhanga, Bihar, India	UTC+05:30	
DBS		Dubois Municipal Airport (FAA: U41)	Dubois, Idaho, United States	UTC−07:00	Mar-Nov
DBT	HADT	Debre Tabor Airport	Debre Tabor, Ethiopia	UTC+03:00	
DBU		Dambulu Oya Tank Seaplane Base	Dambulla, Sri Lanka	UTC+05:30	
DBV	LDDU	Dubrovnik Airport	Dubrovnik, Croatia	UTC+01:00	Mar-Oct
DBY	YDAY	Dalby Airport	Dalby, Queensland, Australia	UTC+10:00	
-DC-
DCA	KDCA	Ronald Reagan Washington National Airport	Arlington County (near Washington, D.C.), Virginia, United States	UTC−05:00	Mar-Nov
DCF	TDCF	Canefield Airport	Canefield, Dominica	UTC−04:00	
DCG		Dubai Creek Seaplane Base	Dubai, United Arab Emirates	UTC+04:00	
DCI	LIED	Decimomannu Air Base	Decimomannu, Sardinia, Italy	UTC+01:00	Mar-Oct
DCK		Dahl Creek Airport	Dahl Creek, Alaska, United States	UTC−09:00	Mar-Nov
DCM	LFCK	Castres–Mazamet Airport	Castres, Midi-Pyrénées, France	UTC+01:00	Mar-Oct
DCN	YCIN	RAAF Base Curtin	Derby, Western Australia, Australia	UTC+08:00	
DCT	MYRD	Duncan Town Airport	Duncan Town, Ragged Island, Bahamas	UTC−05:00	Mar-Nov
DCU	KDCU	Pryor Field Regional Airport	Decatur, Alabama, United States	UTC−06:00	Mar-Nov
DCY	ZUDC	Daocheng Yading Airport	Daocheng, Sichuan, China	UTC+08:00	
-DD-
DDC	KDDC	Dodge City Regional Airport	Dodge City, Kansas, United States	UTC−06:00	Mar-Nov
DDD	VRMU	Dhaalu Airport	Dhaalu Atoll, Maldives	UTC+05:00	
DDG	ZYDD	Dandong Langtou Airport	Dandong, Liaoning, China	UTC+08:00	
DDM		Dodoima Airport	Dodoima, Papua New Guinea	UTC+10:00	
DDN	YDLT	Delta Downs Airport	Delta Downs, Queensland, Australia	UTC+10:00	
DDR	ZUDR	Shigatse Tingri Airport	Shigatse, Tibet, China	UTC+08:00	
DDU	OPDD	Dadu Airport	Dadu, Pakistan	UTC+05:00	
-DE-
DEA	OPDG	Dera Ghazi Khan International Airport	Dera Ghazi Khan, Pakistan	UTC+05:00	
DEB	LHDC	Debrecen International Airport	Debrecen, Hungary	UTC+01:00	Mar-Oct
DEC	KDEC	Decatur Airport	Decatur, Illinois, United States	UTC−06:00	Mar-Nov
DED	VIDN	Jolly Grant Airport	Dehradun, Uttarakhand, India	UTC+05:30	
DEE	UHSM	Yuzhno-Kurilsk Mendeleyevo Airport	Yuzhno-Kurilsk, Sakhalin Oblast, Russia	UTC+11:00	
DEF	OIAD	Dezful Airport	Dezful, Iran	UTC+03:30	Mar-Sep
DEH	KDEH	Decorah Municipal Airport	Decorah, Iowa, United States	UTC−06:00	Mar-Nov
DEI	FSSD	Denis Island Airport	Denis Island, Seychelles	UTC+04:00	
DEL	VIDP	Indira Gandhi International Airport	Delhi, India	UTC+05:30	
DEM	HADD	Dembidolo Airport	Dembidolo, Ethiopia	UTC+03:00	
DEN	KDEN	Denver International Airport	Denver, Colorado, United States	UTC−07:00	Mar-Nov
DEP	VEDZ	Daporijo Airport	Daporijo, Arunachal Pradesh, India	UTC+05:30	
DEQ		Deqing Moganshan Airport	Deqing, Zhejiang, China	UTC+08:00	
DER	AYDE	Derim Airport	Derim, Papua New Guinea	UTC+10:00	
DES	FSDR	Desroches Airport	Desroches Island, Seychelles	UTC+04:00	
DET	KDET	Coleman A. Young International Airport	Detroit, Michigan, United States	UTC−05:00	Mar-Nov
DEX		Nop Goliat Dekai Airport	Yahukimo, Indonesia	UTC+09:00	
DEZ	OSDZ	Deir ez-Zor Airport	Deir ez-Zor, Syria	UTC+02:00	Mar-Oct
-DF-
DFI	KDFI	Defiance Memorial Airport	Defiance, Ohio, United States	UTC−05:00	Mar-Nov
DFP		Drumduff Airport	Drumduff, Queensland, Australia	UTC+10:00	
DFW	KDFW	Dallas/Fort Worth International Airport	Dallas / Fort Worth, Texas, United States	UTC−06:00	Mar-Nov
-DG-
DGA	MZPB	Dangriga Airport	Dangriga, Belize	UTC−06:00	
DGC		Degeh Bur Airport	Degeh Bur, Ethiopia	UTC+03:00	
DGD	YDGA	Dalgaranga Airport	Dalgaranga Gold Mine, Western Australia, Australia	UTC+08:00	
DGE	YMDG	Mudgee Airport	Mudgee, New South Wales, Australia	UTC+10:00	Oct-Apr
DGF		Douglas Lake Airport	Douglas Lake, British Columbia, Canada	UTC−08:00	Mar-Nov
DGH	VEDO	Deoghar Airport	Deoghar, Jharkhand, India	UTC+05:30	
DGK		Dugong Beach Lodge Airstrip	Dugong Beach Lodge, Mozambique	UTC+02:00	
DGL	KDGL	Douglas Municipal Airport	Douglas, Arizona, United States	UTC−07:00	
DGM		Dandugama Seaplane Base	Colombo, Sri Lanka	UTC+05:30	
DGN	KNDY	Naval Surface Warfare Center Dahlgren Division (FAA: NDY)	Dahlgren, Virginia, United States	UTC−05:00	Mar-Nov
DGO	MMDO	General Guadalupe Victoria International Airport	Durango, Durango, Mexico	UTC−06:00	Apr-Oct
DGP	EVDA	Daugavpils International Airport	Daugavpils, Latvia	UTC+02:00	Mar-Oct
DGR	NZDA	Dargaville Aerodrome	Dargaville, New Zealand	UTC+12:00	Sep-Apr
DGT	RPVD	Sibulan Airport (Dumaguete Airport)	Dumaguete, Philippines	UTC+08:00	
DGU	DFOD	Dédougou Airport	Dédougou, Burkina Faso	UTC±00:00	
DGW	KDGW	Converse County Airport	Douglas, Wyoming, United States	UTC−07:00	Mar-Nov
-DH-
DHA	OEDR	King Abdulaziz Air Base	Dhahran, Saudi Arabia	UTC+03:00	
DHB		Deer Harbor Sea Plane Base	Deer Harbor, Washington, United States	UTC−08:00	Mar-Nov
DHD	YDRH	Durham Downs Airport	Durham Downs, Queensland, Australia	UTC+10:00	
DHF	OMAM	Al Dhafra Air Base	Abu Dhabi, United Arab Emirates	UTC+04:00	
DHH	ZWLK	Barkol Dahe Airport	Barkol, Xinjiang, China	UTC+08:00	
DHI	VNDH	Dhangadhi Airport	Dhangadhi, Nepal	UTC+05:45	
DHL	ODAL	Dhala Airport	Dhala, Yemen	UTC+03:00	
DHM	VIGG	Gaggal Airport	Kangra, Himachal Pradesh, India	UTC+05:30	
DHN	KDHN	Dothan Regional Airport	Dothan, Alabama, United States	UTC−06:00	Mar-Nov
DHR	EHKD	De Kooy Airfield	Den Helder, Netherlands	UTC+01:00	Mar-Oct
DHT	KDHT	Dalhart Municipal Airport	Dalhart, Texas, United States	UTC−06:00	Mar-Nov
-DI-
DIA	OTBD	Doha International Airport	Doha, Qatar	UTC+03:00	
DIB	VEMN	Dibrugarh Airport (Mohanbari Airport)	Dibrugarh, Assam, India	UTC+05:30	
DIE	FMNA	Arrachart Airport	Antsiranana, Madagascar	UTC+03:00	
DIG	ZPDQ	Diqing Shangri-La Airport	Shangri-La, Yunnan, China	UTC+08:00	
DIJ	LFSD	Dijon Air Base	Dijon, Burgundy, France	UTC+01:00	Mar-Oct
DIK	KDIK	Dickinson Theodore Roosevelt Regional Airport	Dickinson, North Dakota, United States	UTC−07:00	Mar-Nov
DIL	WPDL	Presidente Nicolau Lobato International Airport	Dili, East Timor	UTC+09:00	
DIM	DIDK	Dimbokro Airport	Dimbokro, Ivory Coast	UTC±00:00	
DIN	VVDB	Dien Bien Phu Airport	Dien Bien Phu, Vietnam	UTC+07:00	
DIO	PPDM	Diomede Heliport	Diomede, Alaska, United States	UTC−09:00	Mar-Nov
DIP	DFED	Diapaga Airport	Diapaga, Burkina Faso	UTC±00:00	
DIQ	SNDV	Divinópolis Airport (Brigadeiro Cabral Airport)	Divinópolis, Minas Gerais, Brazil	UTC−03:00	
DIR	HADR	Aba Tenna Dejazmach Yilma International Airport	Dire Dawa, Ethiopia	UTC+03:00	
DIS	FCPL	Dolisie Airport	Dolisie, Republic of the Congo	UTC+01:00	
DIU		Diu Airport	Diu, Daman and Diu, India	UTC+05:30	
DIV	DIDV	Divo Airport	Divo, Ivory Coast	UTC±00:00	
DIW		Mawella Lagoon Seaplane Base	Dickwella, Sri Lanka	UTC+05:30	
DIY	LTCC	Diyarbakır Airport	Diyarbakır, Turkey	UTC+03:00	
-DJ-
DJA	DBBD	Djougou Airport	Djougou, Benin	UTC+01:00	
DJB	WIPA	Sultan Thaha Airport	Jambi, Indonesia	UTC+07:00	
DJE	DTTJ	Djerba–Zarzis International Airport	Djerba, Tunisia	UTC+01:00	
DJG	DAAJ	Tiska Djanet Airport	Djanet, Algeria	UTC+01:00	
DJH		Jebel Ali Seaplane Base	Dubai, United Arab Emirates	UTC+04:00	
DJJ	WAJJ	Sentani Airport	Jayapura, Indonesia	UTC+09:00	
DJM	FCBD	Djambala Airport	Djambala, Republic of the Congo	UTC+01:00	
DJN		Delta Junction Airport (FAA: D66)	Delta Junction, Alaska, United States	UTC−09:00	Mar-Nov
DJO	DIDL	Daloa Airport	Daloa, Ivory Coast	UTC±00:00	
DJU	BIDV	Djúpivogur Airport	Djúpivogur, Iceland	UTC±00:00	
-DK-
DKA		Katsina Airport	Katsina, Nigeria	UTC+01:00	
DKI	YDKI	Dunk Island Airport	Dunk Island, Queensland, Australia	UTC+10:00	
DKK	KDKK	Chautauqua County/Dunkirk Airport	Dunkirk, New York, United States	UTC−05:00	Mar-Nov
DKR	GOOY	Léopold Sédar Senghor International Airport	Dakar, Senegal	UTC±00:00	
DKS	UODD	Dikson Airport	Dikson, Krasnoyarsk Krai, Russia	UTC+07:00	
DKV	YDVR	Docker River Airport	Docker River, Northern Territory, Australia	UTC+09:30	
-DL-
DLA	FKKD	Douala International Airport	Douala, Cameroon	UTC+01:00	
DLB		Dalbertis Airport	Dalbertis, Papua New Guinea	UTC+10:00	
DLC	ZYTL	Dalian Zhoushuizi International Airport	Dalian, Liaoning, China	UTC+08:00	
DLE	LFGJ	Dole–Jura Airport	Dole, Franche-Comté, France	UTC+01:00	Mar-Oct
DLF	KDLF	Laughlin Air Force Base	Del Rio, Texas, United States	UTC−06:00	Mar-Nov
DLG	PADL	Dillingham Airport	Dillingham, Alaska, United States	UTC−09:00	Mar-Nov
DLH	KDLH	Duluth International Airport	Duluth, Minnesota, United States	UTC−06:00	Mar-Nov
DLI	VVDL	Lien Khuong Airport	Da Lat, Vietnam	UTC+07:00	
DLK	YDLK	Dulkaninna Airport	Dulkaninna, South Australia, Australia	UTC+09:30	Oct-Apr
DLL	KDLC	Dillon County Airport (FAA: DLC)	Dillon, South Carolina, United States	UTC−05:00	Mar-Nov
DLM	LTBS	Dalaman Airport	Dalaman, Turkey	UTC+03:00	
DLN	KDLN	Dillon Airport	Dillon, Montana, United States	UTC−07:00	Mar-Nov
DLS	KDLS	Columbia Gorge Regional Airport (The Dalles Municipal Airport)	The Dalles, Oregon, United States	UTC−08:00	Mar-Nov
DLU	ZPDL	Dali Airport	Dali, Yunnan, China	UTC+08:00	
DLV	YDLV	Delissaville Airport	Delissaville, Northern Territory, Australia	UTC+09:30	
DLY	NVVD	Dillon's Bay Airport	Dillon's Bay, Erromango, Tafea, Vanuatu	UTC+11:00	
DLZ	ZMDZ	Dalanzadgad Airport	Dalanzadgad, Mongolia	UTC+08:00	
-DM-
DMA	KDMA	Davis–Monthan Air Force Base	Tucson, Arizona, United States	UTC−07:00	
DMB	UADD	Taraz Airport (Jambyl Airport)	Taraz, Kazakhstan	UTC+06:00	
DMD	YDMG	Doomadgee Airport	Doomadgee, Queensland, Australia	UTC+10:00	
DME	UUDD	Domodedovo International Airport	Moscow, Russia	UTC+03:00	
DMK	VTBD	Don Mueang International Airport	Bangkok, Thailand	UTC+07:00	
DMM	OEDF	King Fahd International Airport	Dammam, Saudi Arabia	UTC+03:00	
DMN	KDMN	Deming Municipal Airport	Deming, New Mexico, United States	UTC−07:00	Mar-Nov
DMO	KDMO	Sedalia Regional Airport	Sedalia, Missouri, United States	UTC−06:00	Mar-Nov
DMR		Dhamar Airport	Dhamar, Yemen	UTC+03:00	
DMT	SWDM	Diamantino Airport	Diamantino, Mato Grosso, Brazil	UTC−04:00	
DMU	VEMR	Dimapur Airport	Dimapur, Nagaland, India	UTC+05:30	
-DN-
DNA	RODN	Kadena Air Base	Kadena, Okinawa, Japan	UTC+09:00	
DNB	YDBR	Dunbar Airport	Dunbar, Queensland, Australia	UTC+10:00	
DND	EGPN	Dundee Airport	Dundee, Scotland, United Kingdom	UTC±00:00	Mar-Oct
DNF		Martuba Air Base	Derna, Libya	UTC+02:00	
DNG		Doongan Airport	Doongan, Western Australia, Australia	UTC+08:00	
DNH	ZLDH	Dunhuang Airport	Dunhuang, Gansu, China	UTC+08:00	
DNI	HSWD	Wad Medani Airport	Wad Madani, Sudan	UTC+03:00	
DNK	UKDD	Dnipro International Airport	Dnipro, Ukraine	UTC+02:00	Mar-Oct
DNL	KDNL	Daniel Field	Augusta, Georgia, United States	UTC−05:00	Mar-Nov
DNM		Denham Airport	Denham, Western Australia, Australia	UTC+08:00	
DNN	KDNN	Dalton Municipal Airport	Dalton, Georgia, United States	UTC−05:00	Mar-Nov
DNO	SWDN	Dianópolis Airport	Dianópolis, Tocantins, Brazil	UTC−03:00	
DNP	VNDG	Tribhuvannagar Airport (Dang Airport)	Tribhuwannagar, Nepal	UTC+05:45	
DNQ	YDLQ	Deniliquin Airport	Deniliquin, New South Wales, Australia	UTC+10:00	Oct-Apr
DNR	LFRD	Dinard–Pleurtuit–Saint-Malo Airport	Dinard / Saint-Malo, Brittany, France	UTC+01:00	Mar-Oct
DNS	KDNS	Denison Municipal Airport	Denison, Iowa, United States	UTC−06:00	Mar-Nov
DNU	AYDN	Dinangat Airport	Dinangat, Papua New Guinea	UTC+10:00	
DNV	KDNV	Vermilion Regional Airport	Danville, Illinois, United States	UTC−06:00	Mar-Nov
DNX	HSGG	Galegu Airport	Dinder, Sudan	UTC+03:00	
DNZ	LTAY	Denizli Çardak Airport	Denizli, Turkey	UTC+03:00	
-DO-
DOA		Doany Airport	Doany, Madagascar	UTC+03:00	
DOB	WAPD	Dobo Airport	Dobo, Indonesia	UTC+09:00	
DOC		Dornoch Airfield	Dornoch, Scotland, United Kingdom	UTC±00:00	Mar-Oct
DOD	HTDO	Dodoma Airport	Dodoma, Tanzania	UTC+03:00	
DOE		Djumu Airstrip	Djumu, Suriname	UTC−03:00	
DOG	HSDN	Dongola Airport	Dongola, Sudan	UTC+03:00	
DOH	OTHH	Hamad International Airport	Doha, Qatar	UTC+03:00	
DOI	AYDO	Doini Island Airport	Doini Island, Papua New Guinea	UTC+10:00	
DOK	UKCC	Donetsk International Airport	Donetsk, Ukraine	UTC+03:00	
DOL	LFRG	Deauville – Saint-Gatien Airport	Deauville, Lower Normandy, France	UTC+01:00	Mar-Oct
DOM	TDPD	Douglas–Charles Airport	Saint Andrew Parish, Dominica	UTC−04:00	
DON		Dos Lagunas Airport	Dos Lagunas, Guatemala	UTC−06:00	
DOO	AYDR	Dorobisoro Airstrip	Dorobisoro, Papua New Guinea	UTC+10:00	
DOP	VNDP	Dolpa Airport	Dolpa, Nepal	UTC+05:45	
DOR	DFEE	Dori Airport	Dori, Burkina Faso	UTC±00:00	
DOS		Dios Airport	Dios, Papua New Guinea	UTC+11:00	
DOU	SSDO	Dourados Airport (Francisco de Matos Pereira Airport)	Dourados, Mato Grosso do Sul, Brazil	UTC−04:00	
DOV	KDOV	Dover Air Force Base	Dover, Delaware, United States	UTC−05:00	Mar-Nov
DOX	YDRA	Dongara Airport	Dongara, Western Australia, Australia	UTC+08:00	
DOY	ZSDY	Dongying Shengli Airport	Dongying, Shandong, China	UTC+08:00	
-DP-
DPA	KDPA	DuPage Airport	West Chicago, Illinois, United States	UTC−06:00	Mar-Nov
DPB	SCBI	Pampa Guanaco Airport	Camerón, Timaukel, Tierra del Fuego Province, Magallanes Region, Chile	UTC−04:00	
DPE	LFAB	Dieppe - Saint-Aubin Airport	Dieppe, Upper Normandy, France	UTC+01:00	Mar-Oct
DPG	KDPG	Michael Army Airfield	Dugway, Utah, United States	UTC−07:00	Mar-Nov
DPL	RPMG	Dipolog Airport	Dipolog, Philippines	UTC+08:00	
DPO	YDPO	Devonport Airport	Devonport, Tasmania, Australia	UTC+10:00	Oct-Apr
DPS	WADD	Ngurah Rai International Airport	Denpasar (Bali), Indonesia	UTC+08:00	
DPT		Deputatsky Airport	Deputatsky, Yakutia, Russia	UTC+10:00	
DPU		Dumpu Airport	Dumpu, Papua New Guinea	UTC+10:00	
-DQ-
DQA	ZYDQ	Daqing Sartu Airport	Daqing, Heilongjiang, China	UTC+08:00	
DQM		Duqm International Airport	Duqm, Oman	UTC+04:00	
-DR-
DRA	KDRA	Desert Rock Airport	Mercury, Nevada, United States	UTC−08:00	Mar-Nov
DRB	YDBY	Derby Airport	Derby, Western Australia, Australia	UTC+08:00	
DRC		Dirico Airport	Dirico, Angola	UTC+01:00	
DRD	YDOR	Dorunda Airport	Dorunda, Queensland, Australia	UTC+10:00	
DRE	KDRM	Drummond Island Airport (FAA: DRM)	Drummond Island, Michigan, United States	UTC−05:00	Mar-Nov
DRF		Drift River Airport	Drift River, Alaska, United States	UTC−09:00	Mar-Nov
DRG	PADE	Deering Airport (FAA: DEE)	Deering, Alaska, United States	UTC−09:00	Mar-Nov
DRH		Dabra Airport	Dabra, Indonesia	UTC+09:00	
DRI	KDRI	Beauregard Regional Airport	DeRidder, Louisiana, United States	UTC−06:00	Mar-Nov
DRJ	SMDA	Drietabbetje Airstrip	Drietabbetje, Suriname	UTC−03:00	
DRK	MRDK	Drake Bay Airport	Drake Bay, Costa Rica	UTC−06:00	
DRN	YDBI	Dirranbandi Airport	Dirranbandi, Queensland, Australia	UTC+10:00	
DRO	KDRO	Durango–La Plata County Airport	Durango, Colorado, United States	UTC−07:00	Mar-Nov
DRP	RPLK	Bicol International Airport	Daraga, Albay, Philippines	UTC+8:00	
DRR	YDRI	Durrie Airport	Durrie, Queensland, Australia	UTC+10:00	
DRS	EDDC	Dresden Airport	Dresden, Saxony, Germany	UTC+01:00	Mar-Oct
DRT	KDRT	Del Rio International Airport	Del Rio, Texas, United States	UTC−06:00	Mar-Nov
DRU		Drummond Airport (FAA: M26)	Drummond, Montana, United States	UTC−07:00	Mar-Nov
DRV	VRMD	Dharavandhoo Airport	Dharavandhoo Island, Baa Atoll, Maldives	UTC+05:00	
DRW	YPDN	Darwin International Airport	Darwin, Northern Territory, Australia	UTC+09:30	
DRY	YDRD	Drysdale River Airport	Drysdale River, Western Australia, Australia	UTC+08:00	
-DS-
DSA	EGCN	Doncaster Sheffield Airport	Doncaster, England, United Kingdom	UTC±00:00	Mar-Oct
DSC	FKKS	Dschang Airport	Dschang, Cameroon	UTC+01:00	
DSD	TFFA	La Désirade Airport (Grande-Anse Airport)	La Désirade, Guadeloupe	UTC−04:00	
DSE	HADC	Combolcha Airport	Dessie / Kombolcha, Ethiopia	UTC+03:00	
DSG		Dilasag Airport	Dilasag, Philippines	UTC+08:00	
DSI	KDTS	Destin Executive Airport (FAA: DTS)	Destin, Florida, United States	UTC−06:00	Mar-Nov
DSK	OPDI	Dera Ismail Khan Airport	Dera Ismail Khan, Pakistan	UTC+05:00	
DSM	KDSM	Des Moines International Airport	Des Moines, Iowa, United States	UTC−06:00	Mar-Nov
DSN	ZBDS	Ordos Ejin Horo Airport	Ordos, Inner Mongolia, China	UTC+08:00	
DSO	ZKSD	Sondok Airport	Sondok, North Korea	UTC+08:30	
DSS	GOBD	Blaise Diagne International Airport	Dakar, Senegal	UTC±00:00	
DSV	KDSV	Dansville Municipal Airport	Dansville, New York, United States	UTC−05:00	Mar-Nov
DSX	RCLM	Dongsha Island Airport	Pratas (Tungsha/Dongsha) Island, Taiwan	UTC+08:00	
DSY	VDDS	Dara Sakor International Airport	Botum Sakor, Koh Kong, Cambodia	UTC+07:00	
-DT-
DTA	KDTA	Delta Municipal Airport	Delta, Utah, United States	UTC−07:00	Mar-Nov
DTB	WIMN	Silangit Airport	Siborong-Borong, Indonesia	UTC+07:00	
DTD	WALJ	Datadawai Airport	Datadawai, Indonesia	UTC+08:00	
DTE	RPUD	Bagasbas Airport	Daet, Philippines	UTC+08:00	
DTH		Furnace Creek Airport (FAA: L06)	Death Valley, California, United States	UTC−08:00	Mar-Nov
DTI	SNDT	Diamantina Airport	Diamantina, Minas Gerais, Brazil	UTC−03:00	
DTL	KDTL	Detroit Lakes Airport (Wething Field)	Detroit Lakes, Minnesota, United States	UTC−06:00	Mar-Nov
DTM	EDLW	Dortmund Airport	Dortmund, North Rhine-Westphalia, Germany	UTC+01:00	Mar-Oct
DTN	KDTN	Shreveport Downtown Airport	Shreveport, Louisiana, United States	UTC−06:00	Mar-Nov
DTR		Decatur Shores Airport	Decatur Island, Washington, United States	UTC−08:00	Mar-Nov
DTT		metropolitan area^{1}	Detroit, Michigan, United States	UTC−05:00	Mar-Nov
DTU		Wudalianchi Airport	Wudalianchi, Heilongjiang, China	UTC+08:00	
DTW	KDTW	Detroit Metropolitan Wayne County Airport	Detroit, Michigan, United States	UTC−05:00	Mar-Nov
DTX	KTKI	McKinney National Airport	McKinney, Texas, United States	UTC−06:00	Mar-Nov
-DU-
DUA	KDUA	Durant Regional Airport–Eaker Field	Durant, Oklahoma, United States	UTC−06:00	Mar-Nov
DUB	EIDW	Dublin Airport	Dublin, Ireland	UTC±00:00	Mar-Oct
DUC	KDUC	Halliburton Field	Duncan, Oklahoma, United States	UTC−06:00	Mar-Nov
DUD	NZDN	Dunedin International Airport	Dunedin, New Zealand	UTC+12:00	Sep-Apr
DUE	FNDU	Dundo Airport	Dundo, Angola	UTC+01:00	
DUF		Pine Island Airport (FAA: 7NC2)	Corolla, North Carolina, United States	UTC−05:00	Mar-Nov
DUG	KDUG	Bisbee Douglas International Airport	Bisbee / Douglas, Arizona, United States	UTC−07:00	
DUJ	KDUJ	DuBois Regional Airport	DuBois, Pennsylvania, United States	UTC−05:00	Mar-Nov
DUK	FADK	Dukuduku Airport	Mtubatuba, South Africa	UTC+02:00	
DUM	WIBD	Pinang Kampai Airport	Dumai, Indonesia	UTC+07:00	
DUQ		Duncan Airport	Duncan, British Columbia, Canada	UTC−08:00	Mar-Nov
DUR	FALE	King Shaka International Airport	Durban, South Africa	UTC+02:00	
DUS	EDDL	Düsseldorf Airport	Düsseldorf, North Rhine-Westphalia, Germany	UTC+01:00	Mar-Oct
DUT	PADU	Unalaska Airport	Unalaska, Alaska, United States	UTC−09:00	Mar-Nov
-DV-
DVD		Andavadoaka Airport	Andavadoaka, Madagascar	UTC+03:00	
DVK		Diavik Airport	Diavik Diamond Mine, Northwest Territories, Canada	UTC−07:00	Mar-Nov
DVL	KDVL	Devils Lake Regional Airport (Devils Lake Municipal Airport)	Devils Lake, North Dakota, United States	UTC−06:00	Mar-Nov
DVN	KDVN	Davenport Municipal Airport	Davenport, Iowa, United States	UTC−06:00	Mar-Nov
DVO	RPMD	Francisco Bangoy International Airport	Davao City, Philippines	UTC+08:00	
DVP	YDPD	Davenport Downs Airport	Davenport Downs, Queensland, Australia	UTC+10:00	
DVR		Daly River Airport	Daly River, Northern Territory, Australia	UTC+09:30	
DVT	KDVT	Phoenix Deer Valley Airport	Phoenix, Arizona, United States	UTC−07:00	
-DW-
DWA	FWDW	Dwanga Airport (Dwangwa Airport)	Dwangwa, Malawi	UTC+02:00	
DWB	FMNO	Soalala Airport	Soalala, Madagascar	UTC+03:00	
DWC	OMDW	Al Maktoum International Airport	Dubai, United Arab Emirates	UTC+04:00	
DWD	OEDW	Dawadmi Domestic Airport (King Salman bin Abdul Aziz Domestic Airport)	Dawadmi, Saudi Arabia	UTC+03:00	
DWH	KDWH	David Wayne Hooks Memorial Airport	Houston, Texas, United States	UTC−06:00	Mar-Nov
DWO		Diyawanna Oya Seaplane Base	Sri Jayawardenepura Kotte, Sri Lanka	UTC+05:30	
DWR	OADY	Dwyer Airport	Camp Dwyer, Afghanistan	UTC+04:30	
-DX-
DXB	OMDB	Dubai International Airport	Dubai, United Arab Emirates	UTC+04:00	
DXD	YDIX	Dixie Airport	Dixie, Queensland, Australia	UTC+10:00	
DXE	KMBO	Bruce Campbell Field (FAA: MBO)	Madison, Mississippi, United States	UTC−06:00	Mar-Nov
DXN	VIND	Noida International Airport	Jewar, India	UTC+05:30	
DXR	KDXR	Danbury Municipal Airport	Danbury, Connecticut, United States	UTC−05:00	Mar-Nov
-DY-
DYA	YDYS	Dysart Airport	Dysart, Queensland, Australia	UTC+10:00	
DYG	ZGDY	Zhangjiajie Hehua Airport	Zhangjiajie, Hunan, China	UTC+08:00	
DYL	KDYL	Doylestown Airport	Doylestown, Pennsylvania, United States	UTC−05:00	Mar-Nov
DYM		Diamantina Lakes Airport	Diamantina Lakes, Queensland, Australia	UTC+10:00	
DYR	UHMA	Ugolny Airport	Anadyr, Chukotka, Russia	UTC+12:00	
DYS	KDYS	Dyess Air Force Base	Abilene, Texas, United States	UTC−06:00	Mar-Nov
DYU	UTDD	Dushanbe International Airport	Dushanbe, Tajikistan	UTC+05:00	
DYW		Daly Waters Airport	Daly Waters, Northern Territory, Australia	UTC+09:30	
-DZ-
DZA	FMCZ	Dzaoudzi–Pamandzi International Airport	Dzaoudzi, Mayotte	UTC+03:00	
DZH	ZUDA	Dazhou Jinya Airport	Dazhou, Sichuan, China	UTC+08:00	
DZI		Codazzi Airport	Codazzi, Colombia	UTC−05:00	
DZN	UAKD	Zhezkazgan Airport	Zhezkazgan, Kazakhstan	UTC+06:00	
DZO	SUDU	Santa Bernardina International Airport	Durazno, Uruguay	UTC−03:00	
DZU	ZUDZ	Dazu Air Base	Dazu, Chongqing, China	UTC+08:00	

== Notes ==
- ^1 DTT is common IATA code for Detroit Metropolitan Airport (IATA: DTW), Coleman A. Young International Airport (IATA: DET) and Willow Run Airport (IATA: YIP).
