= DEQ =

DEQ may refer to:

- Delivered Ex Quay, an Incoterm
- Department of Environmental Quality, any of various U.S. state agencies:
  - Arkansas Department of Environmental Quality
  - Idaho Department of Environmental Quality
  - Louisiana Department of Environmental Quality
  - Michigan Department of Environmental Quality
  - Montana Department of Environmental Quality
  - Oklahoma Department of Environmental Quality
  - Oregon Department of Environmental Quality
  - Utah Department of Environmental Quality
- J. Lynn Helms Sevier County Airport, De Queen, Arkansas, United States
- Deqing Moganshan Airport, in Zhejiang, China
- Double-ended queue
- Drug Effects Questionnaire, a rating scale
- Deq (tattoo), traditional Kurdish tattoos
- Equatorial diameter, a unit of diameter for celestial bodies

== See also ==
- Dec (disambiguation)
- DEK (disambiguation)
