= Indonesian Army Aviation Center =

Indonesian Army Aviation Branch
- Pusat Penerbangan TNI Angkatan Darat
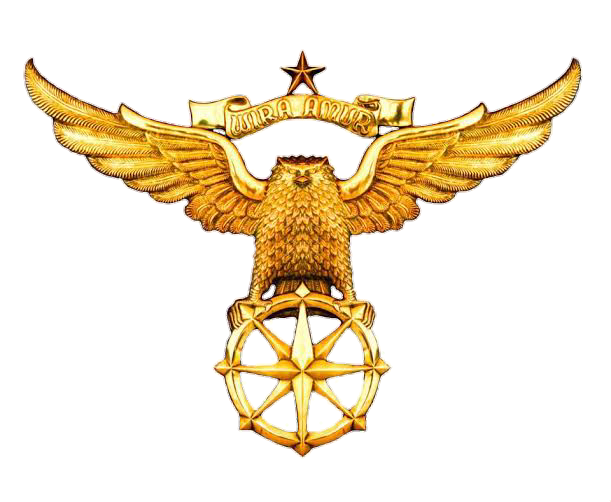
- Indonesian Army Aviation Branch Insignia
- Founded: 14 November 1959
- Country: Indonesia
- Branch: Indonesian Army
- Type: Army Aviation
- Role: Aerial Mobile Maneuver (Mobud); Aerial fire support; Air recon; Air support; Combat support
- Garrison/HQ: Pondok Cabe Airport, South Tangerang, Banten
- Motto(s): "Wira Amur" (Sanskrit) "The flying soldiers"
- Colors: Red Wine
- March: Mars Penerbad

Commanders
- Commanding General: Maj.Gen. Toto Nugroho
- Vice Commander: Brig.Gen. Achdwiyanto Yudi Hartono

Insignia
- Roundel

- Fin flash

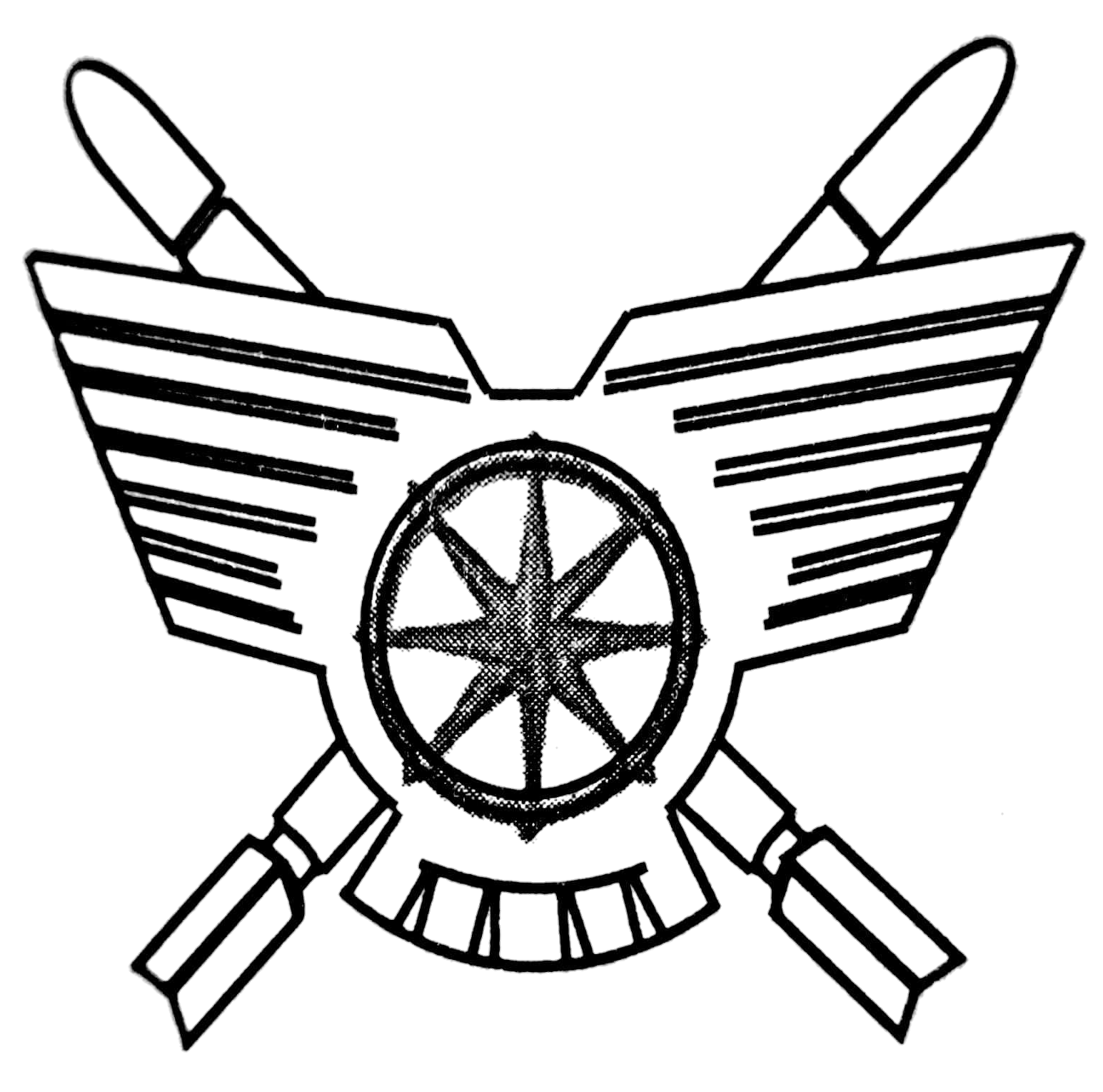
- Corps Sign

Aircraft flown
- Attack helicopter: AH-64E, Mi-35P
- Cargo helicopter: Mi-17V-5
- Multirole helicopter: Bell 205, Bell 412, NBo 105, AS355/AS550
- Transport: NC-212, Beechcraft Premier I

The Indonesian Army Aviation Center (Indonesian: Pusat Penerbangan Angkatan Darat) abbreviated Puspenerbad or simply Penerbad is the Army aviation unit of the Indonesian Army which has a means to support the combat mobility of the troops and also transport Infantrymen for Air assault operations. Penerbad is considered as an integral part mainly in cases of Air assault operations parallel to other Armament Corps of the Indonesian Army. Other additional tasks conducted by the unit can be implemented to support non-combat operations such as Search and rescue, Disaster relief, etc.

== History ==
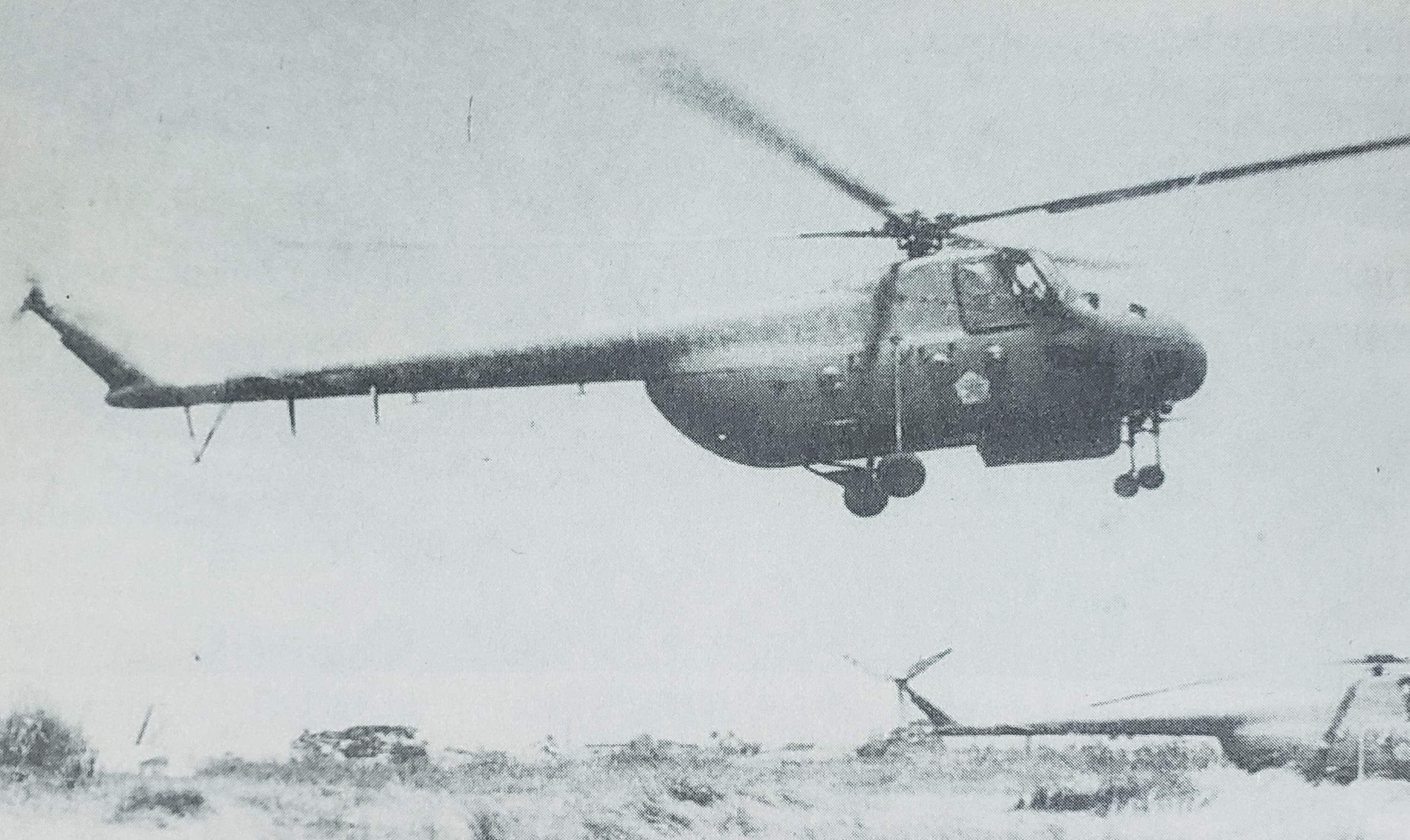
Indonesian Army Mil Mi-4

The Indonesian army aviation was born in 1959 - the beginning of Guided Democracy - when the doctrine of Heliborne Troops or Air Mobile was being developed in various countries. In Sarawak during the period of the Indonesia–Malaysia confrontation the British SAS launched an air assault operation with Westland Wessex helicopter containing 16 personnel. During the Vietnam War, the United States Army operated in the form of Air Cavalry by the 1st Cavalry Division and Sky Soldiers by the 173rd Airborne Brigade using UH-1N Huey, UH-1 Iroquois and CH-47 Chinook helicopters supported by AH-1S attack helicopter Cobra and CH-54 Flying Crane. In Algeria, the French Army conducted a similar operation earlier with the Alouette III. The Soviet Union would only commence its air assault work in 1979 during the Soviet invasion of Afghanistan.

When the Chief of Staff of the Army made a Decree on the establishment of the Army Aviation Detachment (Indonesian: Detasemen Penerbad) on November 14, 1959 with the task of taking care of all activities concerning the field of organic army aviation, at that time Detasemen Penerbad did not have any aircraft at all. At that time the news was heard that Dr. A.K. Gani's DHC-2 Mk I Beaver plane which was being overhauled in Singapore will be sold, then the army immediately bought it. November 14 thus serves as the birthday of Indonesian Army Aviation.

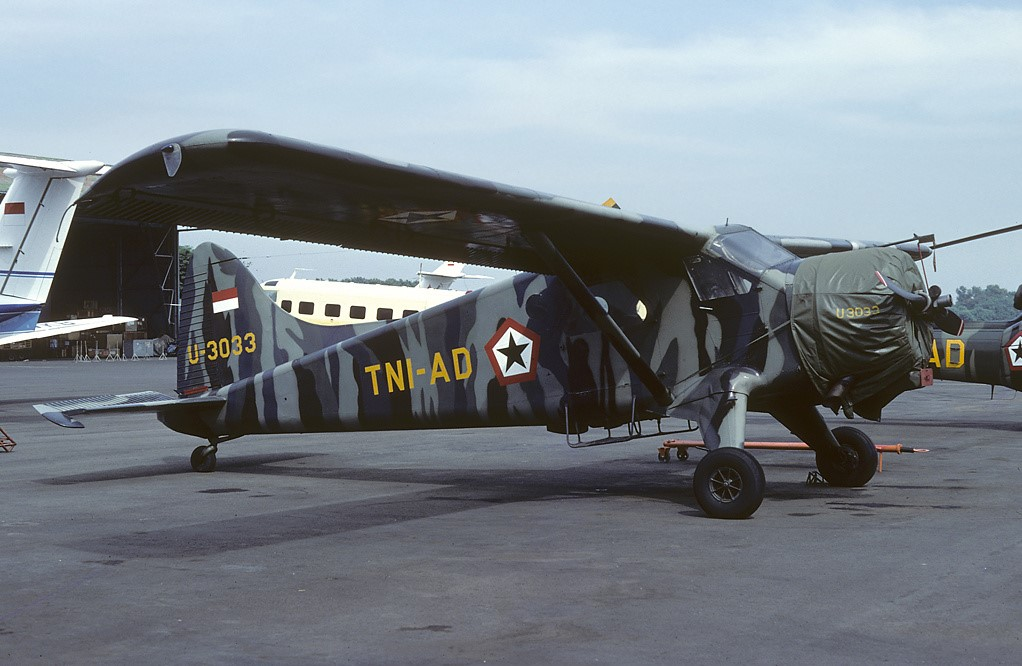
Indonesian Army DHC-2 Beaver at Kemayoran Airport

As a follow-up, some officers including Captain Binjamin Hadi, Captain Burhan Ali and Captain Sukartono were sent to the United States to attend an aviator training at the US Army Aviation School in Fort Rucker, Alabama in 1959 followed by a second batch in 1962 consisting of Lieutenant Colonel Juono, Captain Dolf Latumahina, Captain Sudewo, Captain Daud Natawiyoga, 1st Lt T.M.F. Worang and several other officers. It bore fruit when the Detachment later acquired two Cessna L-19 aircraft in the framework of the US Military Assistant Program in 1964, followed on by 15 Soviet-made Mil Mi-4 medium and 1 Mil Mi-6 heavy multipurpose helicopters, together with 2 American made Aero Commander 680FL utility aircraft in 1965. These purchases made Indonesia one of the pioneer countries in Southeast Asia to have a strong army aviation force, and thus, the Detachment was transformed via Decision Kep/853/VII/1963 of the Chief of Staff of the Army on 22 July 1963 into the Army Aviation Service (Dispenerbad), which adopted its current name on 15 January 1966 (name readopted on 26 May 2000).

In 2022 Army Aviation received its new distinguishing berets of maroon red colour which replaced the green.

== Mission ==
The mission of Indonesian Army Aviation is to find, fix, and destroy the enemy through fire and maneuver; and to provide combat, combat support and combat service support in coordinated operations as an integral member of the combined arms team. On the modern battlefield, Indonesian Army Aviation, unlike the other members of the combined arms team, has the organic flexibility, versatility, and assets to fulfill a variety of maneuver, CS, CSS, roles and functions. These cover the spectrum of combined arms operations. Aviation can accomplish each of these roles—within the limits of finite assets and capabilities—during offensive or defensive operations and also for joint, combined, contingency, or special operations, as well as in civil-military operations such as disaster relief.

As a Central Executive Agency of the Army with greater importance, its Commander and Deputy Commander, filled up by officers of Major General and Brigadier General rank, respectively, are appointed and relieved from their positions by the Chief of Staff of the Army. Training is imparted to all enlistees and graduate officers assigned at the Army Aviation Corps Training school in Semarang, where they receive specialized training in helicopter warfare.

== Squadrons ==
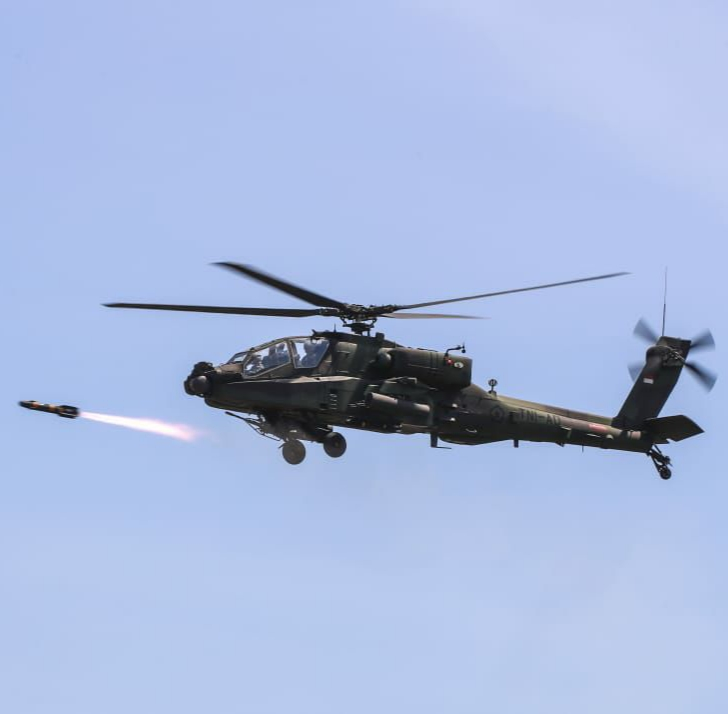
Boeing AH-64E Apache Guardian firing AGM-114R3 Hellfire missile

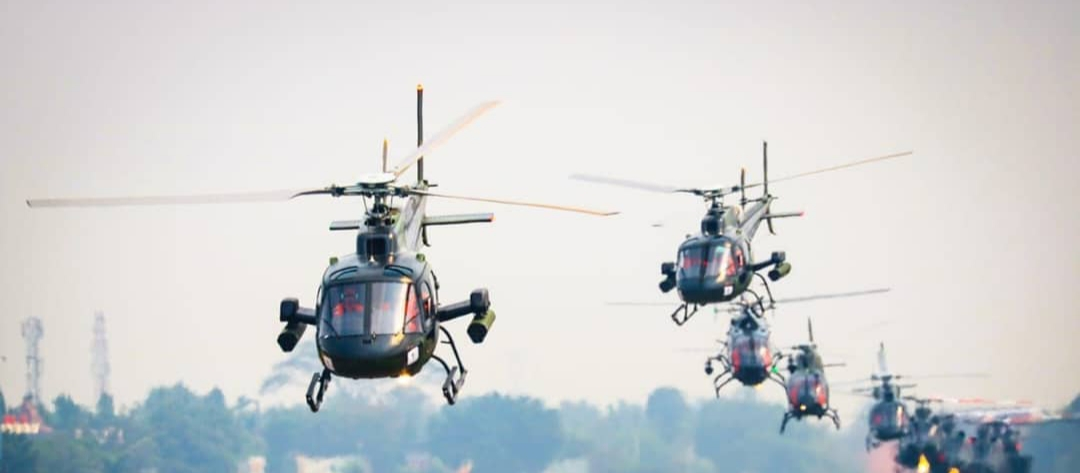
Eurocopter AS555 Fennec

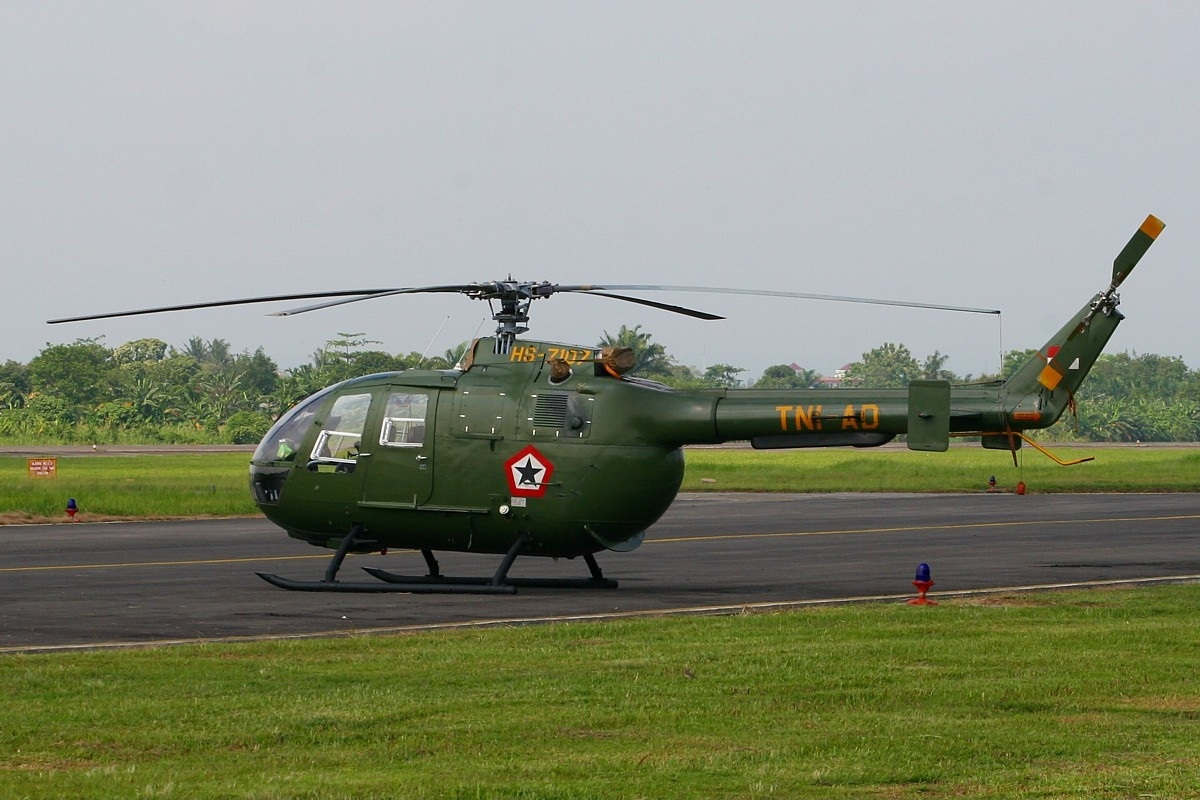
Indonesian Army - MBB (IPTN) NBO-105CB-4

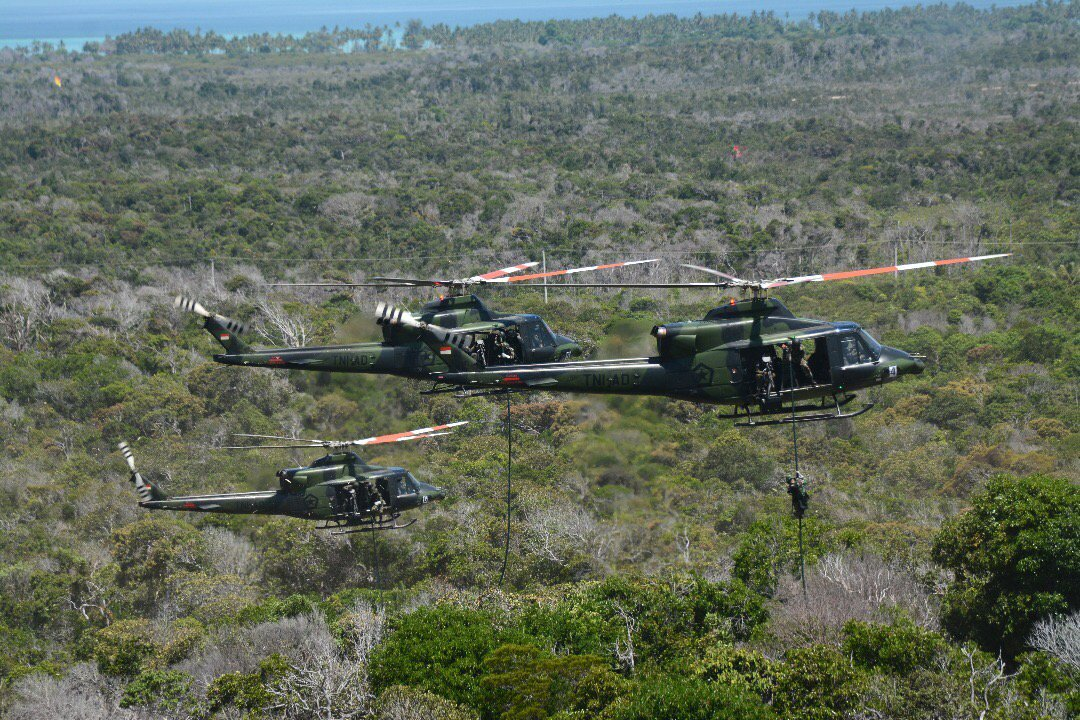
Indonesian Army Aviation helicopters training in Natuna Island, Riau Islands

Puspenerbad currently has five squadrons and one training center, which are:

- 11th Squadron/Assault (Semarang, Central Java)
- 12th Squadron/Assault (Waytuba, Lampung)
- 13th Squadron/Assault (Berau, East Kalimantan)
- 21st Squadron/Multipurpose (Pondok Cabe, South Tangerang, Banten)
- 31st Squadron/Assault (Semarang, Central Java)
- Army Aviation Corps Training school (Pusdik Penerbad) located at Semarang, Central Java

Unit	Headquarters	Aircraft	Insignia	Notes
Assault Squadron
Skadron-11/Serbu Amur Amara Jaya	Pangkalan Udara Utama Angkatan Darat Ahmad Yani (WAHS) Semarang, Central Java	Bell 412; Boeing AH-64E Apache Guardian		
Skadron-12/Serbu Amur Jaya Yudha	Pangkalan Udara Angkatan Darat Gatot Soebroto (WIPO) Way Kanan, Lampung	Bell 412; MBB Bo 105 Bolkow; Airbus AS550C3 Fennec		
Skadron-13/Serbu Amur Balottama Yudha	Pangkalan Udara Kalimarau (WAQT) Berau, East Kalimantan	Bell 412; Airbus AS555AP Fennec 2		
Skadron-31/Serbu Amur Yudha Cakti	Pangkalan Udara Utama Angkatan Darat Ahmad Yani (WAHS) Semarang, Central Java	Mil Mi-17V-5; Mil Mi-35P Hind E		
Multipurpose Squadron
Skadron-21/Sena Akasa Aqraya Yudha	Pangkalan Udara Pondok Cabe (WIHP) South Tangerang, Banten	Bell 412; MBB Bo 105 Bolkow; Beechcraft Premier I; CASA C-212 Aviocar		

== Airbases ==
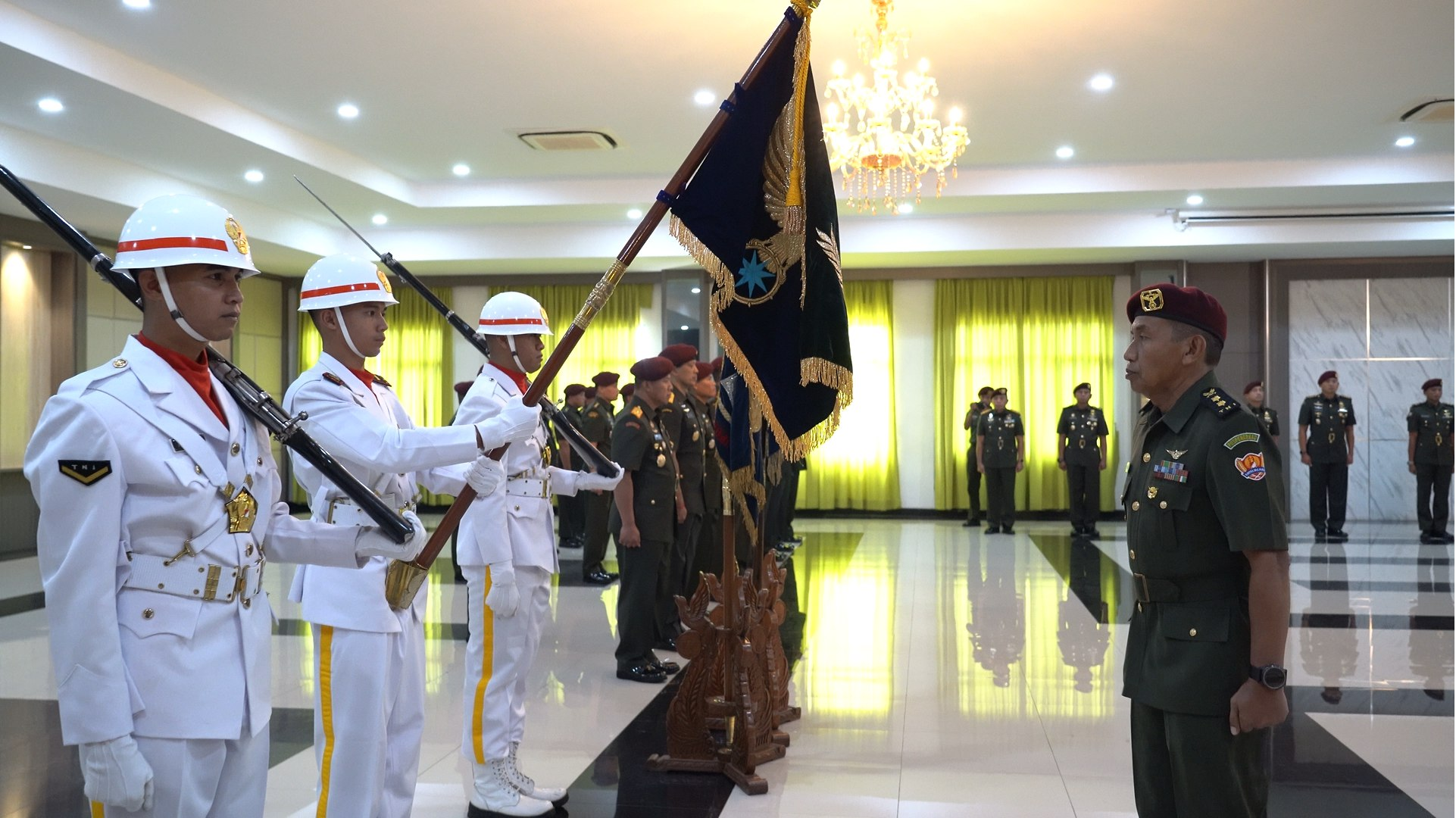
1. Flag of the Army Aviation Center
  Army Airbase Ahmad Yani, at Semarang
2. Army Airbase Pondok Cabe, at South Tangerang
3. Army Airbase Gatot Subroto, at Way Kanan Regency, Lampung

Air Base	Location	Insignia	IATA	ICAO	Unit
Pangkalan Udara Utama Angkatan Darat Ahmad Yani Grha Kriya Akasa	Semarang, Central Java		SRG	WAHS	Pusdik Penerbad; Bengpus Penerbad; Skadron-11/Serbu; Skadron-31/Serbu
Pangkalan Udara Angkatan Darat Gatot Soebroto Wajna Carola	Way Kanan, Lampung		WYK	WIPO	Skadron-12/Serbu
