= Red Church =

Red Church may refer to:

- Red Church (Vourgareli), Tzoumerka, Pindus
- Red Church (Brno) in Brno, Czech Republic
- Red Church (Bulgaria) near Perushtitsa, Bulgaria
- Red Church (Olomouc) in Olomouc, Czech Republic
- Red Church (Güzelyurt), ruined church in Cappadocia, Turkey
- Church of Saints Simon and Helena in Minsk, Belarus
- The former First Methodist Episcopal Church in Port Hope, Michigan
- St. James Episcopal Church in Sonora, California
- The centenary Methodist Church, Baroda
