= DEK =

Dek or DEK may refer to:

- Dek language
- Dek Island, Ethiopia
- Dek (news), subhead
- Dek, a proposed name for digit 10 (↊) in duodecimal
- DEK (gene), a human gene
- Dek, Qazvin, a village in Iran
- German Evangelical Church Confederation (German: Deutscher Evangelischer Kirchenbund; 1922–1933)
- German Evangelical Church in Bohemia, Moravia and Silesia
- Deutsche Einheitskurzschrift, a German stenography system
- Democratic National Party (Cyprus), a Greek Cypriot political party
- Diethyl ketone, a flammable chemical
- Donald Ervin Knuth, an American computer scientist, mathematician, and professor
- Dek (number), the 10th number in the Dozenal number system.
- Dek, a character in Predator: Badlands
