= DRH =

DRH may refer to:

== Places ==
- Dabra Airport (IATA code), Dabra, Indonesia
- Detroit Receiving Hospital, Detroit, Michigan
- Durham Regional Hospital, northern Durham, North Carolina

== People ==
- D. Richard Hipp (b. 1961), primary author of SQLite
- Douglas Richard Hofstadter (b. 1945), American professor of cognitive science
