= Red Church (Olomouc) =

Red Church Červený kostel
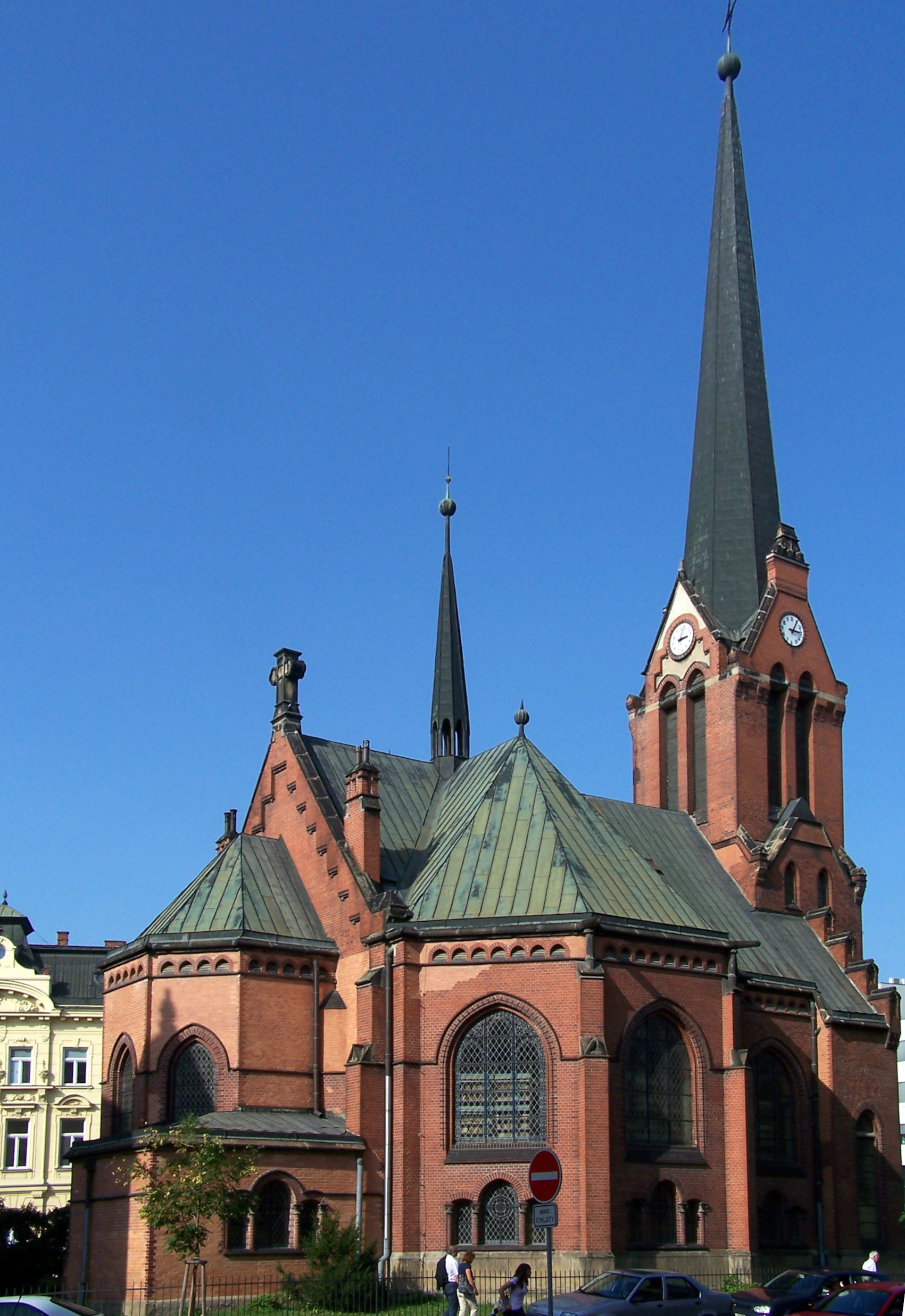
- Red Church

Religion
- Affiliation: Protestant
- Ecclesiastical or organizational status: Former
- Year consecrated: 1902

Location
- Location: Olomouc, Czech Republic
- Interactive map of Red Church; Červený kostel
- Coordinates: 49°35′36.69″N 17°14′50.32″E

Architecture
- Architect: Max Löwe
- Type: Church
- Style: Neo-Gothic
- Completed: 1902

Specifications
- Height (max): 55 m (180 ft)
- Materials: Clay bricks

Red Church (Czech: Červený kostel) is a former Protestant church in Olomouc, Czech Republic.

The church was built in 1901-1902 by German architect Max Löwe. It was used by local German-speaking Protestant congregation of the German Evangelical Church in Bohemia, Moravia and Silesia. After World War II Germans were expelled and the church was shifted to Czech Protestants. In 1959 it was given to the university library, and it now houses the archives of the Research Library.
