= Pelita Air =

Domestic airline of Indonesia

PT Pelita Air Service
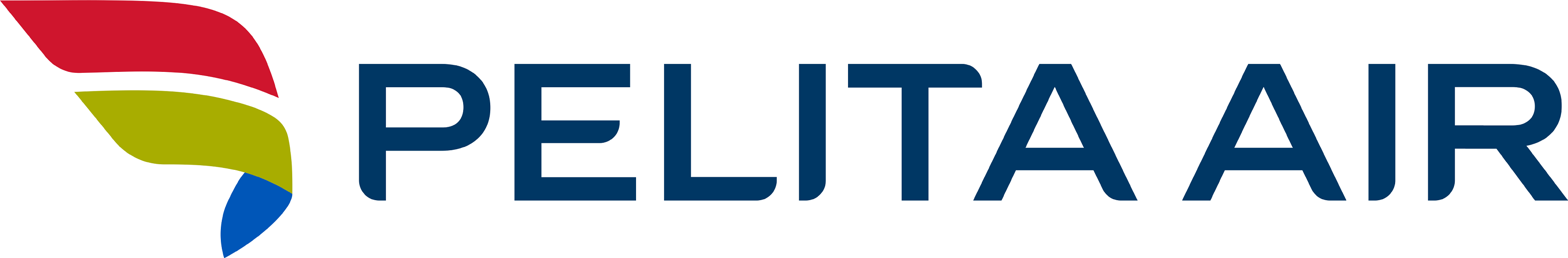

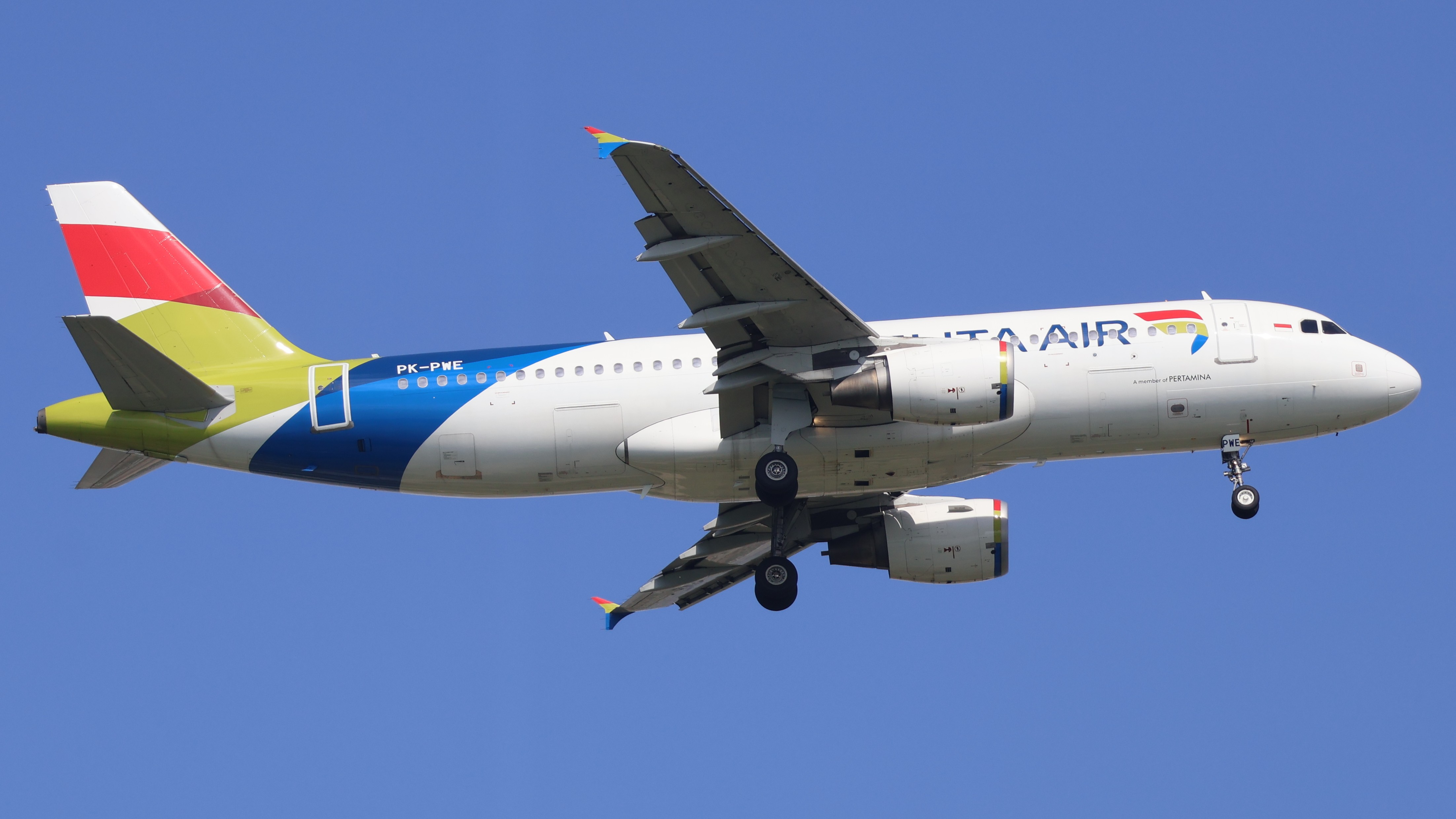
- A Pelita Air Airbus A320-200 in the current livery
IATA	ICAO	Call sign
IP	PAS	PELITA
- Founded: 1963; 63 years ago (as Pertamina Air Service)
- Commenced operations: 28 April 2022; 4 years ago (as Pelita Air Service)
- Hubs: Soekarno–Hatta International Airport
- Fleet size: 21
- Destinations: 15
- Parent company: Pertamina
- Headquarters: Jakarta, Indonesia
- Key people: Dendy Kurniawan (president & CEO)
- Website: www.pelita-air.com

Pelita Air is a scheduled airline based in Jakarta, Indonesia. It is owned by oil and gas company Pertamina, a subsidiary of Indonesia's sovereign wealth fund, Danantara. Its main operating base is Soekarno–Hatta International Airport, and it is headquartered at Pondok Cabe Airport. Pelita Air is listed in category 1 by Indonesian Civil Aviation Authority for airline safety quality.

== History ==
=== Early years (1963–1970) ===
The airline started its history in 1963 when Pertamina established an air transportation service division named Pertamina Air Service to support employee mobility. On 24 January 1970, the division was officially separated into a separate company under the name "PT Pelita Air Service". The company also provides air transportation services for the oil and gas industry in Indonesia on a rental system.

=== New ventures (1987–2020) ===
On 24 November 1987, the company established PT Indopelita Aircraft Services (IAS) to provide maintenance services for rotating components, such as turbines, compressors and pumps, as well as general and field mechanical services. IAS also offers a digital control system to monitor equipment performance.

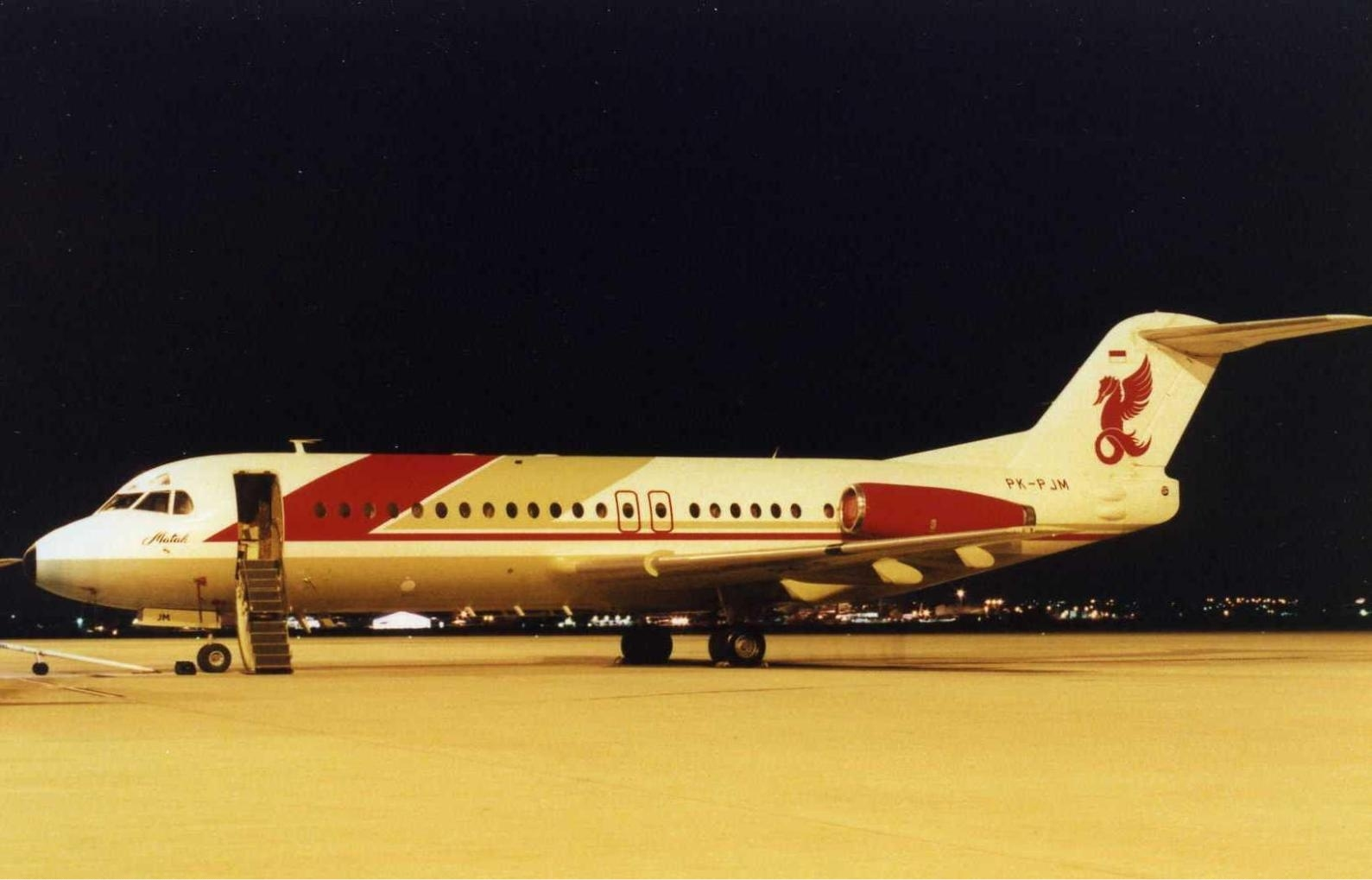
A Pelita Air Fokker F28 Fellowship in the late 1980s

In 2000, the company provided scheduled flight services under the name "Pelita AirVenture". It ceased scheduled flights in 2005, citing tough competition in the scheduled aviation sector. In 2016, the company formed an Airport Strategic Business Unit (SBU) in charge of managing Pertamina's airports. In 2019, SBU Airport started managing three airports owned by Pertamina, namely Pondok Cabe Airport, Pinang Kampai Airport, and Warukin Airport. In 2020, the company started to provide general cargo transportation services.

=== Relaunch as a scheduled airline (2021–present) ===
In late 2021, Indonesian media reported that the Indonesian Ministry of State-owned Enterprises (BUMN) had plans to have Pelita Air replace the financially-ailing flag carrier, Garuda Indonesia, citing the latter's high debt. In November 2021, the ministry's plan for the airline to start scheduled flights was followed by an aircraft lease order for several Airbus A320 aircraft, during which time the airline had applied for an air operator's certificate (AOC).

On 28 April 2022, the airline launched operations as a scheduled carrier with a flight from Jakarta to Denpasar. The regular flights to Bali were later followed by flights to Yogyakarta on 20 June 2022, with more routes from Jakarta planned. Upon the launch of regular services, the Minister of State Owned Enterprises, Erick Thohir, stated that Pelita Air would be solely focusing on the domestic market as opposed to flying international routes, referring to the size of the domestic Indonesian aviation market. However, later in 2022, reports emerged of plans for the airline to start Hajj operations to Saudi Arabia in 2023. On 18 August 2025, the airline commenced its first cross border flights to Singapore, effectively ending its status as a domestic-only airline.

== Destinations ==
As of June 2024, Pelita Air flies to eight Indonesian destinations out of its hub at Soekarno–Hatta International Airport:

Country	City	Airport	Notes	Refs
Indonesia	Ambon	Pattimura Airport	Terminated	
Indonesia	Balikpapan	Sultan Aji Muhammad Sulaiman Sepinggan Airport		
Indonesia	Banda Aceh	Sultan Iskandar Muda International Airport		
Indonesia	Banjarmasin	Syamsudin Noor International Airport		
Indonesia	Denpasar	Ngurah Rai International Airport		
Indonesia	Kendari	Haluoleo Airport		
Indonesia	Jakarta	Soekarno–Hatta International Airport	Base	
Indonesia	Jayapura	Sentani International Airport	Terminated	
Indonesia	Mataram	Lombok International Airport		
Indonesia	Makassar	Sultan Hasanuddin International Airport		
Indonesia	Medan	Kualanamu International Airport		
Indonesia	Palembang	Sultan Mahmud Badaruddin II International Airport		
Indonesia	Pekanbaru	Sultan Syarif Kasim II International Airport		
Indonesia	Padang	Minangkabau International Airport		]
Indonesia	Pontianak	Supadio International Airport		
Indonesia	Sorong	Domine Eduard Osok Airport	Terminated	
Indonesia	Surabaya	Juanda International Airport		
Indonesia	Yogyakarta	Yogyakarta International Airport		
Singapore	Singapore	Changi Airport		

== Fleet ==
=== Current fleet ===
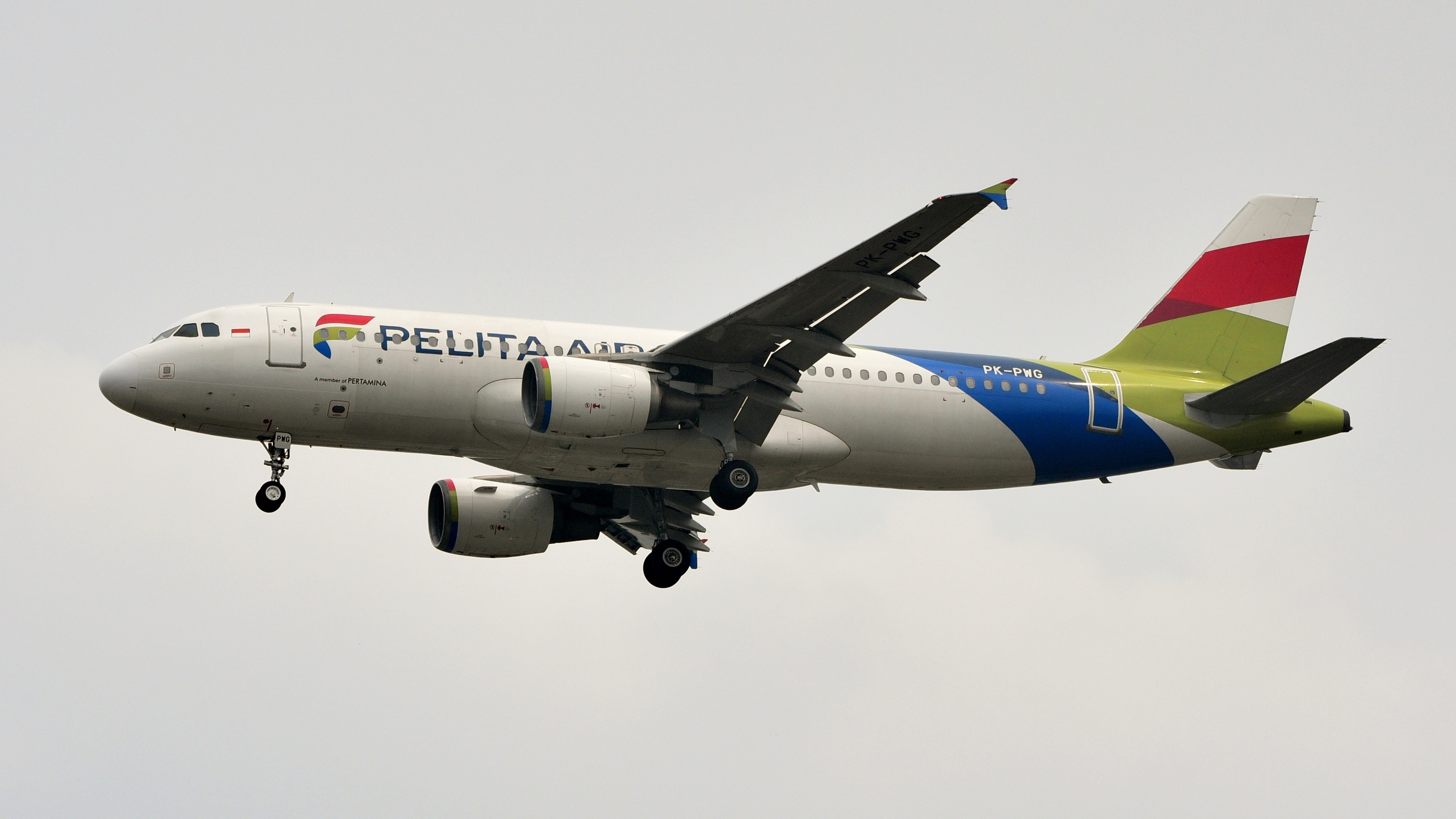
A Pelita Air Airbus A320-200

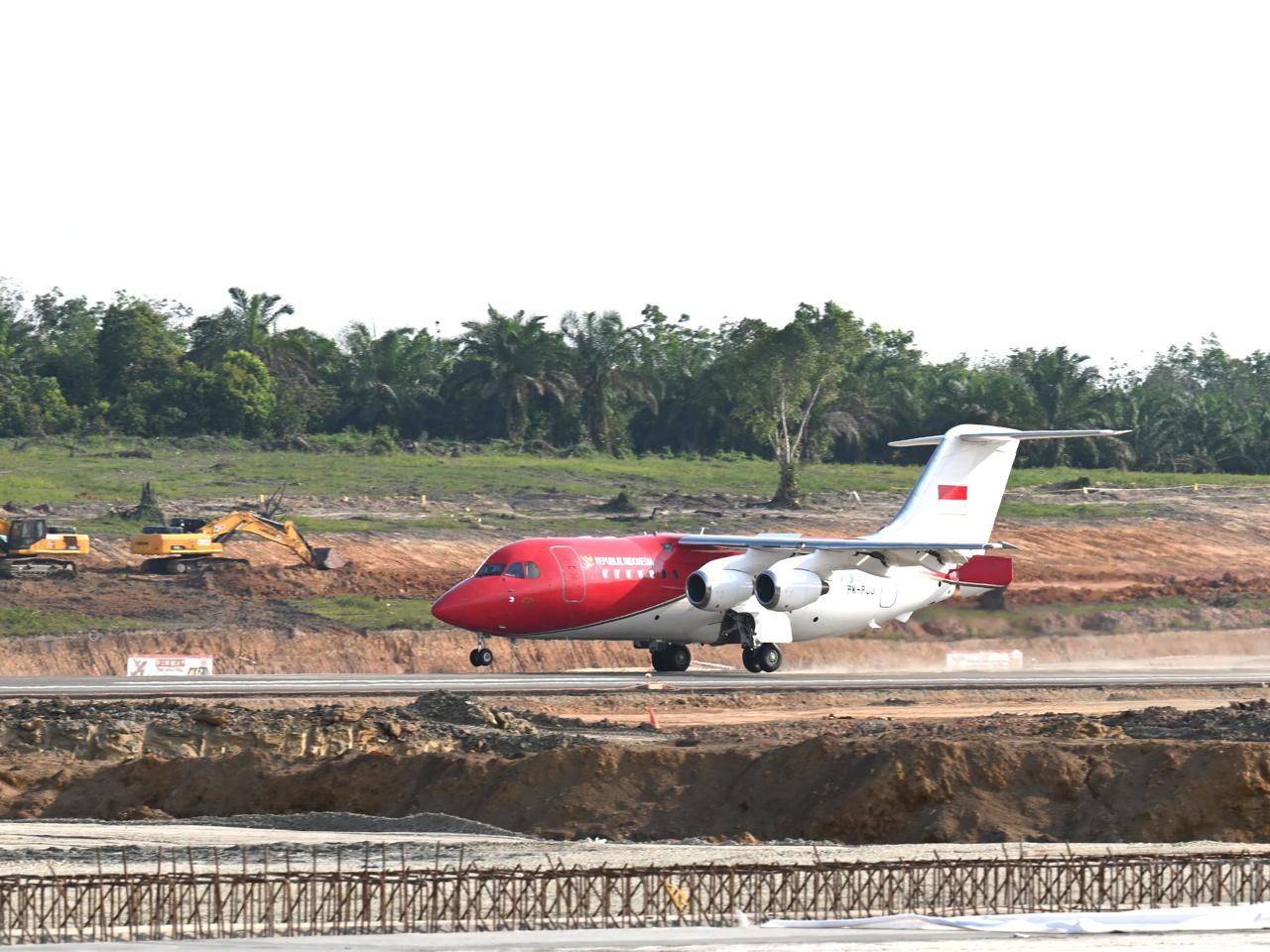
Pelita Air BAe Avro RJ85 during landing at Nusantara International Airport

As of July 2026, Pelita Air operates the following aircraft:

Pelita Air fleet
Aircraft	In service	Orders	Passengers			Notes
Aircraft	In service	Orders	W	Y	Total	Notes
Airbus A320-200	16	49	—	180	180	
Airbus A320-200	16	49	12	138	150	Former Alaska Airlines aircraft.
ATR 42-500	1	—	—	48	48	Used for charter operations.
ATR 72-500	1	—	—	66	66	Used for charter operations.
BAe Avro RJ85	1	—	VIP			Operating for the Indonesian Government
Bell 412	2	—	—	—	13	Charter
MBB Bo 105	2	—	—	—	3	Charter
Sikorsky S-76	6	—	—	—	12	Charter
Pelita Air cargo fleet
Air Tractor AT-802	1	—	—	—	Cargo	Used to carry fuel for Pertamina
ATR 72-500F	2	—	—	—	Cargo	Converted into freighters.
Total	23	51				

=== Historical fleet ===
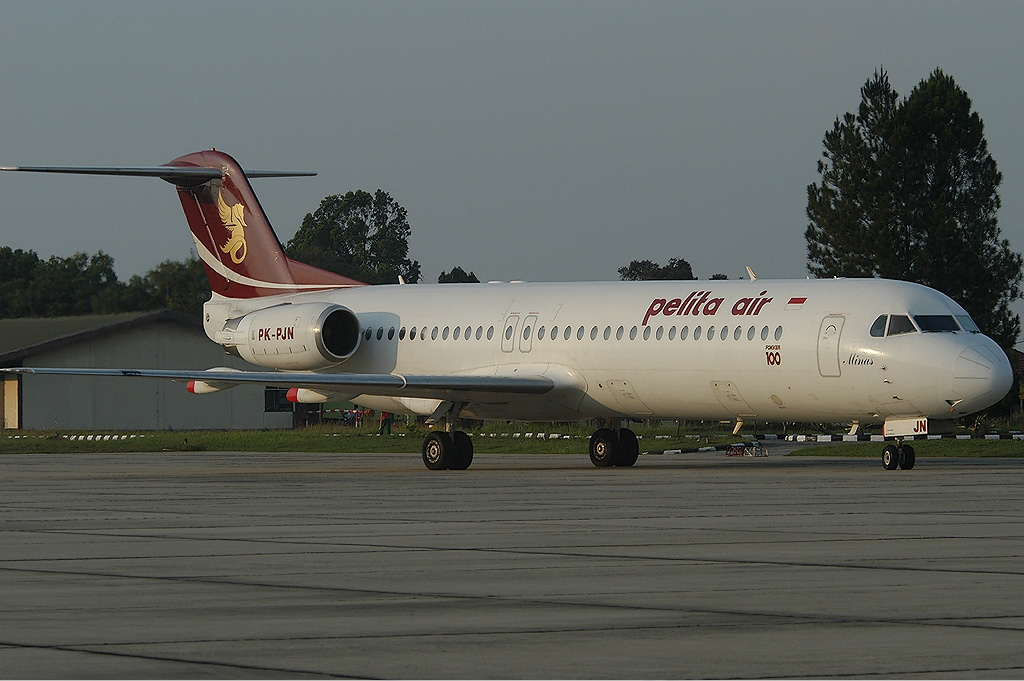
A Pelita Air Fokker 100 at Sultan Syarif Kasim II Airport, Pekanbaru in 2003

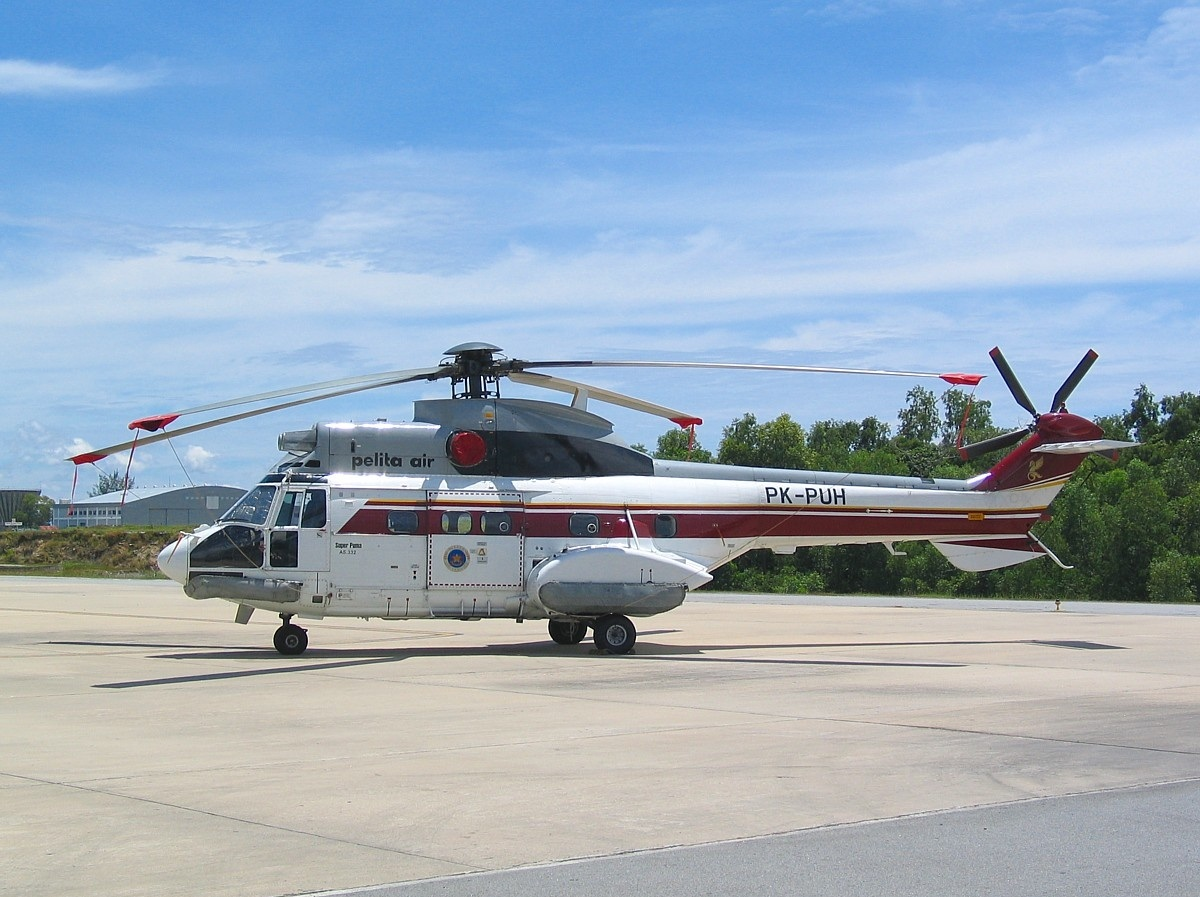
A Pelita Air NAS 332C at Labuan Airport, Malaysia in 2004

Pelita Air has previously operated the following aircraft:

Pelita Air historical fleet
Aircraft	Total	Passengers	Notes
Aérospatiale SA321J Super Frelon	1	27	Registered as PK-PEF
Aérospatiale SA300J Puma	1	16	Registered as PK-PEN
Aérospatiale SA330F	1	16	Registered as PK-PDW
BAC One-Eleven	2	89	
BAe 146-200	1	-	The only BAe 146-200 in the fleet
Bell 212	1	15	The only Bell 212, registered as PK-PDZ
Boeing 707-3M1C	1	VVIP	Registered as PK-PJQ, was used by Sempati Air in Aug 1977, transferred to the Indonesian Government in July 1979, and then to the Indonesian Air Force as A-7002 in Nov. 1982. After a lease back to Pelita in 1985, the aircraft was leased to Garuda Indonesia in 1989 as PK-GAU.
CASA C-212 Aviocar	11	19	
De Havilland Dash 7	6	50	
De Havilland DHC-3 Otter	—	-	Unidentified numbers of aircraft in the fleet. Two aircraft registered as PK-PHA & PK-PHB crashed in 1965.
Fokker 100	6	—	F100s were used for passenger flights; all of the F100s are (presumably) scrapped.
Fokker 70	1	—	The only Fokker 70 in the fleet
Fokker 50	3	—	Fokker 50s were used for passenger flights.
Fokker 28-4000	5	—	PK-PJK had an APU fire after landing in Jalaluddin Airport, Gorontalo. Aircraft damage was minor and the aircraft was able to be repaired.
Fokker 28-1000	4	—	
Fokker F27 Friendship	6	—	Back then, F27s were used to transport cargo and employees. One crashed as PK-PFB, another crashed as PK-PFC in Misool Island due to fuel shortage, and one was registered as PK-CFD (operated by PT. Caltex Pacific Indonesia).
Grumman G-111 Albatross	3	—	Only 3 G-111s were in the fleet. PK-VAA crashed landed near Seletar. (Registration PK-PAM that was formerly used for one of the G-111 was re-used for the ATR 72-500.)
Gulfstream II	2	—	Both registered as PK-PJG & PK-PJZ
Gulfstream III	1	—	Only 1 aircraft in the fleet, registered as PK-PJA
Hawker Siddeley 125-600B	2	—	Both registered as PK-PJD & PK-PJE
Hawker Siddeley 125-3B/RA	1	—	Only one in the fleet, registered as PK-PJR
IPTN NAS 332C Super Puma	2	24 (?)	Both registered as PK-PUG & PK-PUH
King Air 350	1	—	The only King Air 350 in the fleet, registered as PK-RJR
L-1329 JetStar 731	1	—	The only Jestar 731 in the fleet, registered as PK-PJH
Lockheed L-100-30 Hercules	5	Cargo	L-100s used for transmigration and cargo services. One crashed in Hong Kong as PK-PLV, one crash landed in Jayapura as PK-PLU, and one with an unidentified registration overran in South Sudan.
NAMC YS-11	2	64	One of the few NAMC YS-11 operators in Indonesia, both aircraft being registered as PK-PYV & PK-PYW
Shorts S.7 Skyvan 3	3	19	Only 3 in the fleet, registered as PK-PSC, PK-PSF, and PK-PSG
Transall C-160NG	5	Cargo	Two were later used by Manunggal Air and were written off due to an accident, both aircraft registered as PK-VTP & PK-VTQ

== Accidents and incidents ==
- On 23 January 1980, during a flight from Bandung to Wirasaba Air Base via Jakarta, A Pelita Air CASA C-212 Aviocar (registration PK-XCE) flew into a hill in bad weather at 2700 feet, while being cleared to descend from 6500 feet to 4500 feet. It hit a tall rasamala tree on the slope of Mount Sanggabuwana before crashing on the slope of Si Monyet mountain. All 11 occupants were killed.
- On 24 January 1984, A Pelita Air CASA C-212 Aviocar (registration PK-PCL) crashed in Mount Lokon while descending out of 3000 feet, near Manado, North Sulawesi. 6 of the 9 occupants died and the aircraft was written off.
- On 2 January 1990, while on the way to Palembang, a CASA 212 operated by Pelita Air (registration PK-PCM) experienced an engine trouble. The aircraft ditched and sank into Java sea. 7 people were killed.
- On 6 December 2023, Pelita Air Flight 205, an Airbus A320-200 (registration PK-PWD), which was to fly from Surabaya to Jakarta, canceled its takeoff due to a bomb threat at Juanda International Airport, Surabaya. All passengers were asked to disembark, and one person was secured by officers.
- On 19 February 2026, Pelita Air Flight 7101, an Air Tractor AT-802 (registration PK-PAA), crashed at Krayan Hills in Nunukan, North Kalimantan. 1 out of 1 occupant were killed.
