= Pinang Kampai Airport =

Pinang Kampai Airport Bandar Udara Pinang Kampai
- IATA: DUM; ICAO: WIBD

Summary
- Airport type: Public
- Owner: PT Pelita Air Service
- Operator: PT Pelita Air Service
- Serves: Dumai
- Location: Dumai, Riau, Indonesia
- Focus city for: Wings Air
- Time zone: WIB (UTC+07:00)
- Elevation AMSL: 55 ft (17 m)
- Coordinates: 01°36′33.10″N 101°26′00.81″E

Map
- Location of the airport in Sumatra DUM (Indonesia)

Runways
Direction	Length		Surface
Direction	m	ft	Surface
03/21	1,800	5,906	Asphalt

Statistics (2017)
- Passenger: 122646 (▲99.4%)
- Aircraft movements: 3370 (▲72.3%)
- Source: Statistics of Riau Province

Pinang Kampai Airport (IATA: DUM, ICAO: WIBD) is a domestic airport located at Dumai, a city in Riau province. It serves Dumai and surrounding areas. This airport serves flights to and from several cities and towns in Indonesia. This airport is able to serve Boeing 737 Classic.

== History ==
The airport was built by Pertamina, the state oil company of Indonesia to support its operations in the Dumai area. Since the 1980s, the airport has also served charter flights for Chevron Pacific Indonesia, formerly Caltex Pacific Indonesia. These flights are served by Pertamina subsidiary Pelita Air. Since 2009, Pertamina managed the airport together with Dumai city government . After that, some commercial airlines opened routes from and to Dumai, though only a few airlines flew to Pinang Kampai Airport, but this airport experienced more than double the number of passengers in every year. As of 21 December 2017, the airport is officially managed by PT Pelita Air Service again after the contract expired with Dumai city government, but commercial flight activities are still allowed.

== Airport facilities ==
Terminal facilities include:

- Airport cafe
- Restaurant
- Check-in counter
- X-ray baggage scanner

Airside and landside facilities include:

- Jet A-1
- Runway light
- Apron light
- Non-directional beacon (NDB) navigation
- Car park
- Apron
- ATC tower
- Helicopter hangar
- Helipad

== Airlines and destinations ==
Airlines	Destinations
EastIndo	Charter: Pekanbaru
Pelita Air	Charter: Jakarta–Halim Perdanakusuma, Jakarta–Pondok Cabe
Wings Air	Batam (begins 5 December 2026)

== Statistics and traffic ==
=== Traffic ===
Overall operational statistics
Year	Passenger movements	Aircraft movements
2013	42,968	1,234
2014	22,097	1,066
2015	46,704	1,182
2016	61,493	1,956
2017	122,646	3,370

=== Statistics ===
Frequency of flights at Pinang Kampai Airport
Rank	Destinations	Frequency (weekly)	Airline(s)
1	Medan, North Sumatra	7	Wings Air
2	Batam, Riau Islands	7	Wings Air
3	Pekanbaru, Riau	7	Wings Air
4	Jakarta–Halim Perdanakusuma, Jakarta	3	Pelita Air
