= Dazhou Heshi Airport =

Dazhou Heshi Airport 达州河市机场
- IATA: DAX; ICAO: ZUDX

Summary
- Airport type: Public
- Operator: Sichuan Airport Group Co., Ltd
- Serves: Dazhou, Sichuan
- Location: Dachuan District, Dazhou
- Coordinates: 31°07′52″N 107°25′48″E

Map
- Location in Sichuan

Runways
Direction	Length		Surface
Direction	m	ft	Surface
02/20	2,000	6,562	Concrete

Statistics (2021)
- Passengers: 558,207
- Aircraft movements: 8,305
- Cargo (metric tons): 884
- Source: CAAC

Dazhou Heshi Airport
- Simplified Chinese: 达州河市机场
- Traditional Chinese: 達州河市機場
Transcriptions
Standard Mandarin
- Hanyu Pinyin: Dázhōu Héshì Jīchǎng

Dazhou Heshi Airport (Chinese: 达州河市机场) (IATA: DAX, ICAO: ZUDX) is an airport in Dazhou, Sichuan province, China. It was formerly called Daxian Airport. The airport closed on May 18, 2022 and was replaced by Dazhou Jinya Airport for commercial flights. On December 7, 2023 the airport reopened as a general aviation airport.

== History ==
The airport was opened in 1940 as Heshiba Airport. In 1949 it was expanded to be used for civil aviation and renamed to Heshi Airport. In 2019 the airport handled 571,290 passengers and 1369 tons of mail and cargo.

The airport is closed on May 18, 2022 being replaced by Dazhou Jinya Airport for commercial flights. On December 7, 2023 the airport reopened as a general aviation airport. The reopened airport is home to a helicopter rescue base and is used by the nearby UAV factory of Sichuan Tengden.

== See also ==
- List of airports in China
