= Dazhou Jinya Airport =

Dazhou Jinya Airport 达州金垭机场
- IATA: DZH; ICAO: ZUDA

Summary
- Airport type: Public
- Operator: Sichuan Airport Group Co., Ltd
- Serves: Dazhou, Sichuan
- Location: Dachuan District, Dazhou
- Opened: 19 May 2022; 4 years ago
- Coordinates: 31.04°N 107.44°E

Map
- Location of airport in Sichuan

Runways
Direction	Length		Surface
Direction	m	ft	Surface
02/20	2,600	8,530	Concrete

Statistics (2025)
- Passengers: 1,143,396 ▼16.2%
- Cargo (in tons): 927.2 ▼39.0%
- Aircraft movements: 15,433 ▼12.4%
- Source: China's busiest airports by passenger traffic

Dazhou Jinya Airport
- Simplified Chinese: 达州金垭机场
- Traditional Chinese: 達州金埡機場
Transcriptions
Standard Mandarin
- Hanyu Pinyin: Dázhōu Jīnyā Jīchǎng

Dazhou Jinya Airport (IATA: DZH, ICAO: ZUDA) is an airport serving Dazhou, Sichuan, China. It was opened on May 19, 2022 and replaced the old Dazhou Heshi Airport.

Construction of the airport started on 31 October 2016. It is the largest civil aviation airport in Northeast Sichuan. The airport has an annual capacity of 2.35 million passengers and 21,000 tons of cargo. The passenger movements of Dazhou Jinya Airport in 2023 were 1,073,078, making it the 97th busiest airport in China.

== History ==
The history of Dazhou Jinya Airport can be traced back to Dazhou Heshi Airport. In 1940, the Kuomintang government requisitioned 612 mu of land and conscripted 7,000 laborers at Heshiba, 12 kilometers southwest of Dazhou City, to build a makeshift wartime airfield, named "Heshiba Airport" (lit. Heshi Dam Airport). The airport's northern end was at an elevation of 281 meters, and its southern end at 279.20 meters. It had a grass runway, 1100 meters long and 30 meters wide. The airport had no ground facilities and only saw one C-47 military transport aircraft take off and land after its completion. After liberation, the airport was taken over by the People's Liberation Army troops stationed in Dazhou, and later handed over to the local government for management.

In 1949, Dazhou Heshiba Airport was converted into Dazhou Heshi Airport for civil aviation. In October 1959, the Sichuan Provincial People's Government invested 800,000 yuan for the first expansion. The expanded runway was a dirt-gravel surface, 1200 meters long and 30 meters wide. A 244-square-meter cement apron was built, capable of accommodating four Y-5 and one Li-2 aircraft.

On October 15, 1992, the Dazhou Prefecture invested 64.75 million yuan, and the Civil Aviation Administration invested 1 million yuan for the second expansion of Heshi Airport. It resumed operation on December 25, 1994. The expanded runway is 1,800 meters long and 30 meters wide.

On March 24, 2000, Dazhou Heshi Airport was suspended again; on November 26, the third phase of the Dazhou Heshi Airport expansion and renovation project started.

From March 26, 2001 to January 13, 2006, Dazhou Heshi Airport underwent its third expansion and renovation. After the expansion, the airport reached 4C-level standards, with a total investment of approximately 210 million yuan. The runway was lengthened to 2000 meters and widened to 45 meters. New navigation lights, an instrument landing system, and a meteorological observation system were installed. The security checkpoint was equipped with dual-channel security equipment, and check-in and loading adopted a departure system. The terminal building has two floors, accommodating 200 passengers per peak hour, and includes three VIP waiting areas. It can handle medium-sized aircraft such as the Boeing 737 series and Airbus A319.

On August 12, 2015, the relocation and reconstruction project of Dazhou Airport was approved by the State Council and the Central Military Commission. The new airport will be built according to the 4C standard.

In September 2016, the National Development and Reform Commission approved the feasibility study report for the relocation project of Dazhou Airport. The document specified that the airport's initial phase of construction would include a 9,000-square-meter terminal building and an apron with eight Class C aircraft stands.

In June 2020, the relocation project of Dazhou Airport in Sichuan was officially named "Dazhou Jinya Airport". The airport is positioned as a 4C-level domestic feeder airport with an investment of 2.662 billion yuan. It is a relocation project of Dazhou Heshi Airport, located at the junction of Baijie Town, Shiban Street and Jinya Town in Dachuan District, and officially opened to traffic on May 18, 2022. At 00:00 on May 19, 2022, Dazhou Heshi Airport, with an 83-year history, officially completed its civil aviation transportation support mission and subsequently transferred to Dazhou Jinya Airport the following day. The original Dazhou Heshi Airport was simultaneously closed, and its 14 existing routes were relocated to Jinya Airport.

== Airlines and destinations ==
Airlines	Destinations
Air China	Beijing–Capital, Guangzhou, Shenzhen, Wuhan, Zhuhai
Chengdu Airlines	Chengdu–Shuangliu, Jieyang
China Eastern Airlines	Shanghai–Pudong
China Express Airlines	Guiyang, Zhengzhou
China Southern Airlines	Guangzhou
Fuzhou Airlines	Fuzhou,Lanzhou
Loong Air	Hangzhou, Lijiang
Shenzhen Airlines	Shenyang
Sichuan Airlines	Chengdu–Tianfu, Quanzhou, Zhoushan
Urumqi Air	Urumqi, Wenzhou
Xizang Airlines	Lhasa, Nanjing
