= Dos Lagunas Airport =

- IATA: DON; ICAO: MGDL

Summary
- Airport type: Public
- Serves: Biotopo Protegido Naachtun
- Elevation AMSL: 709 ft / 216 m
- Coordinates: 17°41′30″N 89°31′30″W

Map
- Location in Petén Department Location in Guatemala

Runways
| Direction | Length | | Surface |
| Direction | m | ft | Surface |
|---|---|---|---|
| 10/28 | 1,430 | 4,692 | Grass |
- Source: Landings GCM

Dos Lagunas Airport (IATA: DON, ICAO: MGDL) is an airstrip near the Biotopo Protegido Naachtun station and archeological site in Peten Department, Guatemala. Dos Lagunas is part of the Maya Biosphere Reserve.

The airstrip is likely closed. Three aerial image sources show the runway completely overgrown.

== See also ==
- Transport in Guatemala
- List of airports in Guatemala
