= Dwanga Airport =

Airport in Malawi

- IATA: DWA; ICAO: FWDW

Summary
- Airport type: Public
- Serves: Bowa, Malawi
- Elevation AMSL: 1,605 ft / 489 m
- Coordinates: 12°31′06″S 34°07′55″E

Map
- Location of the airport in Malawi

Runways
| Direction | Length | | Surface |
| Direction | ft | m | Surface |
|---|---|---|---|
| 14/32 | 3,980 | 1,212 | Dirt |
- Sources: Google Maps

Dwanga Airport (also Dwangwa) (IATA: DWA, ICAO: FWDW) is an airport serving the village of Bowa, Republic of Malawi.

== See also ==
- Transport in Malawi
