= Dumai =

City in Riau, Indonesia

- City
- City of Dumai; Kota Dumai

Other transcription(s)
  - Chinese: 杜迈
  - Jawi: دوماي
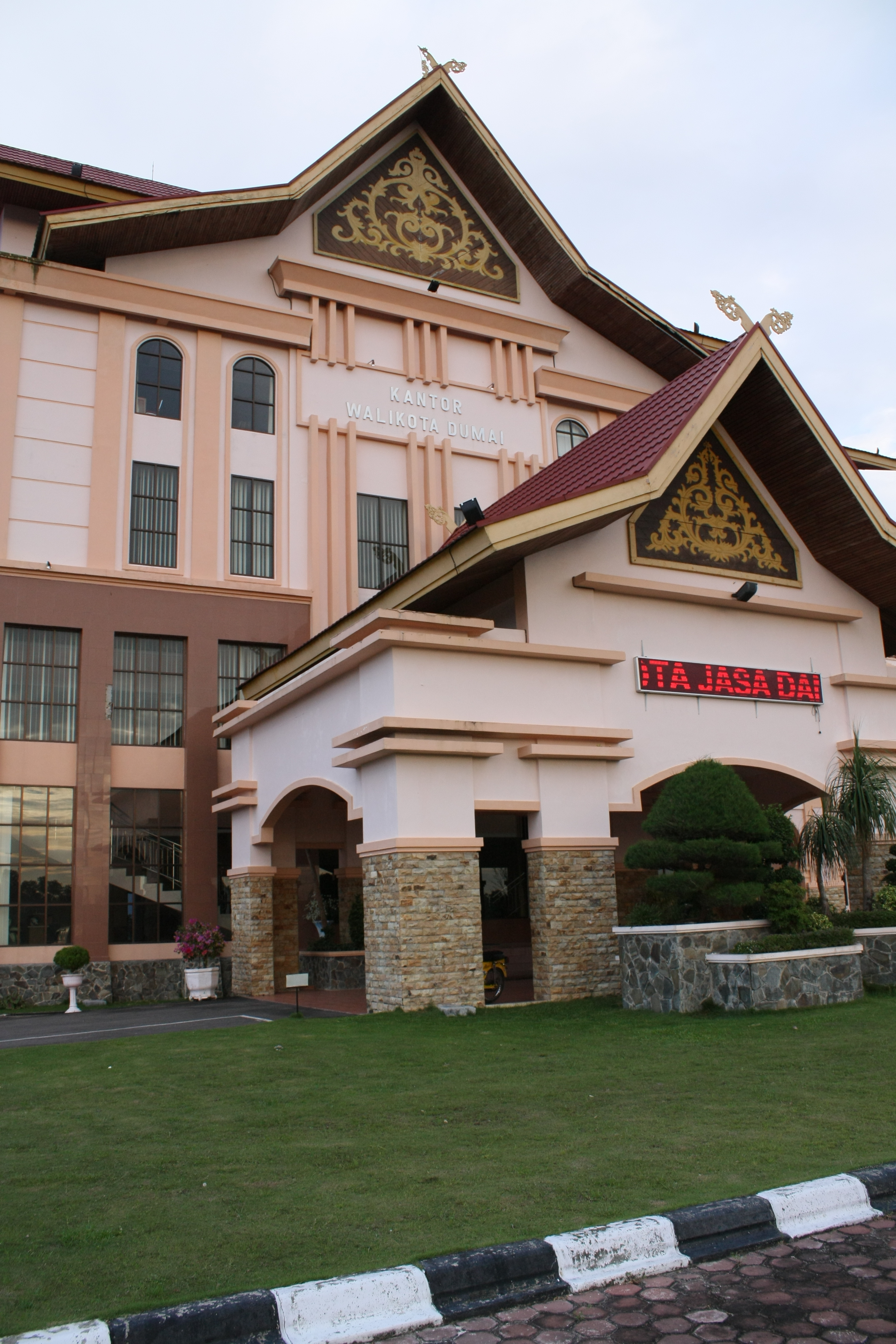
- Office building in Dumai

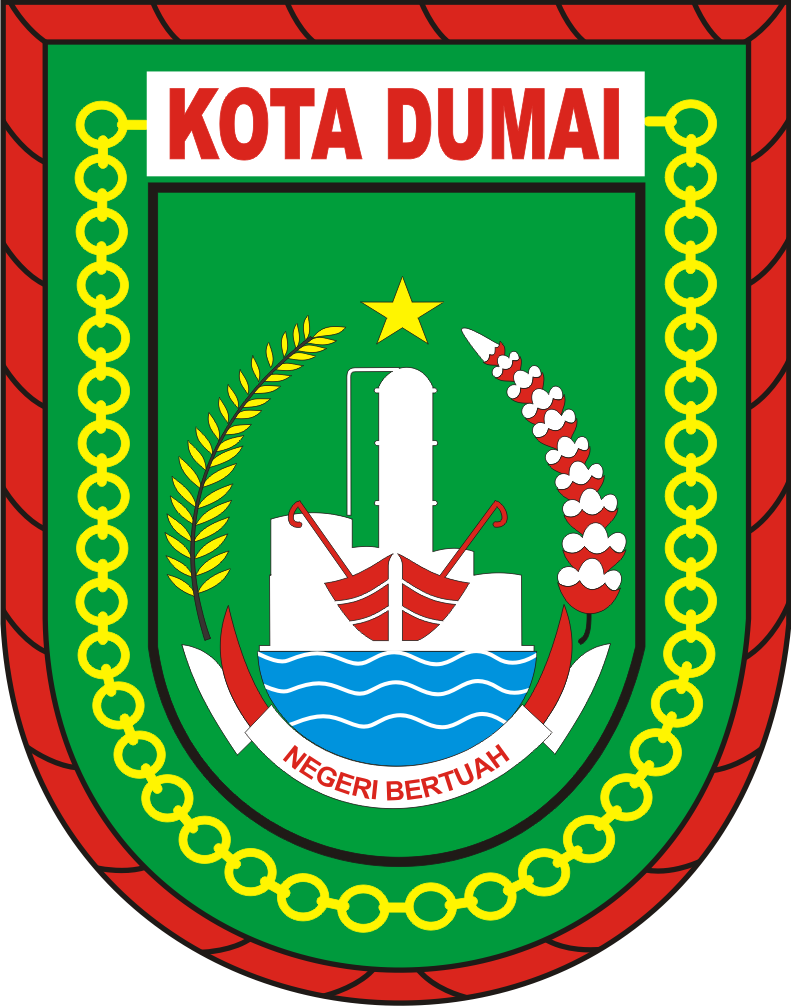
- Flag Coat of arms

- Location within Riau

- Location in Sumatra and Indonesia Dumai (Indonesia)
- Coordinates: 1°40′0″N 101°27′0″E
- Country: Indonesia
- Province: Riau

Government
  - Mayor: Paisal
  - Vice Mayor: Sugiyarto

Area
  - Total: 2,063.24 km^{2} (796.62 sq mi)

Population (mid 2025 estimate)
  - Total: 358,365
  - Density: 173.690/km^{2} (449.856/sq mi)
- Time zone: UTC+7 (WIB)
- Area code: (+62) 765
- Website: http://www.dumaikota.go.id/

Dumai (Jawi: دوماي, Chinese: 杜迈) is a coastal city in Riau Province on the island of Sumatra, Indonesia, about 188 km from Pekanbaru, the provincial capital. The city has an area of 2,063.24 km^{2} and had 358,365 inhabitants at the mid 2025 official estimate (comprising 184,124 males and 174,241 females). Dumai has a domestic airport, Pinang Kampai Airport. The city is an important transport and trade centre, both regionally and internationally, especially for traffic to and from Malaysia. The region is rich in oil (petroleum and palm oil).

== History ==
Currently Dumai City is the second largest city in the province of Riau, but earlier it was a small hamlet on the east coast of Riau Province. It was inaugurated as a city on 20 April 1999, by Law no. 16 of year 1999, having previously been an administrative town (kotif) in Bengkalis Regency.

== Administration ==
At its inception, the city only consisted of three districts, containing 13 urban villages and 9 rural villages, with a population of just 15,699 people and a density of 83.85/km^{2}. The city is now divided into seven districts (kecamatan), tabulated below with their areas and their populations at the 2010 census and the 2020 census, together with the official estimates as of mid-2024. The table also includes the locations of the district administrative centres and the number of administrative villages in each district (all 36 classed as urban kelurahan).

Kode Wilayah	Name of District (kecamatan)	Area in km^{2}	Pop'n census 2010	Pop'n census 2020	Pop'n estimate mid 2025	Admin centre	No. of villages
14.72.03	Bukit Kapur	281.44	38,051	51,564	58,908	Bukit Nenas	7
14.72.05	Medang Kampai	221.29	10,199	16,794	21,011	Teluk Makmur	4
13.72.04	Sungai Sembilan	1,421.59	27,465	41,738	51,204	Lubuk Gaung	6
13.72.01	Dumai Barat (West Dumai)	36.16	89,978	44,292	48,830	Purnama	4
13.72.07	Dumai Selatan (South Dumai)	66.36	^{(a)}	52,791	58,748	Bukit Datuk	5
13.72.02	Dumai Timur (East Dumai)	32.15	88,110	68,930	77,740	Teluk Binjai	5
13.72.06	Dumai Kota (Dumai town)	4.25	^{(a)}	40,673	41,922	Laksamana	5
	Total City	2,063.24	253,803	316,782	358,365		36

Notes: (a) the 2010 populations of the Dumai Selatan and Dumai Kota Districts are included in the figures for Dumai Barat and Dumai Timur Districts, from which they were cut out in 2009.

The 36 villages (Kelurahan) into which those districts are subdivided are:

Kode Wilayah	Name of kelurahan	Area in km^{2}	Pop'n estimate mid 2023	Post code
14.72.03.1001	Bukit Nenas	61.60	9,069	28882
14.72.03.1002	Bukit Kayu Kapur	15.94	6,952	28882
14.72.03.1003	Gurun Panjang	84.76	5,628	28882
14.72.03.1004	Bagan Besar	38.44	9,365	28882
14.72.03.1005	Kampung Baru	63.25	7,835	28882
14.72.03.1006	Bagan Besar Timur	14.03	7,457	28882
14.72.03.1007	Bukit Kapur (village)	58.02	8,857	28882
14.72.05.1001	Teluk Makmur	28.64	5,079	28825
14.72.05.1002	Mundam	28.19	4,541	28825
14.72.05.1003	Guntung	15.73	2,210	28825
14.72.05.1004	Pelintung	97.18	7,008	28825
13.72.04.1001	Lubuk Gaung	96.66	12,694	28826
13.72.04.1002	Tanjung Penyembal	116.96	9,995	28826
13.72.04.1003	Bangsal Aceh	201.48	6,030	28826
13.72.04.1004	Basilam Baru	141.37	6,083	28826
13.72.04.1005	Batu Teritip	543.21	5,713	28826
13.72.04.1006	Sungai Geniot	324.11	6,049	28826

Kode Wilayah	Name of kelurahan	Area in km^{2}	Pop'n estimate mid 2023	Post code
13.72.01.1003	Pangkalan Sesai	3.71	10,670	28824
13.72.01.1006	Purnama	11.57	18,162	28823
13.72.01.1008	Bagan Keladi	17.84	6,816	28821
13.72.01.1009	Simpang Tetap; Darul Ihsan	2.90	10,493	28824
13.72.07.1001	Ratu Sima	4.72	15,190	28825
13.72.07.1002	Bukit Timah	16.17	8,948	28826
13.72.07.1003	Mekar Sari	21.07	7,232	28821
13.72.07.1004	Bukit Datuk	20.45	12,910	28825
13.72.07.1005	Bumi Ayu	4.55	11,362	28813
13.72.02.1002	Teluk Binjai	2.65	19,741	28813
13.72.02.1003	Tanjung Palas	12.72	12,357	28816
13.72.02.1004	Jaya Mukti	3.73	20,648	28815
13.72.02.1006	Buluh Kasap	1.61	6,926	28814
13.72.02.1009	Bukit Batrem	8.10	13,962	28811
13.72.06.1001	Laksamana	0.74	3,617	28821
13.72.06.1002	Rimba Sekampung	1.47	14,576	28822
13.72.06.1003	Dumai Kota (village)	0.79	7,483	28811
13.72.06.1004	Bintan	0.60	6,628	28812
13.72.06.1005	Sukajadi	0.64	9,778	28812

== Economy ==
Macro-economic indicators of the gross Regional Domestic Product (GRDP) Dumai increasing each year since 2000–2005 is a picture of the success of the development of economy in Dumai. To support the increase in GDP that heavy economic development point of Dumai is to maintain the dominance of construction on industrial sectors, trade, transport and buildings in addition to paying attention to the agricultural sector as a producer of industrial raw materials. Rapid economic growth rate has also provided job opportunities for people, so that the social welfare in Dumai increases.

Obstacles faced in addition to capital issues is the Status of land still touted ex HPH. Four districts in Dumai (Sungai Sembilan, Medang Kampai, lime and West Damai) is an area that has the potential of land resources for the development of agribusiness and agro-industries with appropriate technology engineering byocyclo such as rice farming, crops, vegetables, bananas, pineapples, durian, mango, rambutan, palm, cattle (cows, goats, ducks and chickens) as well as the cultivation of farmed freshwater fish (catfish, carp, carp and ornamental fish). more on the produce of the district the river nine to forward is Palm, banana, and crops. Currently the town River nine new basilam village in particular is very deficient means of infra-structures for the construction of the road. Especially the main road construction kaplingan up to the junction with the durian.

== Transportation ==
=== Land ===
There are several transportation modes in Pekanbaru such as taxi, bus, oplet (share taxi), bajaj (auto rickshaw), and ojek (motorcycle taxi). For land transport, Dumai is connected to Trans-Sumatran Highway and Trans-Sumatra Toll Road. Bus services operate to Duri, Padang, Medan, Jambi, Pekanbaru and other cities and regions in Riau Province and Sumatra (Terminal AKAP).

=== Sea ===
Dumai Port (Pelabuhan Dumai) is located in Dumai, connecting Dumai with regions in Riau Province, other destinations in Indonesia, and the world. This port is a major port in Riau.

=== Air ===
Pinang Kampai Airport is a domestic airport that serves daily flights to/from several cities in Indonesia such as Jakarta, Pekanbaru, Medan, Batam, etc. But lately few years after COVID-19 pandemic, its operational has lowered to only few flight per month

== Climate ==
Dumai has a tropical rainforest climate (Af) with heavy rainfall year-round.

Climate data for Dumai
Month	Jan	Feb	Mar	Apr	May	Jun	Jul	Aug	Sep	Oct	Nov	Dec	Year
Mean daily maximum °C (°F)	31.4 (88.5)	31.9 (89.4)	32.4 (90.3)	32.2 (90.0)	32.2 (90.0)	31.9 (89.4)	31.7 (89.1)	31.6 (88.9)	31.5 (88.7)	31.7 (89.1)	31.3 (88.3)	31.3 (88.3)	31.8 (89.2)
Daily mean °C (°F)	26.7 (80.1)	27.1 (80.8)	27.5 (81.5)	27.5 (81.5)	27.6 (81.7)	27.4 (81.3)	27.1 (80.8)	27.1 (80.8)	27.0 (80.6)	27.2 (81.0)	26.9 (80.4)	26.8 (80.2)	27.2 (80.9)
Mean daily minimum °C (°F)	22.1 (71.8)	22.3 (72.1)	22.6 (72.7)	22.9 (73.2)	23.1 (73.6)	22.9 (73.2)	22.6 (72.7)	22.6 (72.7)	22.6 (72.7)	22.7 (72.9)	22.6 (72.7)	22.4 (72.3)	22.6 (72.7)
Average rainfall mm (inches)	200 (7.9)	150 (5.9)	202 (8.0)	225 (8.9)	191 (7.5)	159 (6.3)	159 (6.3)	200 (7.9)	255 (10.0)	293 (11.5)	299 (11.8)	258 (10.2)	2,591 (102.2)
Source: Climate-Data.org

== Tourism ==
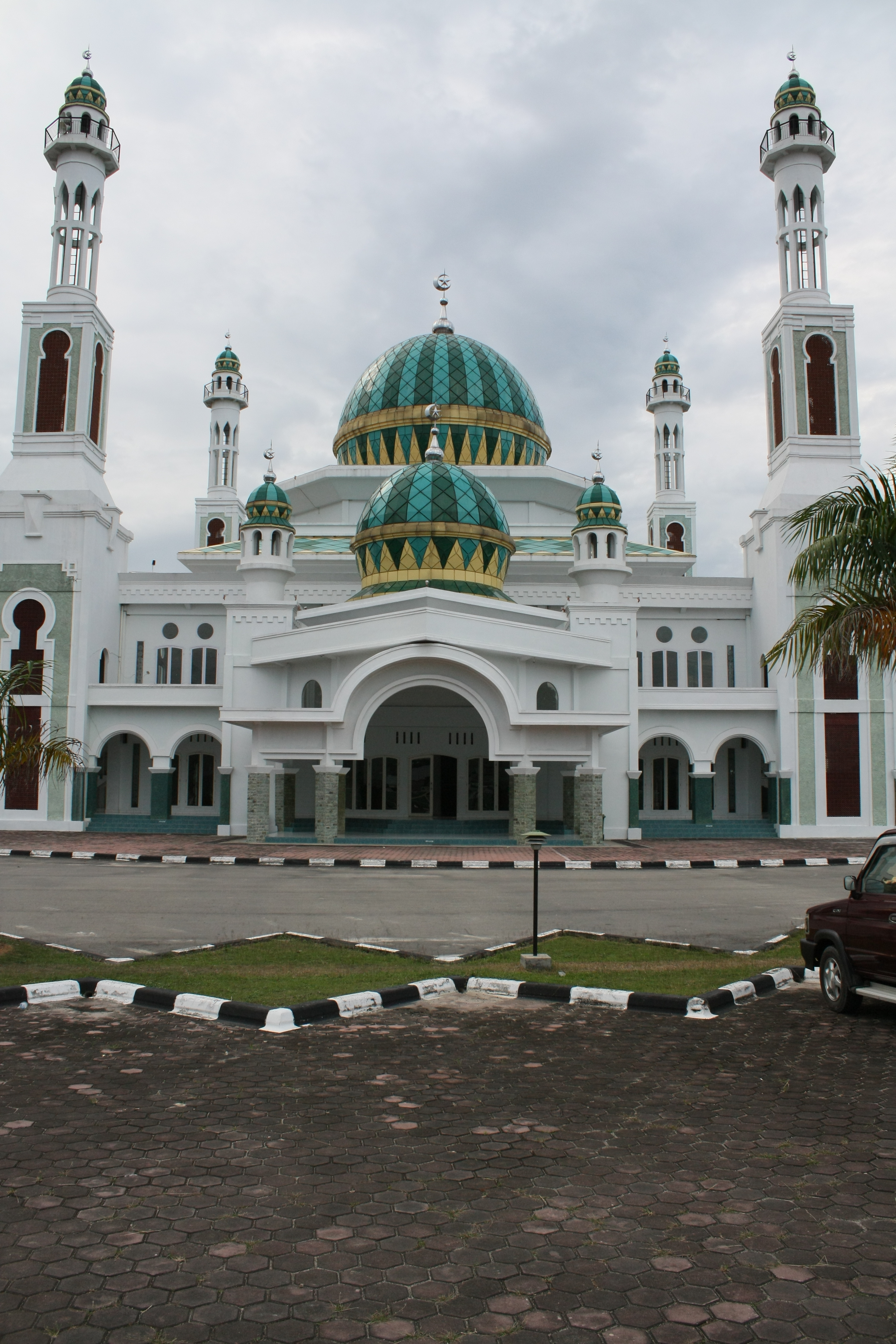
The Great Mosque of Al Mannan

Dumai is situated on the waterfront has the potential of tourism development such as nature tourism, culture and shopping. Several area attractions including conservation areas in district Nine, forest River in district of Western and Eastern Damai Damai, Prosperous Gulf Coast region in district and Lake Kampai Phoebe Flowers of seven in Eastern Damai. As the main gate to enter the Riau Mainland, some tourists have repeatedly visited the Dumai, especially those that like to visit Malacca. Dumai is very easily accessible due to good transportation connections. There are some interesting sights on the way to Dumai, such as the Sakai tribe, tropical forests along the river, and water colour is unique as the color of tea. Moreover, it also can be seen hundreds of bobbing oil who raised the pipe from the bowels of the Earth. Ramayana shopping center on General Sudirman street was opened in 2007. At night, a variety of Indonesian food is sold along Ombak street. Dumai has some interesting places to be visit, among others:

- Teluk Makmur Beach
- Putri Tujuh Grave (Makam Putri Tujuh)
- Seascape of Dumai
- The Great Mosque of Al-Badar (Masjid Raya Al-Badar)
- Bunga Tujuh Lake
- Pelintung Cave (Goa Pelintung)
- Forest Tour of Dumai
- The Great Mosque of Dumai (Masjid Raya Dumai)
- Pawang Leon Grave (Makam Pawang Leon)
- Siti of Sea Grave (Makam Siti Laut)
- The Great Mosque of Al-Mannan (Masjid Raya Al-Mannan)
- Magic Footprint Tiger (Tapak Harimau Sakti)
- Tepak Sirih Monument (Tugu Tepak Sirih)

== Sister Cities ==
Sister Cities	Country
Alor Gajah	Malaysia
