= Djougou Airport =

Airport in Donga, Benin

- IATA: DJA; ICAO: DBBD

Summary
- Airport type: Public
- Serves: Djougou
- Location: Benin
- Elevation AMSL: 1,444 ft / 440 m
- Coordinates: 9°41′31.6″N 1°38′14.9″E

Map
- Location of Djougou Airport in Benin

Runways
Direction	Length		Surface
Direction	m	ft	Surface
10/28	991	3,250	Dirt
- Source: Landings.com

Djougou Airport (IATA: DJA, ICAO: DBBD) is a public use airport located near Djougou, Donga, Benin.
