= Dec =

DEC, dec or Dec may refer to:

== Abbreviations, initialisms, acronyms ==
- December, the 12th month and final month of the year in the Julian and Gregorian calendars
- Decade (log scale), a unit for measuring ratios on a logarithmic scale
- Declination, a term from astronomy
- Diethylcarbamazine, an anti-parasite drug
- Diethyl carbonate, an organic solvent
- Diplome d’Études Collegiales, French name for Diploma of College Studies, a college studies diploma issued in Quebec
- Oratorical Declamation, an event in competitive debate
- Display Energy Certificate, a UK requirement to show a certificate rating energy performance in public buildings
- Direct energy conversion, a scheme for power extraction from nuclear fusion
- An abbreviation for decimal, for example in ASCII charts
- Abbreviation for decathlon, an Olympic athletics event
- Decorated Gothic, a style of church architecture

== Organizations ==
- Delaware Electric Cooperative
- Department of Education and Communities (New South Wales), Australia
- Department of Environment and Conservation (New South Wales), Australia
- Department of Environment and Conservation (Western Australia), Australia
- New York State Department of Environmental Conservation, New York, United States
- Dheeraj and East Coast LLC, Dubai
- Digital Equipment Corporation, a defunct computer and technology company
- Disasters Emergency Committee, coordinates fifteen disaster relief charities in the United Kingdom
- Distance Education Council, former body for open and distance education, see Distant Education Bureau
- Dubai Economic Council, a policy-making body of the government of Dubai

== People ==
- Declan Donnelly (from Ant & Dec), a United Kingdom television presenter
- Francis E. Dec (1926–1996), American outsider writer and lawyer

== Places ==
- Deč, a village in Serbia
- Decatur Airport, Decatur, Illinois (IATA airport code DEC)
- Derwent Entertainment Centre, an entertainment centre in Hobart, Australia
- Doncaster Education City, a development in South Yorkshire
