= Dugong Beach Lodge Airstrip =

- IATA: DGK; ICAO: none

Summary
- Location: Dugong Beach Lodge, Mozambique
- Elevation AMSL: 1 m / 3 ft
- Coordinates: 22°08′03″S 035°26′37″E

Map
- Location in Mozambique

Runways
Direction	Length		Surface
Direction	m	ft	Surface
08/26	1,000	3,281	Asphalt
- Sources: World Aero Data,

Dugong Beach Lodge Airstrip (IATA: DGK) is an airport serving Dugong Beach Lodge, Inhambane Province, Mozambique.

== See also ==
- List of airports in Mozambique
