= Pondok Cabe Airport =

Airport serving South Tangerang, Banten, Indonesia

Pondok Cabe Airport Bandar Udara Pondok Cabe
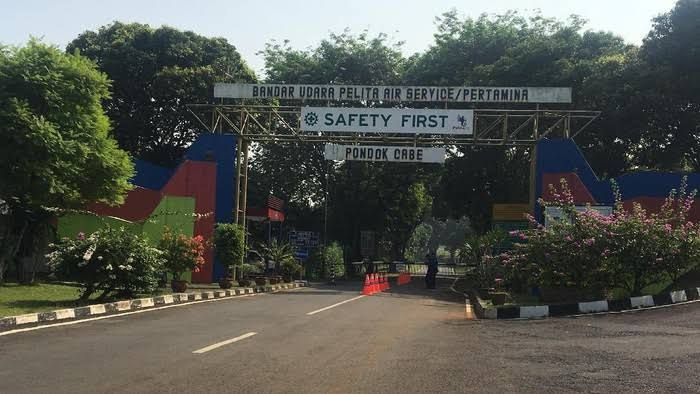
- The gate of Pondok Cabe Airport in 2021
- IATA: PCB; ICAO: WIHP

Summary
- Airport type: Public / Military
- Owner/Operator: Pelita Air Service
- Serves: South Tangerang, Depok, and Greater Jakarta
- Location: Pondok Cabe, Pamulang, South Tangerang, Banten, Indonesia
- Opened: 3 March 1989; 37 years ago
- Time zone: WIB (UTC+07:00)
- Elevation AMSL: 67 m / 221 ft
- Coordinates: 6°20′13.05″S 106°45′53.99″E

Map
- Location in Depok Location in Java Location in Indonesia

Runways
Direction	Length		Surface
Direction	ft	m	Surface
18/36	6,516	1,986	Asphalt

Pondok Cabe Airport (IATA: PCB, ICAO: WIHP) is a combined civilian and military airport in Pondok Cabe, Pamulang, South Tangerang, Banten, Indonesia. The airport is owned by the state oil company Pertamina and operated by Pelita Air Service, which also owned Indopelita Aircraft Services that has a maintenance hangar at this airport. Pondok Cabe does not handle regular airline traffic. Other than serving as the Maintenance, repair and overhaul base for Pelita Air Service and PT. Indonesia Defence Services, the airport is also the home of the Aviation Wing of the Indonesian National Police, CASA 212 equipped- Multipurpose air squadron of the Indonesian Army and Naval Aviation of Indonesian Navy as well as Portela Jaya Light-sport aircraft hangar.

The airport opened on 3 March 1989.

Pondok Cabe Airport serves Ciputat, Cinere, Depok, other parts of Depok and districts in South Jakarta. The airport is located in South Tangerang and not far from the border of Cinere in Depok, Pamulang, West and East Ciputat in South Tangerang, and Cilandak and Jagakarsa in South Jakarta. It has a runway with a length of 1,986 metres (6,516 ft).

There has been discussion to develop Pondok Cabe into a commercial airport since 2008. Indonesian flag carrier Garuda Indonesia even planned to open a base at Pondok Cabe Airport by the end of 2016. However, since Pondok Cabe airport shares the same airspace as Halim Perdanakusuma International Airport, Pondok Cabe cannot be developed further as a commercial airport as initially planned.

== Airlines and destinations ==
As of June 2025, there are no scheduled flights operate in this airport.
