= German Evangelical Church in Bohemia, Moravia and Silesia =

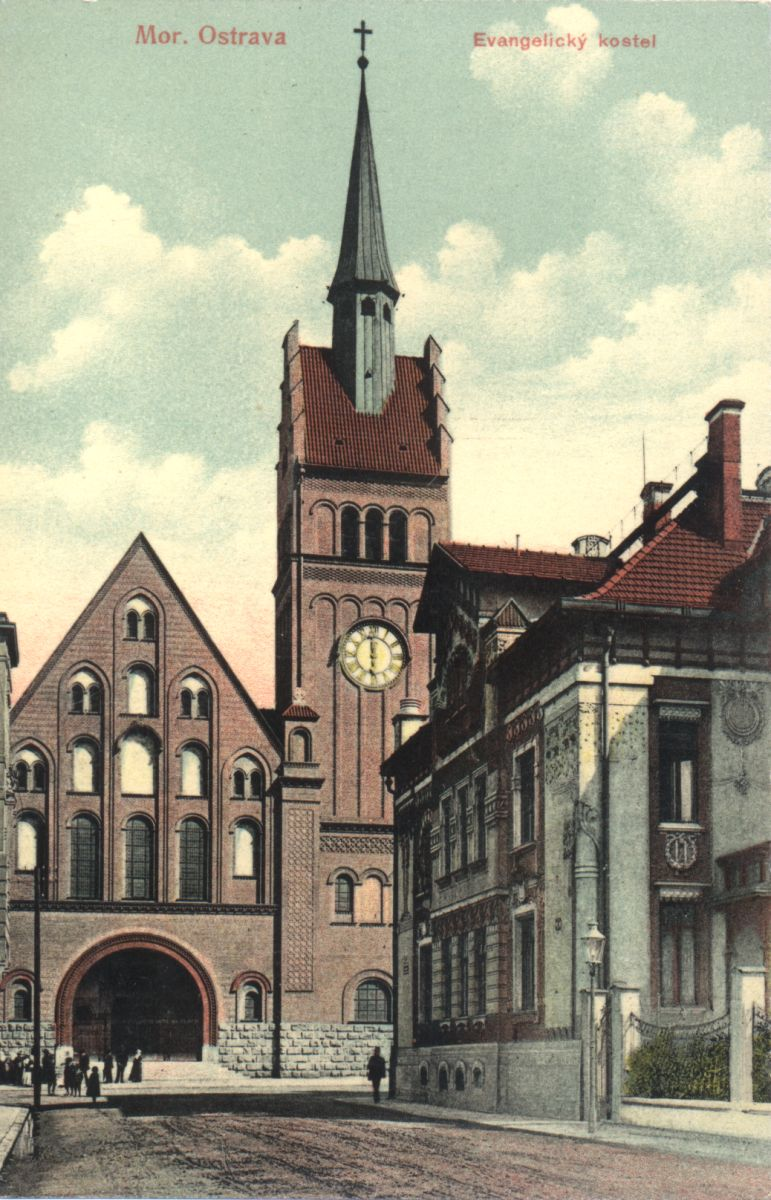
Former DEK Church in Ostrava

German Evangelical Church in Bohemia, Moravia and Silesia (German: Deutsche Evangelische Kirche in Böhmen, Mähren und Schlesien, abbrev. DEK; Czech: Německá evangelická církev v Čechách, na Moravě a ve Slezsku) was an independent church body which existed in Czechoslovakia from 1919 until 1945. The Church was established after the dissolution of Austria-Hungary as one of the successors of the Evangelical Churches of the Augsburg and Helvetic Confessions in the Austrian Empire maintaining German-speaking Protestant churches in the Czech lands. The Czech-speaking Protestants created an independent Evangelical Church of Czech Brethren.

In 1930, the church had more than 130,000 members. The Church was mainly Lutheran. It ceased to exist due to the Expulsion of Germans from Czechoslovakia after World War II. Afterwards, most of its church buildings have been given to the Czechoslovak Church and the Evangelical Church of Czech Brethren.

== Sources ==
- Nešpor, Zdeněk R. (2011). "Mizení náboženství z veřejného prostoru. Kostely, kaple, modlitebny a fary Německé evangelické církve". Lidé města / Urban People (in Czech). 13 (3). Sociologický ústav AV ČR, v. v. i.: 397–441. ISSN 1212-8112.
