= Deqing Moganshan Airport =

Airport in Zhejiang, China

- IATA: DEQ; ICAO: none

Summary
- Airport type: Public
- Serves: Deqing
- Location: Moganshan High-Tech Industrial Development Zone, Deqing, Zhejiang, China
- Opened: November 30, 2018
- Coordinates: 30°30′15″N 120°06′26″E

Map
- Location in Zhejiang

Runways
Direction	Length		Surface
Direction	m	ft	Surface
	600	1,969

Deqing Moganshan Airport (Chinese: 德清莫干山机场) (IATA: DEQ), located in Moganshan High-Tech Industrial Development Zone, Deqing, Huzhou, Zhejiang, China, is the nearest general aviation airport to Hangzhou, and also the largest among general aviation airports in eastern China.

== History ==
In October 2018, the Civil Aviation Administration of China issued "A1 General Aviation Airport License" to the airport. An inaugural flight ceremony was held later that year.

In May 2019 the airport received 3-letter-code "DEQ" from IATA.

== Facilities ==
- One airport terminal and one runway which is 600 meters long (will be upgraded to 1800 meters)
- Apron: 54,000 square meters (capacity: 25 for fixed-wing aircraft and 19 for helicopters)
- Hangar: 6,700 square meters
