= Dabra Airport =

- IATA: DRH; ICAO: WAJC

Summary
- Location: Dabra, Mamberamo Raya Regency, Papua
- Coordinates: 3°16′14″S 138°36′48″E

Map
- Location in Papua

Dabra Airport is an airport in Dabra, Indonesia.
