= List of the busiest airports in Indonesia =

In this article, the busiest airports in Indonesia are measured according to data presented by the Airport Council International organization and the Angkasa Pura companies.

== Passenger traffic ==
Rank	Airport name	Province	City served	IATA	ICAO	2008	2009	2010	2011	2012	2013	2014	2015	2016	2017	2018	2019	2020
1	Soekarno–Hatta International Airport	Banten	Jakarta	CGK	WIII	32,172,114	37,143,719	44,355,998	51,178,188	57,772,864	60,137,347	57,221,169	54,291,336	58,700,000	63,015,620	65,893,904		
2	Ngurah Rai International Airport	Bali	Denpasar	DPS	WADD	8,470,566	9,621,714	11,120,171	12,780,563	14,188,694	15,630,839	17,271,415	17,108,387	19,986,415	21,052,592	23,779,178		
3	Juanda International Airport	East Java	Surabaya	SUB	WARR	8,879,296	10,633,725	11,139,149	13,778,287	16,445,570	17,683,955	17,285,085	17,143,912	19,483,844	20,127,844	20,951,063		
4	Sultan Hasanuddin International Airport	South Sulawesi	Makassar	UPG	WAAA	4,703,118	5,063,860	6,546,831	7,456,381	8,580,802	9,634,237	8,848,354	9,306,184	10,672,942	12,294,780	13,537,770		
5	Kualanamu International Airport	North Sumatra	Medan	KNO	WIMM	4,816,852	5,852,076	6,616,935	7,170,107	7,991,914	8,358,705	8,059,796	8,004,791	8,956,724	9,579,748	10,455,953		
6	Adisutjipto Airport	Special Region of Yogyakarta	Yogyakarta	JOG	WAHH	2,793,769	3,368,228	3,690,350	4,292,156	4,998,028	5,775,947	6,236,578	6,380,336	7,208,557	7,819,889	8,430,622		
7	Halim Perdanakusuma International Airport	Special Capital Region of Jakarta	Jakarta	HLP	WIHH				201,348	199,425	210,814	1,646,864	3,059,153	5,614,005	6,920,999	7,400,000		
8	Hang Nadim International Airport	Riau Islands	Batam	BTH	WIDD		2,161,023	3,272,499	4,305,695			4,772,873	5,030,785	6,120,000	6,355,113	6,500,000		
9	Sultan Mahmud Badaruddin II International Airport	South Sumatra	Palembang	PLM	WIPP				2,598,274	2,902,129	3,032,629	3,258,834	3,384,464	3,899,187	4,623,285	5,126,298		
10	Jenderal Ahmad Yani International Airport	Central Java	Semarang	SRG	WAHS	1,418,099	1,656,668	2,018,818	2,432,511	3,006,808	3,295,022	3,469,395	3,682,108	4,224,295	4,426,428	5,038,603		
11	Husein Sastranegara Airport	West Java	Bandung	BDO	WICC				937,849	1,872,985	2,533,887	2,927,304	3,146,807	3,696,175	3,980,000	4,310,000		
12	Supadio International Airport	West Kalimantan	Pontianak	PNK	WIOO				2,133,545	2,291,470	2,307,322	2,502,957	2,713,259	3,182,167	3,447,254	4,220,000		
13	Lombok International Airport	West Nusa Tenggara	Mataram	LOP	WADL	1,049,395	1,173,913	1,406,031	1,519,624	1,836,051	2,167,619	2,417,875	2,552,399	3,450,000	3,677,477	4,139,371		
14	Sultan Syarif Kasim II International Airport	Riau	Pekanbaru	PKU	WIBB	1,164,215	1,260,235	1,665,673	2,541,431	2,772,254	3,257,547	2,993,872	2,670,046	3,346,810	4,465,977	4,135,762		
15	Minangkabau International Airport	West Sumatra	Padang	PDG	WIEE			1,653,401	2,270,354	2,643,719	2,789,597	2,791,411	3,169,122	3,618,642	3,954,961	4,130,000		
16	Sam Ratulangi International Airport	North Sulawesi	Manado	MDC	WAMM				1,820,719	2,092,768	2,322,162	2,016,136	2,113,737	2,671,997	2,802,544	2,819,640		
17	Radin Inten II International Airport	Lampung	Bandar Lampung	TKG	WICT			690,666	848,500		1,540,889	634,497	1,419,342		2,463,703	2,643,225		
18	Adisoemarmo International Airport	Central Java	Solo	SOC	WARQ	741,530	773,687	968,271	1,195,812	1,395,761	1,511,228	1,417,576	1,525,013	1,640,593	2,683,853	2,639,301		
19	Sentani International Airport	Papua	Jayapura	DJJ	WAJJ			1,070,527				1,333,625	1,728,549	1,929,813	2,207,997	2,334,614		
20	Depati Amir Airport	Bangka Belitung	Pangkal Pinang	PGK	WIPK				1,325,522	1,484,357	1,467,118	1,401,308	1,658,920	1,914,006	2,000,194	2,089,803		
21	El Tari Airport	East Nusa Tenggara	Kupang	KOE	WATT	726,886	826,195	932,825	1,105,531	1,314,337	1,369,557	1,310,734	1,523,342		1,763,107	2,033,039		
22	Sultan Thaha Airport	Jambi	Jambi City	DJB	WIPA				1,014,963	1,117,909	1,282,244	1,316,379	1,168,219	1,639,873	1,773,721	1,832,000		
23	Domine Eduard Osok Airport	West Papua	Sorong	SOQ	WASS			347,355					798,607	978,331	1,220,019	1,644,952		
24	Haluoleo Airport	Southeast Sulawesi	Kendari	KDI	WAWW			347,355			889,364	841,372	886,816	1,241,328	1,473,897	1,544,643		
25	Pattimura Airport	Maluku	Ambon	AMQ	WAPP	534,444	662,724	719,254	656,088	1,030,979	1,002,861	1,192,375	1,318,041		1,364,210	1,517,688		
26	Syamsudin Noor International Airport	South Kalimantan	Banjarmasin	BDJ	WAOO	1,765,955	2,079,022	2,619,867	3,103,191	3,651,249	3,888,993	3,714,463	3,546,554	3,613,473	3,588,643	3,854,561		1,466,132
27	Mutiara SIS Al-Jufrie International Airport	Central Sulawesi	Palu	PLW	WAFF				746,630		897,999		672,698	1,339,869		1,366,673		
28	Abdul Rachman Saleh Airport	East Java	Malang	MLG	WARA			221,589			526,038	619,782	722,000	859,878	1,092,461	1,332,000		
29	Sultan Iskandar Muda International Airport	Aceh	Banda Aceh	BTJ	WITT				705,719	672,695	711,796	721,727	748,721	741,438	1,132,412	1,175,897		
30	Fatmawati Soekarno Airport	Bengkulu	Bengkulu City	BKS	WIPL		459,303	487,311	558,750			736,315				1,065,479		
31	H.A.S. Hanandjoeddin International Airport	Bangka Belitung	Tanjung Pandan	TJQ	WIOD		270,721	330,582	395,544		406,361	405,661	421,211		976,585	1,044,084		
32	Juwata Airport	North Kalimantan	Tarakan	TRK	WALR			837,414	912,998		800,902	970,580	1,002,484			1,030,222		
33	Tjilik Riwut Airport	Central Kalimantan	Palangkaraya	PKY	WAOP			461,508			706,867	798,837	792,180		934,034	1,025,570		
34	Sultan Aji Muhammad Sulaiman Sepinggan Airport	East Kalimantan	Balikpapan	BPN	WALL	3,576,380	4,311,322	5,105,031	5,680,961	6,620,750	6,586,997	7,701,216	7,374,517	7,510,090	7,380,121	7,553,190		966,196
35	Sultan Babullah Airport	North Maluku	Ternate	TTE	WAMT			342,313							860,909	911,487		
36	Rendani Airport	West Papua	Manokwari	MKW	WASR			357,662			420,249	497,736		552,429	638,732	708,923		
37	Jalaluddin Airport	Gorontalo	Gorontalo City	GTO	WAMG		172,937	219,182		381,082			474,876	528,268	600,149	686,339		
38	Iskandar Airport	Central Kalimantan	Pangkalan Bun	PKN	WAGI				224,293				436,264	519,581	677,770	662,245		
39.	Aji Pangeran Tumenggung Pranoto International Airport	East Kalimantan	Samarinda	AAP	WALS											100,900	1,112,700	572,918
40	Kalimarau Airport	North Kalimantan	Tanjung Redeb	BEJ	WAQT						480,594				489,864	522,307		
41	Komodo International Airport	East Nusa Tenggara	Labuan Bajo	LBJ	WATO				130,317		189,237	265,521	200,212	150,967		470,000		
42	H. Asan Airport	Central Kalimantan	Sampit	SMQ	WAOS		1,687,250	1,773,118	2,600,121						283,350	443,537		
43	Mopah Airport	Papua	Merauke	MKQ	WAKK					244,962	306,485		300,332	363,960	412,447	443,471		
44	Rahadi Oesman Airport	West Kalimantan	Ketapang	KTG	WIOK				156,577							433,764		
45	Sultan Muhammad Salahudin Airport	West Nusa Tenggara	Bima	BMU	WADB				84,789	120,790	151,559	142,168	134,977	245,379	295,732	378,931		
46	Raja Haji Fisabilillah Airport	Riau Islands	Tanjung Pinang	TNJ	WIDN				231,386	291,384	252,501	265,407	258,936	274,509	364,000	375,000		
47	Frans Kaisiepo Airport	Papua	Biak	BIK	WABB				366,385	410,495	429,758	346,891	361,410					
48	Wamena Airport	Papua	Wamena	WMX	WAJW			201,710							401,068			
49	Binaka Airport	North Sumatra	Gunung Sitoli	GNS	WIMB				144,997	201,481	207,515	207,544	225,147	332,673		293,301		
50	Betoambari Airport	Southeast Sulawesi	Baubau	BUW	WAWB				90,219		105,599	88,788	135,663	122,676	242,459	242,333		
51	H. Hasan Aroeboesman Airport	East Nusa Tenggara	Ende	ENE	WATE		76,578	116,692	129,084			180,297	208,284	222,145	238,678	237,743		
52	Mozes Kilangin Airport	Papua	Timika	TIM	WABP			429,774								40,061		
53	Kertajati International Airport	West Java	Bandung	KJT	WICA											32,038		
54	Yogyakarta International Airport	Special Region of Yogyakarta	Yogyakarta	YIA	WAHI													
55	Banyuwangi Airport	East Java	Banyuwangi	BWX	WADY													
56	Dhoho Airport	East Java	Kediri	DHX	WARD													

- Polonia International Airport (MES) closed in 2013, switched to Kualanamu International Airport (KNO)
- Kemayoran Airport (JKT) closed in 1985, switched to Soekarno–Hatta International Airport (CGK)
- Temindung Airport (SRI) closed in 2018, switched to Aji Pangeran Tumenggung Pranoto International Airport (AAP)
