= LKI (disambiguation) =

LKI may refer to:

- Lazare Kaplan International, a diamond manufacturing and distribution company based in New York City
- lki, the ISO 639-3 code for Laki language
- Liga Komunista Iraultzailea, a political party in Spain
- Lasikin Airport, the IATA code LKI

== See also ==
- LK I, a German light tank prototype of the First World War
