= Kualanamu International Airport =

International airport serving Medan, Indonesia

Kualanamu International Airport Bandar Udara Internasional Kualanamu

- IATA: KNO; ICAO: WIMM; WMO: 96035

Summary
- Airport type: Public
- Owner: Government of Indonesia
- Operator: InJourney Airports
- Serves: Medan metropolitan area
- Location: Deli Serdang Regency, North Sumatra, Indonesia
- Opened: 25 July 2013; 13 years ago
- Operating base for: Citilink; Indonesia AirAsia; Lion Air; Super Air Jet; Wings Air
- Time zone: WIB (UTC+07:00)
- Elevation AMSL: 7 m (23 ft)
- Coordinates: 03°38′32″N 98°53′7″E
- Website: avi.id/en

Maps
- Sumatra region in Indonesia

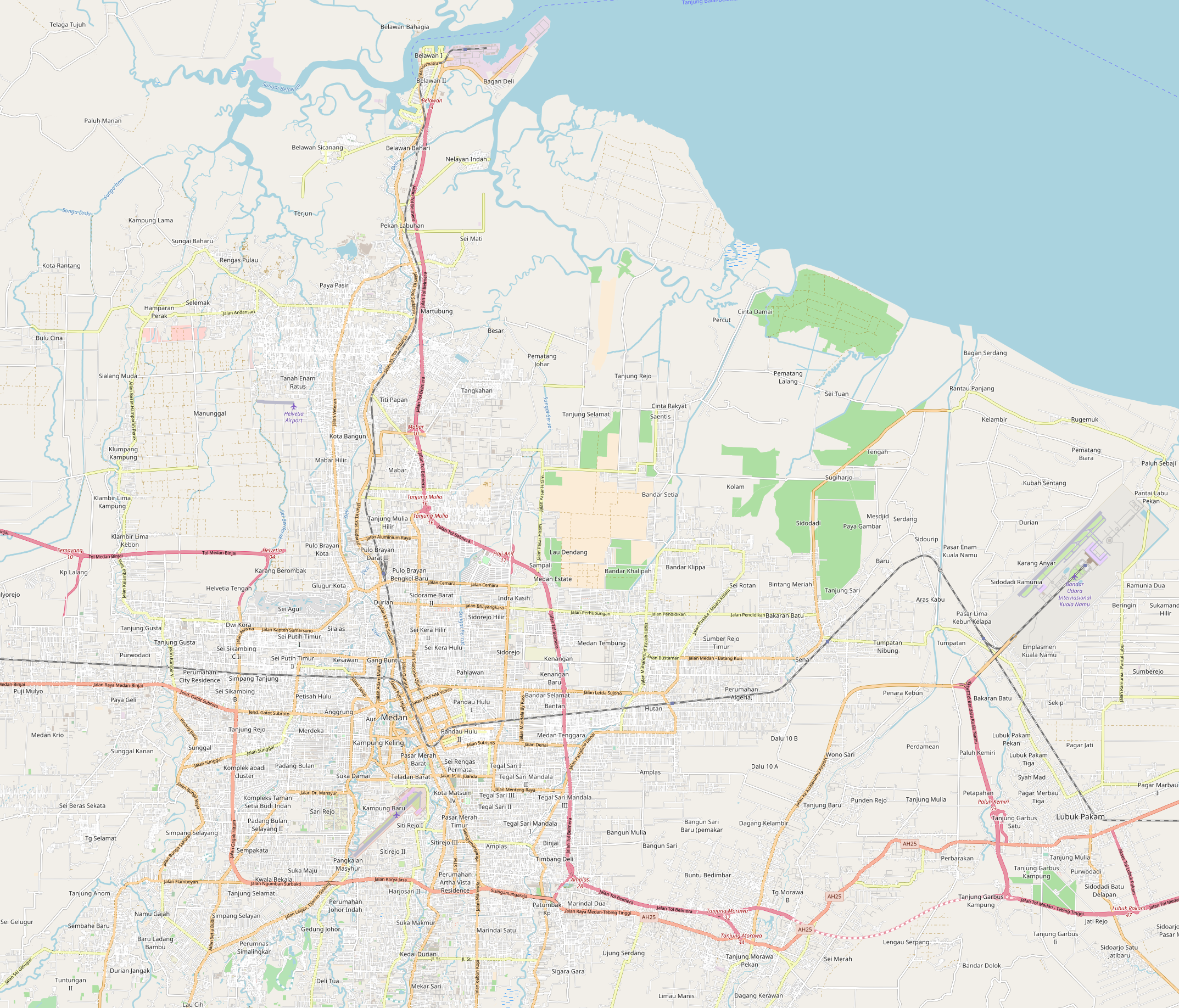
- Location in Medan Location in Sumatra Location in Indonesia Location in Southeast Asia Location in Asia

Runways
Direction	Length		Surface
Direction	m	ft	Surface
05/23	3,750	12,303	Asphalt

Statistics (2024)
- Passengers: 7,000,127 (▼5.3%)
- Cargo (tonnes): 59,260 (▲23.0%)
- Aircraft movements: 53,224 (▼9.7%)
- Source: DGCA

Kualanamu International Airport (IATA: KNO, ICAO: WIMM) — often spelled as Kuala Namu and informally abbreviated KNIA — is an international airport serving Medan, Indonesia, and other parts of North Sumatra. It is located in Deli Serdang Regency, 23 kilometres (14 mi) east of downtown Medan. Kualanamu is the third-largest airport in Indonesia after Jakarta Soekarno–Hatta and Bandung Kertajati, and the fifth busiest airport in Indonesia as of 2018, as well as the first Indonesian airport to receive a four-star rating from Skytrax.

The airport was opened to the public on 25 July 2013, handling all flights and services from Polonia International Airport, an airport located at the centre of Medan which was deemed dangerous. The airport was built on the former site of an oil palm plantation of company Perkebunan Nusantara II Tanjung Morawa.

The airport is expected to become the new international transit center in Sumatra and the western part of Indonesia. It is part of the Indonesian central government's "Masterplan to Accelerate and Expand Economic Development in Indonesia" (MP3EI) program. The airport was also considered as a candidate for ASEAN Single Aviation Market (ASEAN-SAM), an open skies policy among member countries in the Southeast Asia region which started in 2015.

== Etymology ==
The name of the airport was reported to be a suggestion from the people of Karo to the government and later granted by the Ministry of Transportation. The name consists of two words: 'Kuala,' a Malay and Indonesian word for 'river mouth;' and 'Namu' or 'Namo,' the Karonese for 'deep sea.' Thus, 'Kualanamu' means 'meeting point.' Kualanamu is one of the very few airports in the country not named after Indonesian heroes. It could have also been inspired by Kuala Lumpur International Airport.

== History ==
Polonia Airport was the site of several accidents. It is located in the centre of the city, giving a challenging takeoff path and a relatively short runway. The development of Kualanamu Airport initiated in 1991. In a visit to Medan, Azwar Anas, Minister of Transport at the time, stated that for the sake of aviation safety, a new airport would be developed outside of the city of Medan.

Preparation of construction began in 1997, but the Asian Financial Crisis that started in the same year postponed the development of it. Demands for the new airport continued following the Mandala Airlines Flight 091 accident in September 2005 that occurred shortly after taking off from Polonia for Jakarta. This accident killed the incumbent North Sumatran governor at that time Tengku Rizal Nurdin and his predecessor Raja Inal Siregar, who died a day later. This accident also involved ground casualties with at least 50 casualties, as the airport is very close to overcrowded residential areas and the runway was only 3,000 metres (9,843 ft), which although considered long for European standards, is short for Indonesian standards due to it being at a lower latitude from the equator, meaning it is warmer and as a result the air is thinner, which ultimately means that longer runway distances are needed.

All 1,365 hectares (3,370 acres) of land was acquired between 1995 and 1997 and with the certificate Exploitation Rights (Hak Pengelolaaan) No. 1 on 29 November 1999 and 100% of the land belonged to PT Angkasa Pura II. Between 1999 and 2006, some people used parts of the land illegally as agricultural land and PT Angkasa Pura II (AP II) offered them monetary compensation to move elsewhere. Construction resumed on 29 June 2006, shortly before the first anniversary of the crash of Mandala Airlines Flight 091. Jusuf Kalla, vice President of Indonesia at the time, laid the first cornerstone. This marked the construction of Kualanamu after several years with no progress. Computer renderings showing a T-shape design were posted on the company's website. A visualization of the airport is also released. It was then predicted that the airport would be completed by 2010. With land acquisition as the biggest hurdle for this project, the airport's opening was delayed until 2013 due to lack of local government awareness. On 22 July, a trailer for the airport was released.

=== Soft opening ===
A soft opening to the public was done on 25 July 2013. The airport's first commercial departure was a domestic Garuda Indonesia GA181 ferry flight from Soekarno–Hatta International Airport Terminal 3 touching down at approximately 05:00 WIB.

=== Grand opening ===
The airport was officially opened by President of the Republic of Indonesia Susilo Bambang Yudhoyono, which was marked by the signing of the stone inscription plaque on 27 March 2014.

== Facilities and infrastructure ==
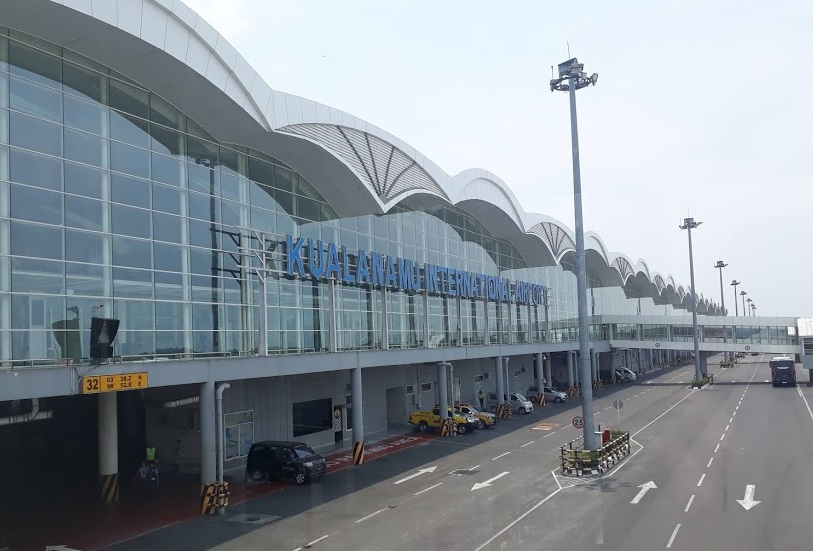
The terminal exterior design, as seen from the apron

The airport is Indonesia's third largest, after Soekarno–Hatta International Airport and the new Kertajati International Airport, with a 224,298-square-metre (2,414,320 sq ft) passenger terminal and will eventually have a capacity of 22 million passengers (2030). Kualanamu Airport has an automatic baggage handling system, thus becoming the first airport in Indonesia which does not need baggage porters.

The airport is equipped with a single 3,750-by-60-metre (12,303 ft × 197 ft) runway, and a 3,750-and-2,000-metre-long (12,303 and 6,562 ft) parallel taxiway capable of accommodating wide-body aircraft, including category – F jets such as the Airbus A380, Boeing 747-8, and Antonov 225. It also includes an apron area measuring 664 square metres (7,150 sq ft) capable of handling 33 aircraft. It also has a 13,000-square-metre (140,000 sq ft) cargo area that can handle 3 carriers with 65,000 tonnes/annum and 50,820-square-metre (547,000 sq ft) parking capacity with 405 taxis, 55 busses, and 908 cars. It covers 1,365 hectares (3,370 acres) of land, 20 kilometres (12 mi) northeast of Polonia Airport, 3 kilometres (1.9 mi) from the sea, and on a site of area 6.5 by 2.1 kilometres (4.0 mi × 1.3 mi). Phase 1 of the new airport has a capacity to serve 8 million passengers annually, but at early 2014 has served 8.3 million passengers annualized. Phase 2 starts construction in mid-2015 to serve 25 million passengers. Phase III expansion of the airport includes expansion of the runway to allow the airport to accommodate the Airbus A380, and expansion of cargo area to 24,715 square metres (266,030 sq ft) from 13,450 square metres (144,800 sq ft) at present, and expansion of passenger terminal to 224,256 square metres (2,413,870 sq ft) to increase the capacity from 9 million passengers to 17 million passengers annually, which starts in 2018. AP II also plans to develop a 200-hectare (490-acre) plot of land for commercial area outside the passenger terminal. The commercial area is built with an "airport city" concept with 3, 4 and 5 star hotels, a hypermarket, office building, hospital and movie theater.

As of 2025, the ILS system in used is ILS CAT I for both Runway 05 and 23. Arrivals and departures are usually directed to Runway 23 while Runway 05 will be used depending on wind direction.

=== Airport hotel ===
The airport has three hotels: Horison Sky (rebranded as Anara Sky), Wing Hotel and Crew Hotel.

== Operations ==
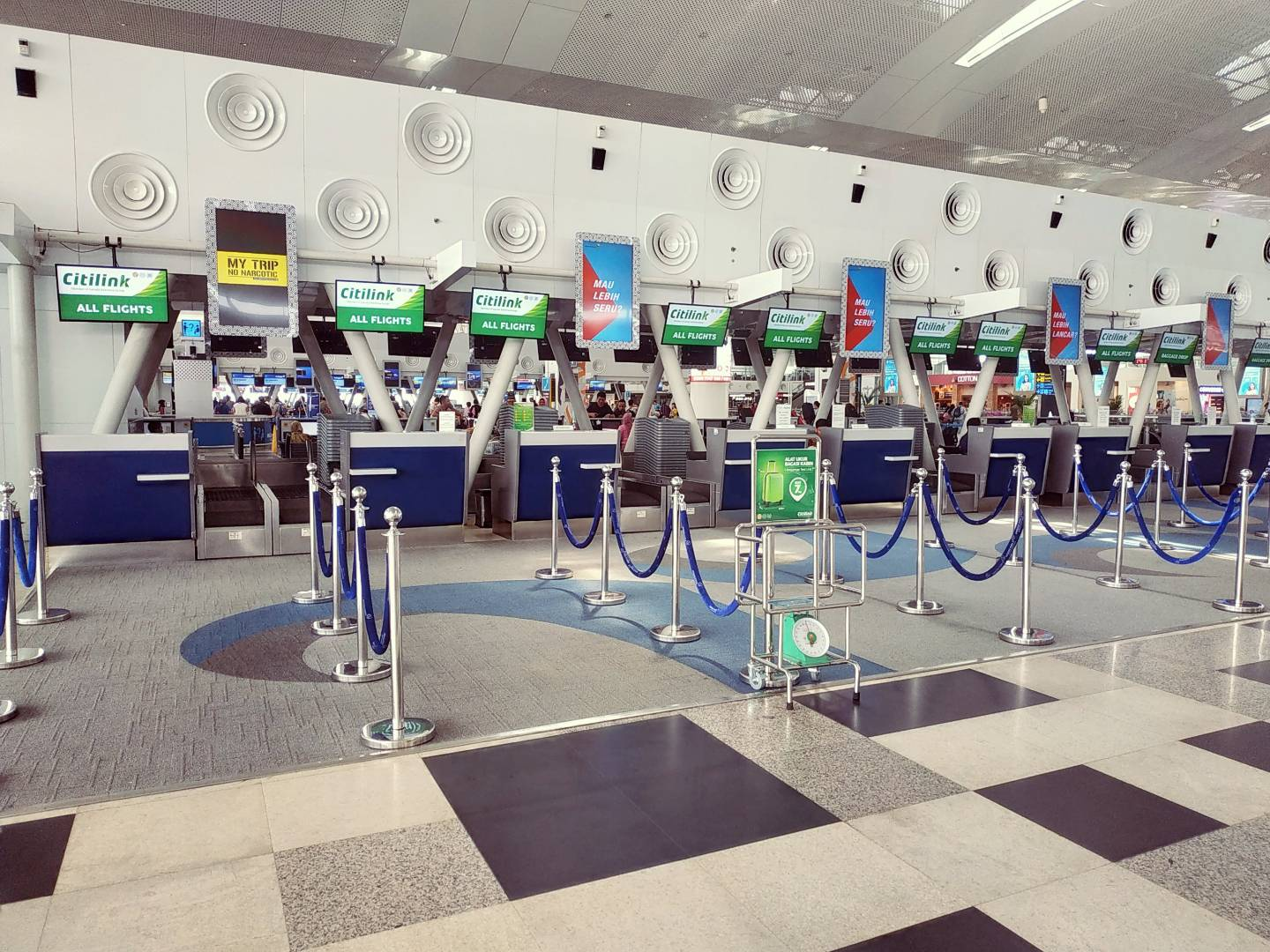
Citilink check-in counters at the airport

Airside facilities are controlled by the Indonesian government, while landside facilities would be owned by a joint venture with PT Angkasa Pura II, which is expected to provide $350 million as an initial investment in return for a 30-year lease, after which ownership would revert to PT Angkasa Pura II. The airport will be linked to the city of Medan by a $10.7 million railway project. An 18-kilometre (11 mi) highway is under construction improving the airport's road connection to the city of Medan. It will cost $1.5 billion and will have four interchanges, four underpasses, seven flyovers, and three toll gates.

The airport is the first in Indonesia with a publicly accessible check-in area (other Indonesian airports restrict access to ticket holders with security at the gate), as in a much larger and more spacious check-in area than the existing airport. The airport is designed by Wiratman & Associates, who had also designed several other new airports and office buildings in Indonesia. Computer renderings showing a T-shape design were posted on the company's website. Another rendering and masterplan can be found in Angkasa Pura II website. A visualization of the airport was also released. The Indonesian government hopes that Kualanamu "can compete with Singapore Changi, Bangkok Suvarnabhumi, etc.," and make Kualanamu "an international hub."

== Airlines and destinations ==
=== Passenger ===
Airlines	Destinations
AirAsia	Kuala Lumpur–International
Batik Air	Jakarta–Soekarno-Hatta, Jambi, Singapore
Batik Air Malaysia	Kuala Lumpur–International, Penang (resumes 1 December 2026)
Citilink	Bandung–Husein Sastranegara, Batam, Jakarta–Halim Perdanakusuma, Jakarta–Soekarno-Hatta
Donghai Airlines	Charter: Shenzhen
Garuda Indonesia	Jakarta–Soekarno-Hatta; Seasonal: Jeddah, Medina
Indonesia AirAsia	Bangkok–Don Mueang, Kuala Lumpur–International, Penang
Lion Air	Balikpapan, (Note: Balikpapan is the continuation of Batam flight, operating under the same flight number.) Batam, Jakarta–Soekarno-Hatta, Pekanbaru, Penang, Pontianak, (Note: Pontianak is the continuation of Batam flight, operating under the same flight number.) Surabaya, (Note: Surabaya is the continuation of Batam flight, operating under the same flight number.) Yogyakarta–International; Seasonal: Jeddah, Medina
Malaysia Airlines	Kuala Lumpur–International
Pelita Air	Jakarta–Soekarno-Hatta
SalamAir	Muscat
Saudia	Seasonal: Jeddah, Medina
Scoot	Singapore
Singapore Airlines	Singapore
Super Air Jet	Banda Aceh, Bandung–Husein Sastranegara, Denpasar, (Note: Denpasar is the continuation of Bandung–Husein Sastranegara flight, operating under the same flight number.) Jakarta–Soekarno-Hatta, Padang, Palembang, Pekanbaru, Surabaya
Susi Air	Blangkejeren, Panyabungan, Sinabang, Singkil, Takengon
Wings Air	Banda Aceh, Gunungsitoli, Lhokseumawe, Sibolga, Sinabang, Takengon

=== Cargo ===
Airlines	Destinations
My Indo Airlines	Jakarta–Soekarno-Hatta, Penang
Rimbun Air	Jakarta–Soekarno-Hatta

== Statistics ==
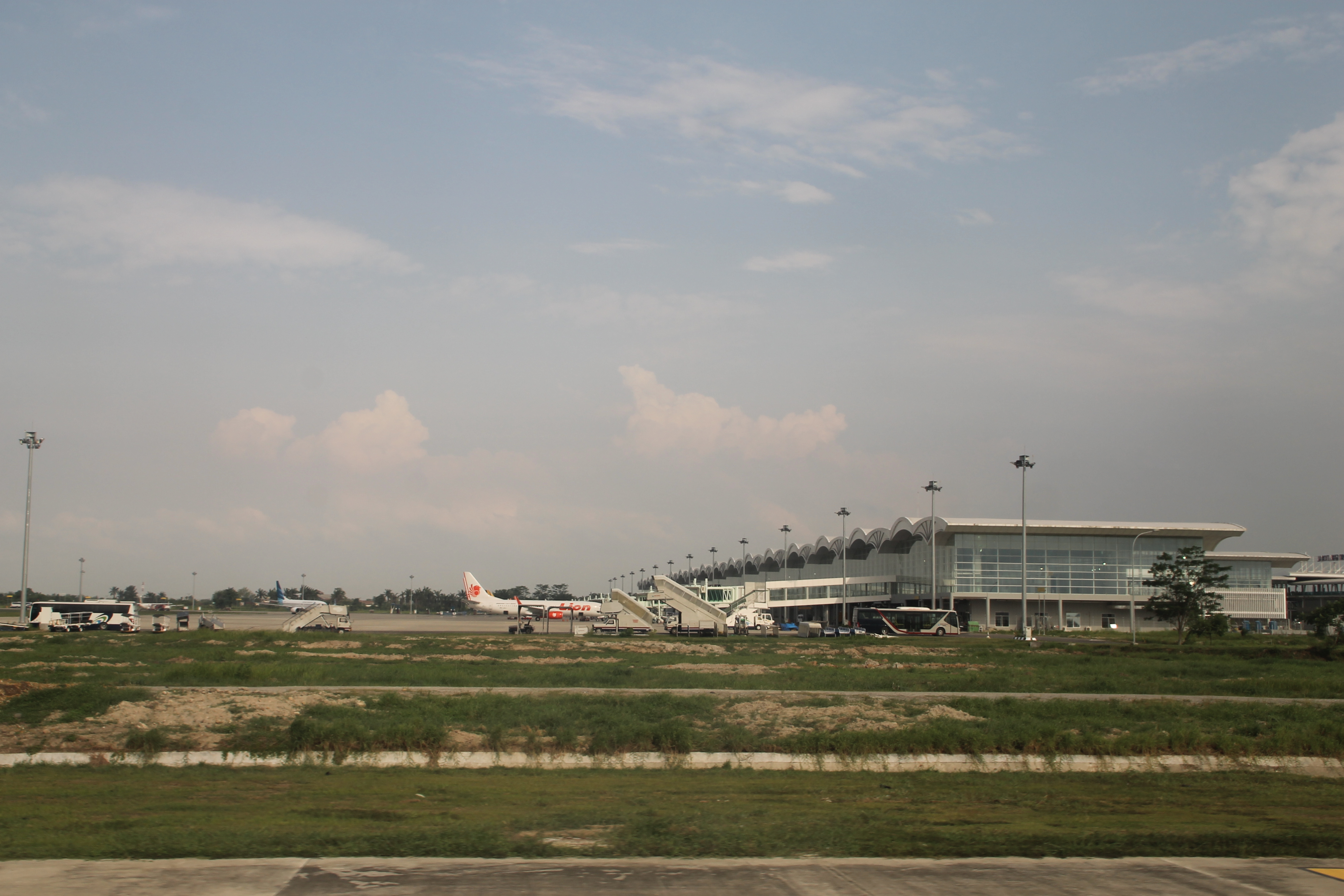
Apron view of Kualanamu International Airport

Annual passenger numbers and aircraft statistics
Year	Passengers handled	Passenger % change	Cargo (tonnes)	Cargo % change	Aircraft movements	Aircraft % change
2006	4,446,159	Steady	31,392	Steady	50,181	Steady
2007	5,038,475	▲13.3	33,158	▲5.6	53,103	▲5.8
2008	4,976,920	▼1.2	38,773	▲16.9	52,747	▼0.7
2009	4,956,341	▼0.4	34,837	▼10.2	50,083	▼5.1
2010	6,176,194	▲24.6	35,801	▲2.8	57,276	▲14.4
2011	7,166,945	▲16.0	47,258	▲32.0	61,718	▲7.8
2012	7,191,914	▲0.3	42,794	▼9.4	65,970	▲6.9
2013	8,358,705	▲16.2	53,423	▲24.8	70,251	▲6.5
2014	8,059,795	▼3.6	42,371	▼20.7	63,693	▼9.3
2015	8,004,791	▼0.7	41,629	▼1.8	63,549	▲0.2
2016	8,959,483	▲11.9	43,692	▲5.0	69,561	▲9.5
2017	9,003,799	▲0.5	53,494	▲22.4	81,203	▲16.7
2018	10,452,205	▲16.1	55,664	▲4.1	80,354	▼1.0
2019	8,064,375	▼22.8	52,721	▼5.3	64,691	▼19.5
2020	3,379,922	▼58.1	50,209	▼4.8	35,930	▼44.5
2021	3,632,627	▲7.5	65,606	▲30.7	64,656	▲79.9
2022	5,834,281	▲60.6	50,693	▼22.7	49,903	▼22.8
2023	7,388,760	▲26.6	48,167	▼5.0	58,918	▲18.1
2024	7,000,127	▼5.3	59,260	▲23.0	53,224	▼9.7
^{Source: DGCA, BPS}

Notes: Data prior to 2013 are derived from records of Polonia International Airport.

== Ground transportation ==
=== Rail transport ===
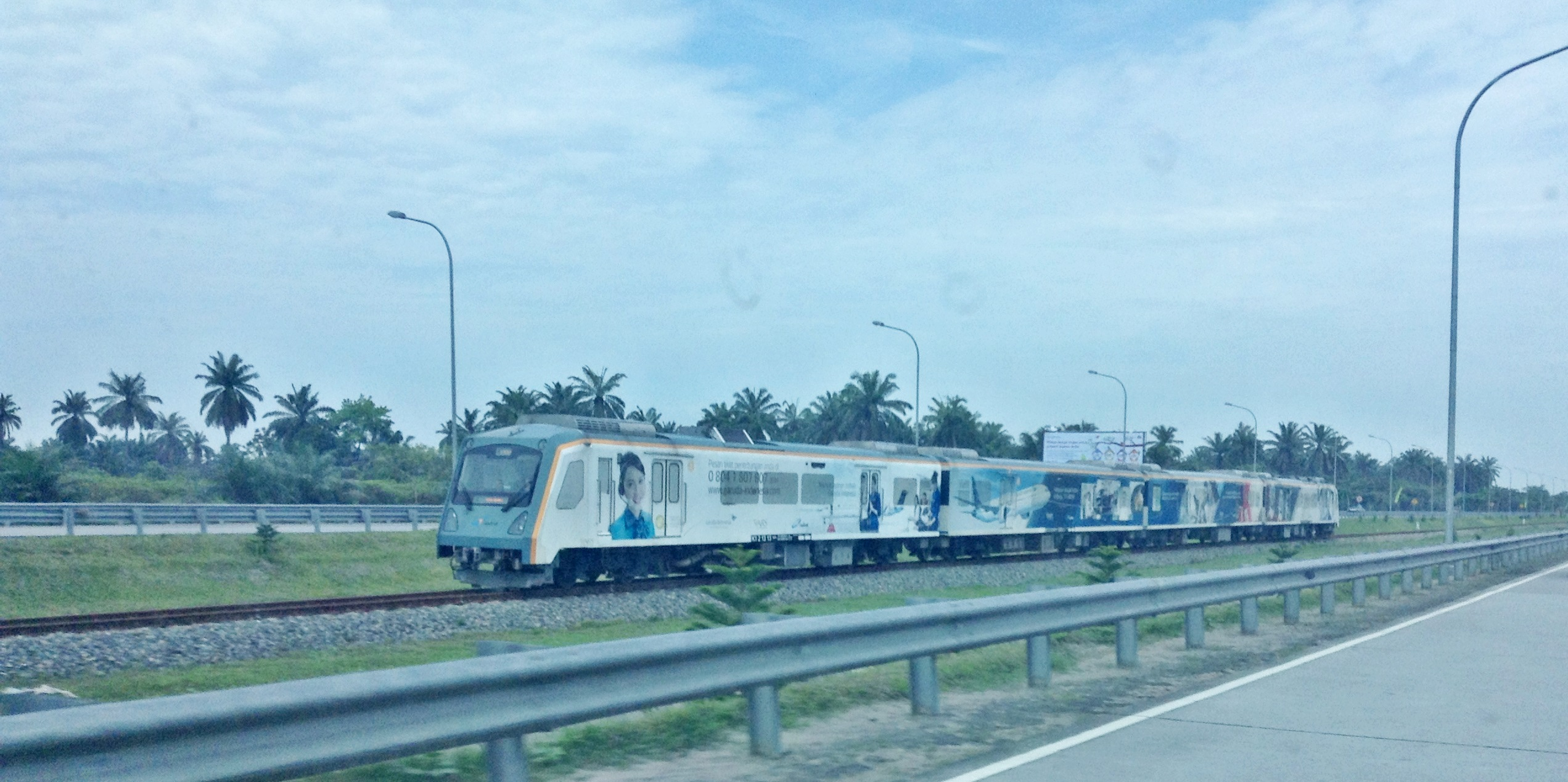
One of the two Kualanamu ARS (Airport Railink Service) trains

Train services are operated by Railink, a joint venture between Angkasa Pura II and Indonesian Railway. It is the first integrated airport rail link in Indonesia. The trains were made in South Korea.

The route runs from Medan railway station beside the Merdeka Square to Kualanamu International Airport railway station, providing the fastest way to reach the airport, taking 30 minutes, and the return taking 30 to 47 minutes. In May 2014, a double-tracking from Medan to the airport began. This will cut time travel by at least 10 minutes.

On 28 September 2022, Railink launched new stop-over at Bandar Khalipah Station in Deli Serdang. Estimated travel time from this station will take 20 minutes to reach the airport. Passengers can also take up journey from Bandar Khalipah Station to Medan railway station with estimated travel time 10 minutes. Online bookings were made available directly from its website.

=== Roads ===
The airport is connected by the Medan–Kualanamu–Tebing Tinggi Toll Road, an expressway specifically made to connect the airport and city Tebing Tinggi and other parts of eastern North Sumatra, which is also part of the Trans-Sumatra Toll Road network. An arterial road connecting the city of Medan and the airport were also built as an alternative.

=== Bus ===
A state-owned bus company, Perum DAMRI, operates services to the airport. The DAMRI bus has only two bus shelters in Medan, on Gatot Subroto Road next to Plaza Medan Fair and at the Amplas bus terminal. It takes about 60 to 90 minutes to reach the airport (depending on departure point and traffic). Two-hour trips from the more central Plaza Medan Fair are not uncommon. The fare is cheaper than a train ride to the city. There is also a cab service which carries passengers to several destinations. Tour companies Paradep and Travel Nice Trans links the airport to Parapat via Pematangsiantar that is a main gateway to reach some popular destinations like Samosir Island and Lake Toba.

Airport shuttle bus

Operator	Destination	City
Damri	Amplas Bus Terminal	Medan
Damri	Plaza Medan Fair	Medan
Damri	Ajibata Ferry Port	Parapat
Damri	Tigaras Harbor	Tigaras
ALS	Gagak Hitam (Ringroad)	Medan
ALS	Binjai Super Mall	Binjai
Almasar	Kabanjahe	Kabanjahe
Almasar	Pangururan	Pangururan
Almasar	Tanjung Balai	Tanjung Balai
Paradep	Sutomo St	Pematang Siantar
Nice Trans	Millenium ICT Center	Medan
Sampri	Sidikalang	Sidikalang

=== Taxis ===
Taxi costs about twice that of train tickets. Taxi operators that bring passengers to the airport are Blue Bird, KARSA, MATRA, and Nice Trans. Grab and Go-Jek operate inside the airport.

== Accolades ==
In June 2015, Kualanamu received a certificate from Skytrax as a "4-Star Airport", the first Indonesian airport to receive such title. On 16 June 2016, the airport won the Diamond Award for the Service Quality Award under the 'International Airports' category by Angkasa Pura II. In August 2019, the custom system of the airport received an accolade from the 2018 Innovation Competition by the Ministry of Finance, given by the Directorate General of Customs and Excise, along with Soekarno-Hatta International Airport.

== See also ==
- Aviation in Indonesia
- List of airports in Indonesia
- List of airports by ICAO code: W
