= Maimun Saleh Airport =

Airport in Sabang, Indonesia

Maimun Saleh Airport Bandar Udara Maimun Saleh
- IATA: SBG; ICAO: WITN

Summary
- Airport type: Military, public
- Owner: Government of Indonesia
- Operator: Ministry of Transportation
- Serves: Sabang
- Location: Sabang, Aceh, Indonesia
- Time zone: WIB (UTC+07:00)
- Elevation AMSL: 433 ft / 132 m
- Coordinates: 5°52′29″N 95°20′24″E
- Website: sbg.informasibandara.org

Maps
- Sumatra region in Indonesia

- Location in Northern Sumatra Location in Indonesia Location in Bay of Bengal

Runways
Direction	Length		Surface
Direction	ft	m	Surface
10/28	5,906	1,800	Asphalt
- Sources: DGCA

Maimun Saleh Airport (IATA: SBG, ICAO: WITN) is a small domestic airport with a runway length of 1,844 m (6,050 ft) and altitude of 120 m (390 ft) in Sabang, Pulau Weh, Indonesia. It is situated on the island right above the northern tip of Sumatra in the Andaman Sea. It is part of the Sabang city in Aceh province. This airport was named after Indonesian Air Force pilot Maimun Saleh, who died in a plane crash at Bogor in August 1952. It is considered to be Indonesia's westernmost and northernmost airport.

This airport is part of Indonesian Navy facility such as El Tari Airport. The nearest airport to Sabang is Sultan Iskandarmuda Airport, which is located in nearby Banda Aceh.

== Airlines and destinations ==
In 2024, Susi Air opened a weekly pioneer route to Banda Aceh, it operated 2 times from Tuesday and Friday

Airlines	Destinations
Susi Air	Banda Aceh
