= Soekarno–Hatta International Airport =

Airport serving Jakarta, Indonesia

Soekarno–Hatta International Airport Bandar Udara Internasional Soekarno–Hatta
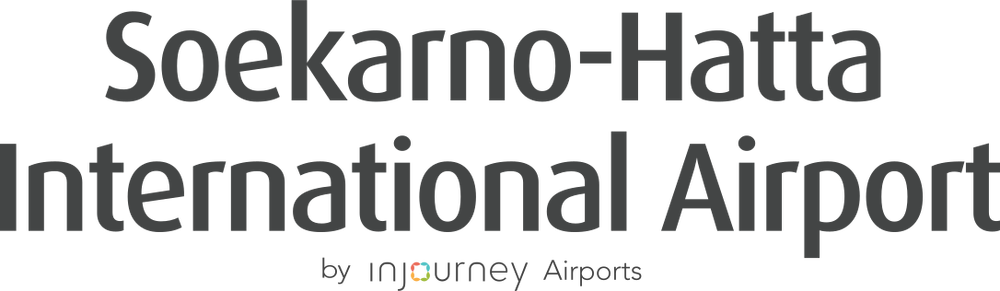

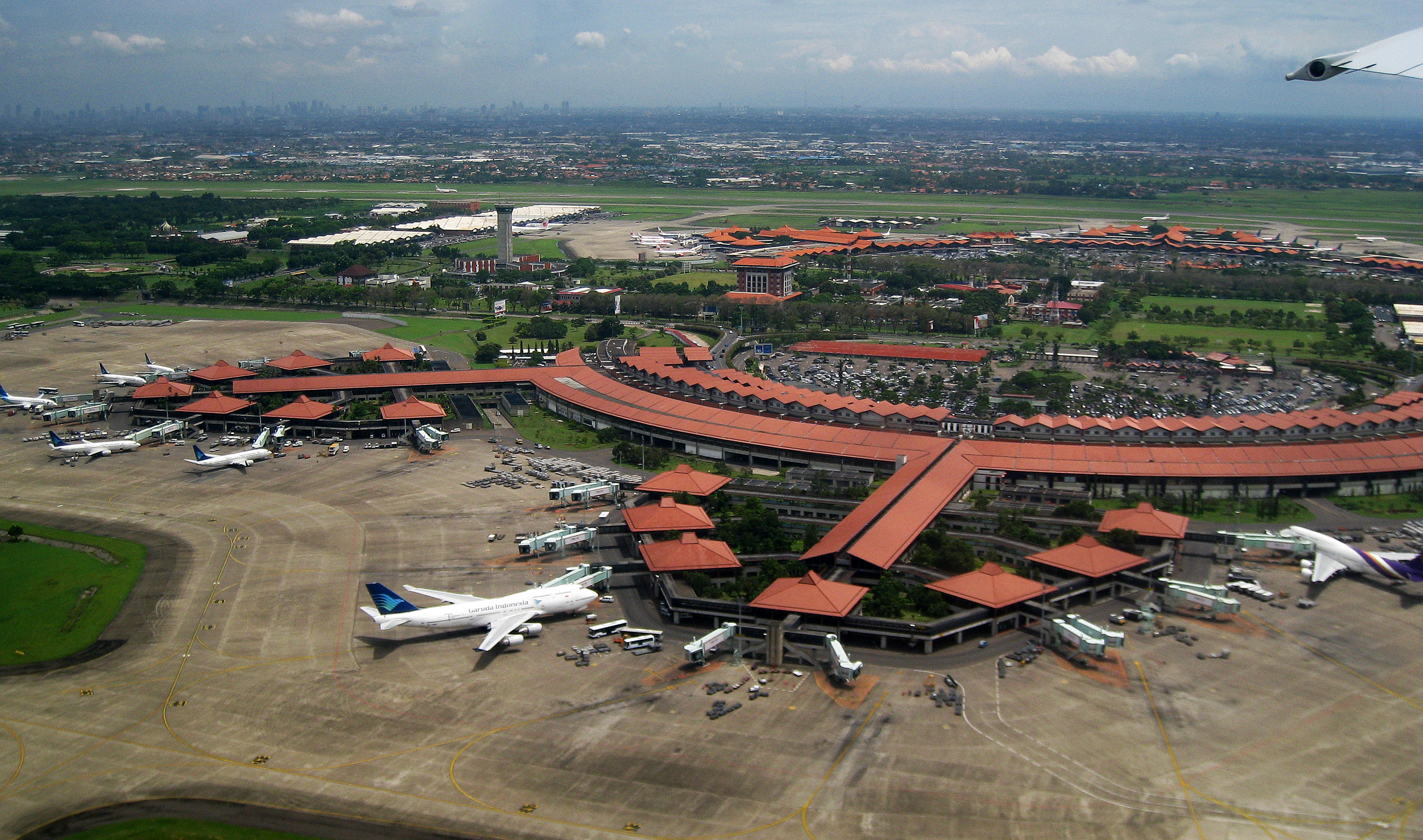
- IATA: CGK; ICAO: WIII; WMO: 96749

Summary
- Airport type: Public
- Owner: Government of Indonesia
- Operator: InJourney Airports
- Serves: Jakarta metropolitan area
- Location: Tangerang, Banten, Indonesia
- Opened: 1 May 1985 (41 years ago)
- Hub for: Batik Air; Citilink; Garuda Indonesia; Indonesia AirAsia; Lion Air; NAM Air; Pelita Air; Sriwijaya Air; Super Air Jet; TransNusa
- Time zone: WIB (UTC+07:00)
- Elevation AMSL: 32 ft (9.8 m)
- Coordinates: 6°07′32″S 106°39′21″E
- Website: soekarnohatta.injourneyairports.id

Map
- Location in Tangerang Location in Java Location in Indonesia

Runways
Direction	Length		Surface
Direction	m	ft	Surface
07R/25L	3,660	12,008	Asphalt
07L/25R	3,600	11,811	Asphalt
06/24	3,000	9,843	Asphalt

Statistics (2023)
- Passengers: 49,080,532
- Aircraft movements: 348,088
- Cargo (metric tonnes): 578,621
- Economic & social impact: $5.1 billion & 705 thousand
- Source: List of the busiest airports in Indonesia, Passenger and aircraft movements from ACI; Cargo from Angkasa Pura II Airports Company

Airport layout

Soekarno–Hatta International Airport (IATA: CGK, ICAO: WIII), also sometimes abbreviated as SHIA or Soetta, and formerly named Jakarta Cengkareng Airport due to its location in Cengkareng district, (Note: Hence the IATA code CGK comes from "Cengkareng") is the primary airport serving the Jakarta metropolitan area on the island of Java in Indonesia. Named after the first president and vice president of Indonesia, Sukarno (1901–1970) and Mohammad Hatta (1902–1980), the airport is located at Benda, Tangerang and Cengkareng, West Jakarta, which is about 20 km northwest of Central Jakarta. Soekarno–Hatta International Airport is the busiest and largest airport in Indonesia, serving as the country's primary international gateway. The airport functions as a major hub for Indonesian airlines, including Garuda Indonesia, Citilink, Batik Air, Lion Air, Super Air Jet, Indonesia AirAsia, Pelita Air, and TransNusa. It serves domestic routes to major cities across Indonesia, as well as international destinations throughout the Asia-Pacific region, Europe, the Middle East, and Africa. In 2025, the airport handled 54.95 million passengers, ranking as the 31st busiest airport in the world and the fourth busiest in Southeast Asia.

== History ==
=== Background ===
Prior to the construction of Soekarno–Hatta International Airport, Jakarta was served by two airports: Kemayoran Airport, which functioned as the city's main commercial passenger airport, and Halim Perdanakusuma Airport, which served as a base for the Indonesian Air Force and handled non-scheduled passenger flights.

By the late 1960s, Kemayoran Airport, Jakarta's first airport and the city's primary gateway since the Dutch colonial era, was increasingly regarded as inadequate for future expansion. Its close proximity to Halim Perdanakusuma Airport, combined with its location in the heart of the city amid densely populated residential areas, severely limited opportunities for further development. Civilian airspace around Jakarta also became increasingly restricted, while air traffic grew rapidly, creating mounting challenges for international aviation operations. As a result, the airport began suffering from chronic overcapacity due to the lack of available space for expansion. These concerns were formally raised during a senior communications officers’ meeting in Bangkok in 1969.

In the early 1970s, with assistance from USAID, eight potential sites for a new international airport were evaluated: Kemayoran, Malaka, Babakan, Jonggol, Halim, Curug, South Tangerang, and North Tangerang. Ultimately, the North Tangerang site was selected, while Jonggol was identified as a possible alternative airfield for future use. As an interim measure, the Indonesian government upgraded Halim Perdanakusuma Airport in 1974 to accommodate international passenger services. Kemayoran Airport was eventually closed in 1985, and the former airport site was later redeveloped for commercial and residential purposes.

Between 1974 and 1975, a Canadian consortium, consisting of Aviation Planning Services Ltd., ACRESS International Ltd., and Searle Wilbee Rowland (SWR), won a bid for the new airport feasibility project. The feasibility study started on 20 February 1974, costing 1 million Canadian dollars. The one-year project proceeded with an Indonesian partner represented by PT Konavi. By the end of March 1975, the study revealed a plan to build three inline runways, three international terminal buildings, three domestic buildings, and one for Hajj flights. Three stores for the domestic terminals would be built between 1975 and 1981 at a cost of US$465 million and one domestic terminals including an apron from 1982 to 1985 for US$126 million. A new terminal project, named the Jakarta International Airport Cengkareng, began.

On 20 May 1980, a four-year contract was signed. Sainraptet Brice, SAE, Colas together with PT. Waskita Karya was chosen to be the developer. Ir. Karno Barkah was appointed the project director, responsible for the airport's construction.

=== Construction and inauguration ===
Construction of the airport was carried out in two phases: Phase I (1975–1980) and Phase II (1980–1985). The first passenger terminal was completed in 1980. Soekarno–Hatta International Airport commenced domestic operations on 1 May 1985, replacing the overcrowded Kemayoran Airport, and was officially inaugurated by then-President Soeharto. The airport was expanded in 1991 with the construction of a new international terminal and a second runway, enabling it to take over international operations from Halim Perdanakusuma International Airport. Halim subsequently continued serving domestic, charter, VIP, and private flights, before later reopening as a secondary commercial airport in 2014 for domestic services to help relieve congestion at Soekarno–Hatta International Airport, which has been operating beyond its intended capacity.

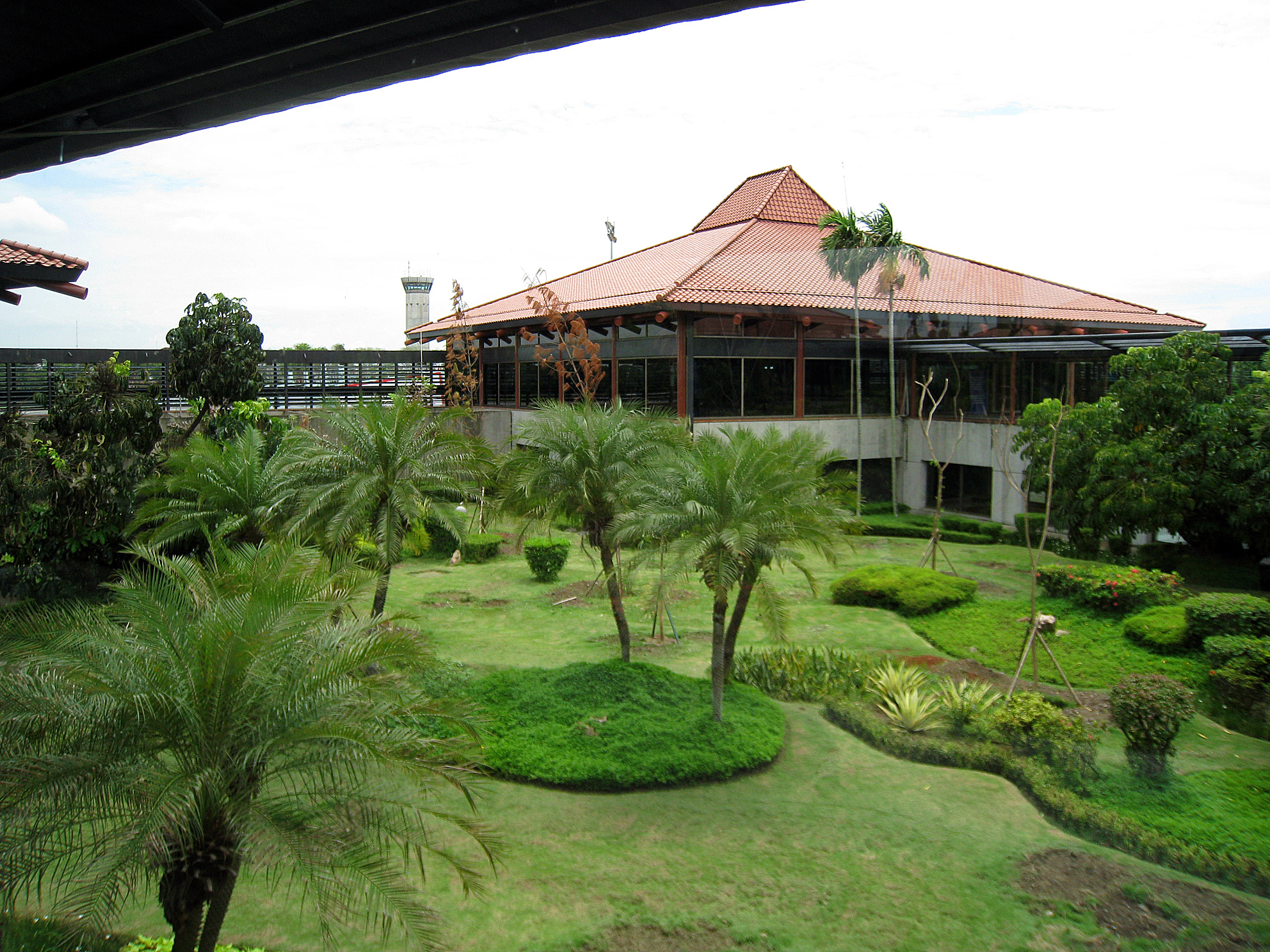
Tropical gardens fill the spaces between Javanese-styled pendopo waiting and boarding pavilions

Terminals 1 and 2 of Soekarno–Hatta International Airport were designed by French architect Paul Andreu, who also designed Paris Charles de Gaulle Airport. One of the airport's defining features is the incorporation of local Indonesian architectural elements into its design, complemented by tropical gardens situated between the waiting lounges. These distinctive characteristics earned the airport the 1995 Aga Khan Award for Architecture. The airport's runways are aligned northeast–southwest and consist of two parallel runways, with one located on the northern side and one on the southern side. The terminal complex follows a spanning-fan layout, in which the main terminal buildings are connected to a series of waiting and boarding pavilions through corridors. These pavilions are linked to aircraft via boarding bridges. Terminal 1 is located on the southern side of the airport, while Terminals 2 is situated on the northern side. The airport's architectural concept has been described as a “garden within the airport” or an “airport in the garden”, reflecting the extensive use of tropical plants and landscaped gardens throughout the terminal complex. The boarding pavilions incorporate elements of traditional Indonesian vernacular architecture, particularly the Javanese pendopo and joglo stepped-roof styles. Interior decorations further showcase Indonesia's cultural diversity through ethnic motifs and wooden carvings inspired by the artistic traditions of Java, Bali, Sumatra, the Dayak regions of Kalimantan, Toraja, and Papua. Another notable feature is the use of the kala-makara motif—depicting a giant head and a mythical fish-elephant creature—on stair railings, doors, and gates, inspired by ancient Indonesian temples such as Borobudur.

=== Expansion ===
Terminal 3, however, has a different architectural style—unlike the ethnic-inspired Indonesian vernacular architecture of terminals 1 and 2, terminal 3 uses the contemporary modern style of large glass windows with metal frames and columns.

=== Project phases ===
Phases of Soekarno–Hatta International Airport project
Phase	Year	Description	Status
Phase 1	1 May 1985	Opening of Terminal 1 with a capacity of 9 million passengers per annum	Completed
Phase 2	11 May 1991	Opening of Terminal 2 with a capacity of 18 million passengers per annum	Completed
Phase 3	15 April 2009	Construction of Terminal 3 phase 1 with a capacity of 22 million passengers per annum	Completed
Phase 3	15 April 2009	Fully built new freight terminal (on northwest section)	Pending
Phase 4	9 August 2016	Completion of Terminal 3 with a capacity of 43 million passengers per annum	Completed
Phase 4	9 August 2016	Construction of airport railway	Completed
Phase 4	9 August 2016	Construction of third runway	Completed
Phase 4	9 August 2016	Construction of east-cross taxiway	Completed
Phase 5	2022	Refurbishment of Terminal 1 & Terminal 2 to increase capacity to 61 million passengers per annum	In progress

== Facilities and development ==
=== Terminals ===
There are three main terminal buildings: Terminal 1, Terminal 2 and Terminal 3. The airport also has a dedicated freight terminal for domestic and international cargo.

==== Terminal 1 ====
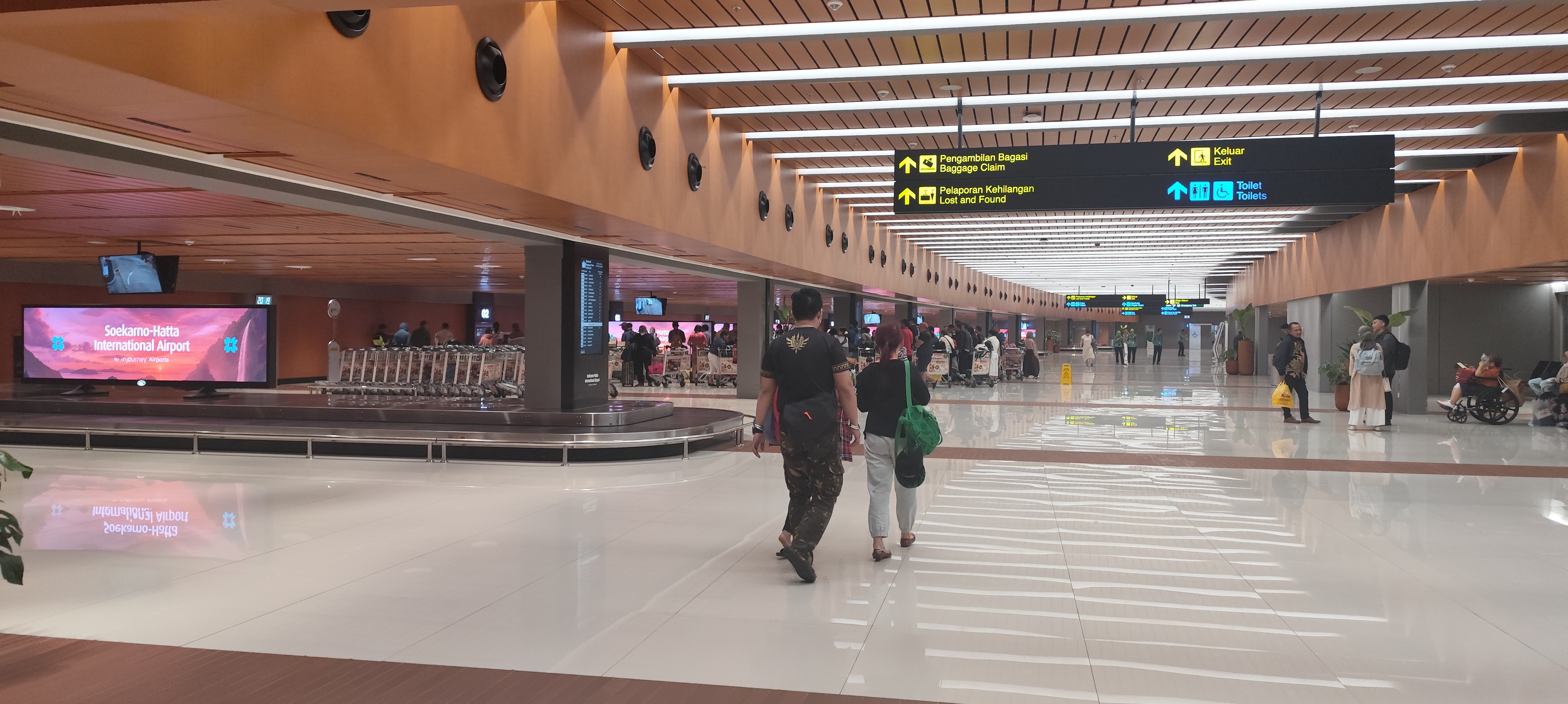
Arrival area at Terminal 1C

Terminal 1 is the first terminal built and was opened in 1985. It is located on the southern side of the airport, opposite Terminal 2. Terminal 1 has three sub-terminals, each equipped with 25 check-in counters, 23 aerobridges, five baggage carousels, and seven gates. It can handle 9 million passengers per annum.

The gates in Terminal 1 have a prefix of A, B or C. The gates are A1–A7, B1–B7 and C1–C7. In the latest master plan, Terminal 1 will have its capacity increased to 18 million passengers per annum.

Terminal 1B and Terminal 1C underwent renovations in the early 2020s. The project is expected to double the number of passengers at both terminals to 36 million a year. Terminal 1B was reopened on 15 March 2025, followed by Terminal 1C on 12 November of the same year.

==== Terminal 2 ====
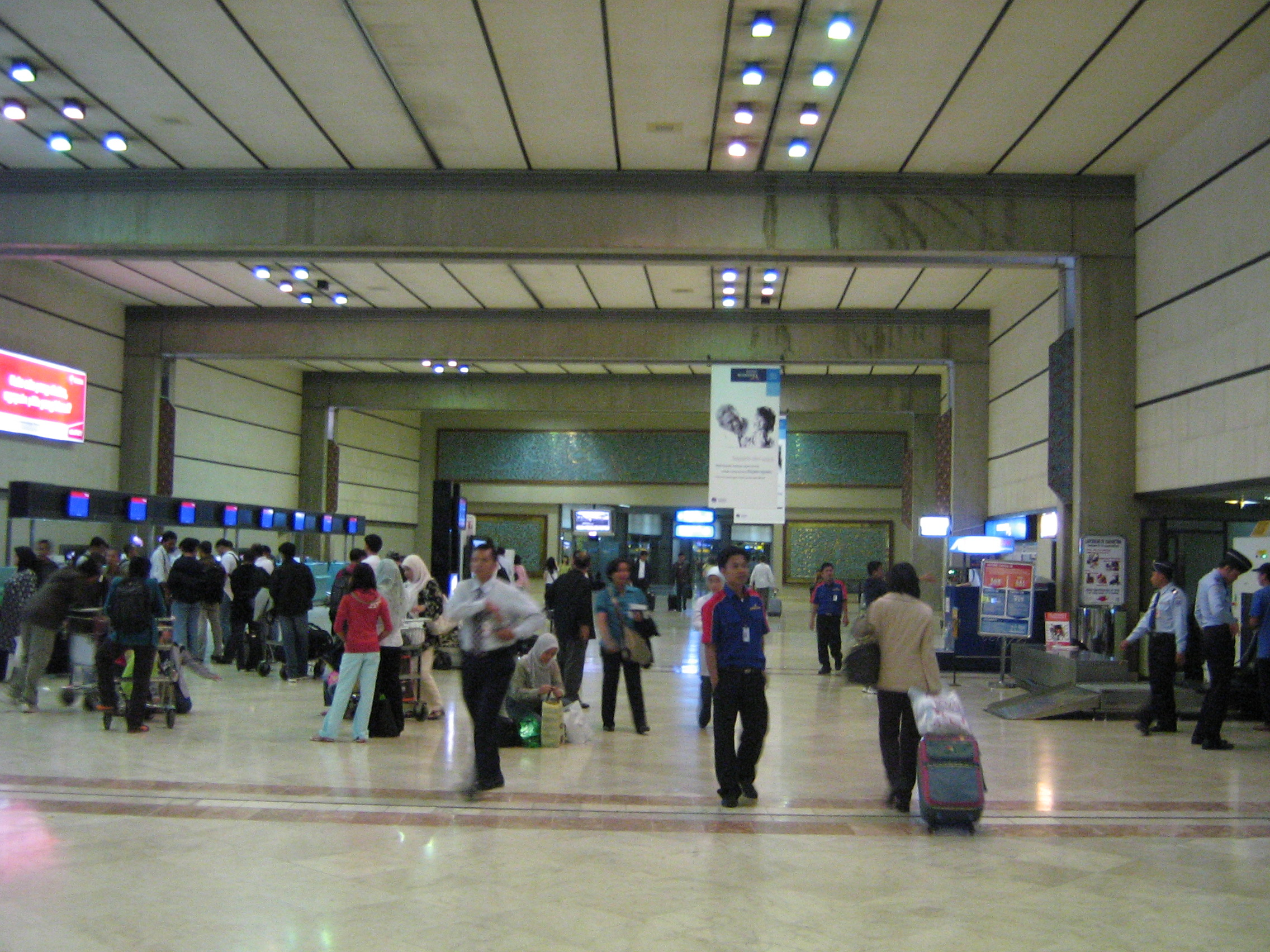
Check-in area at Terminal 2

Terminal 2 is the second terminal built and was opened in 1991. It is located on the north-western side of the airport, opposite Terminal 1. Like Terminal 1, it has three sub-terminals, labeled as D, E and F, each of which has seven gates, 40 aerobridges and 25 check-in counters. Terminal 2D and 2E and was converted into an international low-cost carrier terminal (LCCT) in 2019, while terminal 2F exclusively caters to hajj and umrah (minor hajj) flights since 2025.

==== Terminal 3 ====
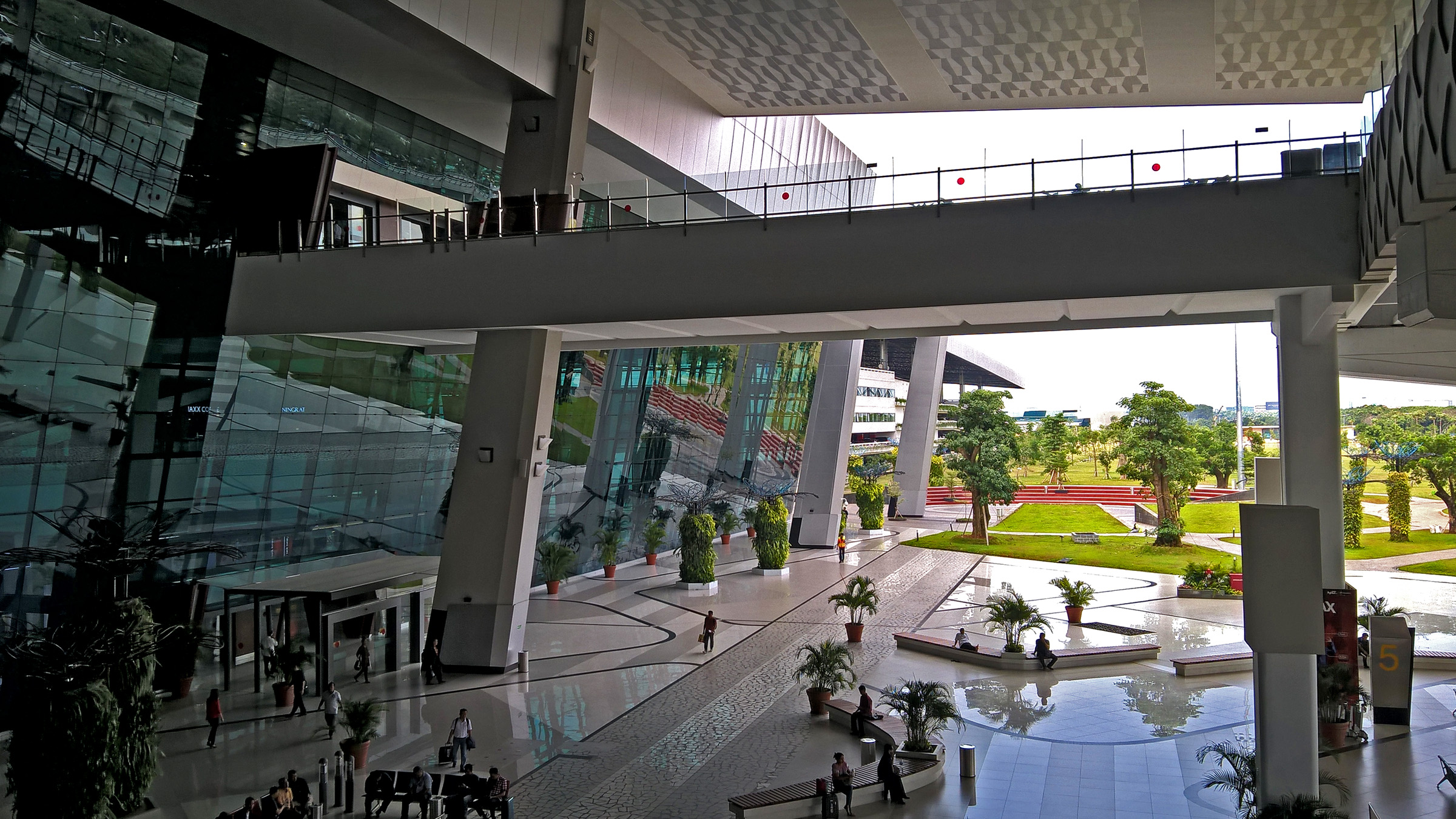
Terminal 3 exterior

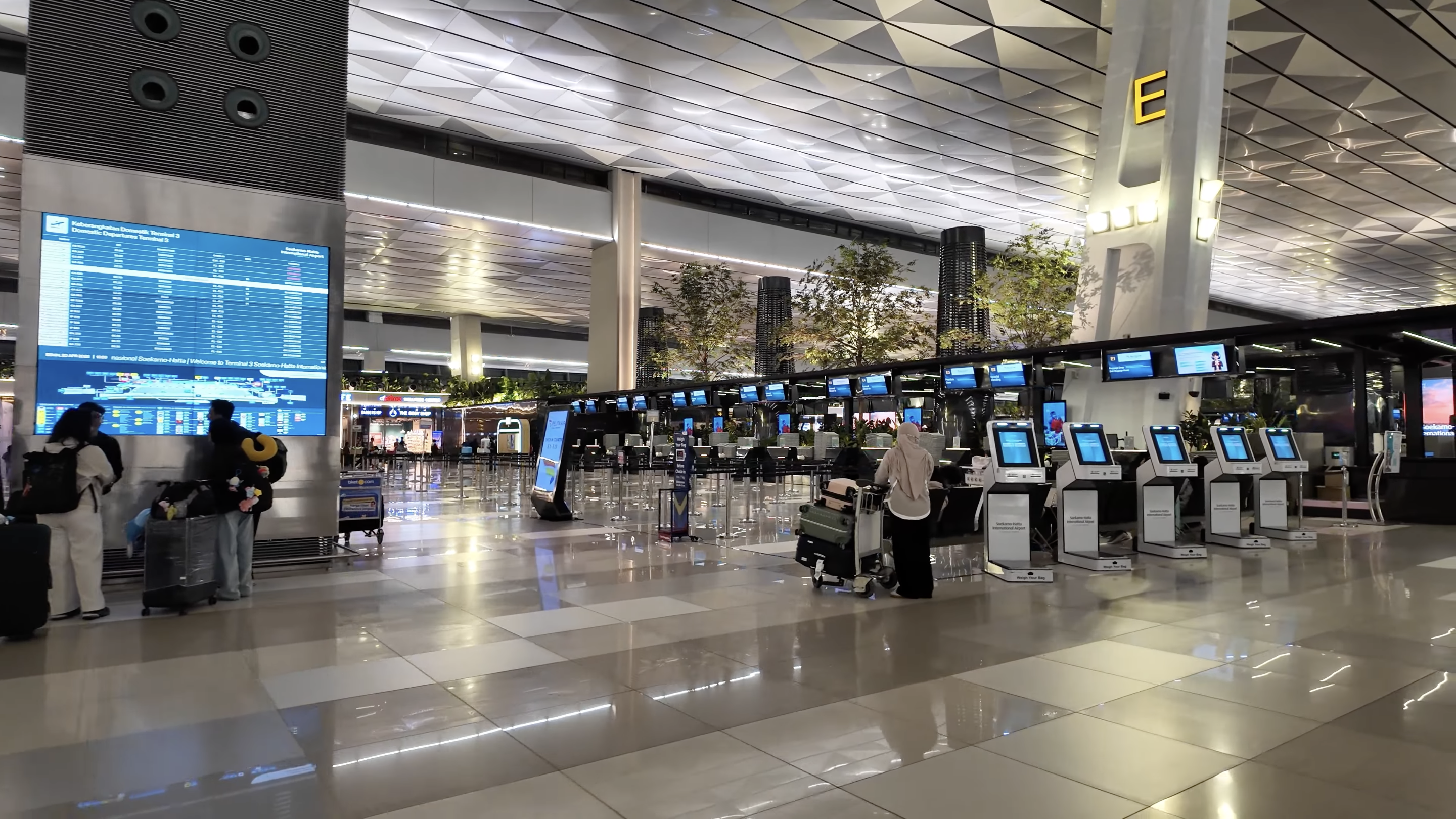
Check-in desks and self check-in machines at the departure area of Terminal 3

Terminal 3 is the airport's newest and largest terminal. The original Terminal 3 was officially opened for international flights on 15 November 2011, when all Indonesia AirAsia flights started using Terminal 3 as its new base for international, as well as domestic flights. It was built to cater to low-cost carriers. The terminal was located on the north-eastern side of the airport.

On 9 August 2016, a new passenger terminal named 'Terminal 3 Ultimate', was officially opened. The original Terminal 3 was revamped and integrated into the new Terminal 3 Ultimate, forming the current Terminal 3. It has a floor area of 422,804 m^{2} (4,551,020 sq ft) and was built to handle 25 million passengers per annum. Unlike Terminal 1 and 2, Terminal 3's architectural style is vastly different, using an eco-friendly contemporary modern design. It is equipped with 10 international gates, 18 domestic gates, 112 check-in counters, 59 aerobridges and 10 bus gates.

In 2018, the terminal's west pier (Pier 1) was extended. 8 new aerobridges were added, with 7 catering to wide-body aircraft and 1 catering to narrow-body aircraft.

Terminal 3 is equipped with BHS level 5 to detect bombs, an Airport Security System (ASS) which can control up to 600 CCTVs to detect faces who are available in the security register, an Intelligence Building Management System (IBMS) which can control uses of water and electricity (eco-green), rainwater system to produce clean water from rain, a recycled water system to produce toilet water from used toilet water, and illumination technology control to illuminate the terminal depending on the weather surrounding the terminal. Terminal 3 will be able to serve 60 airplanes from the current 40 airplanes.

=== Airport hotel ===
Soekarno–Hatta International Airport has a five-star hotel, Sheraton Jakarta Soekarno Hatta Airport. This hotel is located inside the airport complex and has 227 guest rooms. All terminals of the airport have dedicated hotel. d'primahotel is located at both Terminal 1 and Terminal 3, and Jakarta Airport Hotel is located at Terminal 2. There are other hotels located near the airport's main entrance, such as Amaris Hotel Bandara Soekarno Hatta, Fairfield by Marriott Jakarta Soekarno-Hatta Airport, Ibis Budget Jakarta Airport, Ibis Styles Jakarta Airport, Orchardz Hotel Bandara Jakarta, Swiss-Belhotel Airport Jakarta, TreePark Hotel Jakarta Airport, and Zest Airport Jakarta by Swiss-Belhotel International.

=== Other facilities ===
The airport contains the head office of Garuda Indonesia, Garuda Indonesia Management Building, located in the Garuda Indonesia City Center. Angkasa Pura II's head office is on the airport property. Sriwijaya Air has its head office at Sriwijaya Air Tower.

=== Development ===
In the first stage, Terminal 3 will be expanded. Terminal 1 and Terminal 2 will be integrated with green walls and the airport will have a convention hall, shopping center, hotel, playground, recreational facilities and parking area for 20,000 vehicles.

To anticipate a surge in passenger numbers, at least a ten percent increase each year, the government made plans to build a third runway. By May 2019 the construction progress reached 70 percent. 2500 meters of the runway began operational on 15 August 2019.

Initially, Angkasa Pura II planned for an expansion that will use about 1,000 hectares (2,500 acres) from 10 villages in the Teluk Naga and Kosambi subdistricts. The expansion plan was rejected by the Tangerang Municipal Government because the residents living around the airport would lose their jobs. The local government offered another location such as in Balaraja, but Angkasa Pura II corporate secretary said that building a new airport would not be an easy task, as it requires a thorough study. Finally, Angkasa Pura II only used 134 hectares of land and appraisal will be used to buy the land.

To accommodate 86 aircraft movements per hour from the current 72 movements per hour, since 2016 the airport authority has been developing an east cross taxiway costing Rp 1.15 trillion ($86.1 million) to connect the existing Runway 1 and Runway 2. The east cross taxiway was finished and opened in December 2019.

==== Terminal 4 ====
In 2019, Angkasa Pura II announced a plan to build Terminal 4, which would have been located on the north side of runway 1, north of Terminal 3, and east of Terminal 1. The terminal was to be built on 130 hectares of land and serve 45 million passengers annually. The terminal was to be designed in the form of an 'H' and use eco-friendly and modern design, similar to the design of Terminal 3. The terminal was originally expected to be operational by 2024, but construction never commenced. On 4 November 2024, plans for the construction of a fourth terminal were scrapped by Erick Thohir, then serving as Minister of State-Owned Enterprises, citing lower-than-projected passenger numbers and aircraft traffic movements.

== Airlines and destinations ==
=== Passenger ===
Airlines	Destinations
9 Air	Guangzhou
Air China	Beijing–Capital, Chengdu–Tianfu
AirAsia	Kota Bharu, Kuala Lumpur–International, Penang
AirBorneo	Kuching
All Nippon Airways	Tokyo–Haneda, Tokyo–Narita
Asiana Airlines	Seoul–Incheon (ends 17 December 2026)
Batik Air	Ambon, Balikpapan, Banda Aceh, Bandar Lampung, Bangkok–Don Mueang, Banjarmasin, Batam, Bengkulu, Denpasar, Gorontalo, Jambi, Jayapura, Kendari, Kuala Lumpur–International, Kupang, Labuan Bajo, Lombok, Lubuklinggau, Makassar, Malang, Manado, Medan, Muara Bungo, Padang, Palangkaraya, Palembang, Palu, Pangkalan Bun, Pekanbaru, Perth, Pontianak, Samarinda, Semarang, Singapore, Solo, Sorong, Surabaya, Tanjung Pinang, Tanjung Redeb, Tarakan, Ternate, Yogyakarta–International; Charter: Haikou, Nanning
Batik Air Malaysia	Kuala Lumpur–International, Kuala Lumpur–Subang, Penang (resumes 1 December 2026)
Cathay Pacific	Hong Kong
Cebu Pacific	Manila
China Airlines	Taipei–Taoyuan
China Eastern Airlines	Shanghai–Pudong
China Southern Airlines	Guangzhou, Shenzhen
Citilink	Ambon, Balikpapan, Bandar Lampung, Bangkok–Don Mueang, Banjarmasin, Batam, Bengkulu, Denpasar, Jambi, Jayapura, Kendari, Kuala Lumpur–International, Kupang, Labuan Bajo, Lombok, Makassar, Malang, Manado, Medan, Padang, Palangkaraya, Palembang, Pangkal Pinang Pekanbaru, Pontianak, Samarinda, Semarang, Siborong-Borong, Singapore, Solo, Surabaya, Tanjung Pandan, Tanjung Pinang, Yogyakarta–International; Charter: Chongqing, Da Nang, Hanoi, Kunming, Wenzhou, Zhangjiajie
Egyptair	Cairo
Emirates	Dubai–International
Ethiopian Airlines	Addis Ababa
Etihad Airways	Abu Dhabi
EVA Air	Taipei–Taoyuan
Garuda Indonesia	Ambon, Amsterdam, Balikpapan, Banda Aceh, Bandar Lampung, Bangkok–Suvarnabhumi, Banjarmasin, Batam, Denpasar, Gorontalo, Guangzhou, Hong Kong, Jambi, Jayapura, Jeddah, Kendari, Kuala Lumpur–International, Kupang, Labuan Bajo, Lombok, Makassar, Manado, Medan, Medina, Melbourne, Merauke, Padang, Palangkaraya, Palembang, Palu, Pangkal Pinang, Pekanbaru, Pontianak, Riyadh, Samarinda, Semarang, Seoul–Incheon, Shanghai–Pudong, Singapore, Solo, Sorong, Surabaya, Sydney–Kingsford Smith, Ternate, Timika, Tokyo–Haneda, Yogyakarta–International
Hainan Airlines	Haikou
IndiGo	Mumbai–Shivaji
Indonesia AirAsia	Bandar Lampung, Bandar Seri Begawan, Denpasar, Johor Bahru, Kota Kinabalu, Kuala Lumpur–International, Kuching, Labuan Bajo, Penang, Phnom Penh, Siborong-Borong
Japan Airlines	Tokyo–Narita
Juneyao Air	Shanghai–Pudong
KLM	Amsterdam, Kuala Lumpur–International
Korean Air	Seoul–Incheon
Lion Air	Ambon, Bandar Lampung, Batam, Denpasar, Kupang, Lombok, Makassar, Manado, Medan, Merauke, Padang, Palembang, Pekanbaru, Pontianak, Surabaya; Charter: Haikou, Sanya; Seasonal: Jeddah, Medina
Loong Air	Charter: Haikou, Hangzhou
Lucky Air	Kunming
Malaysia Airlines	Kuala Lumpur–International
NAM Air	Batam, Denpasar, Makassar, Muara Bungo, Pangkal Pinang, Pangkalan Bun, Pontianak, Sampit
Oman Air	Muscat
Pelita Air	Balikpapan, Banda Aceh, Banjarmasin, Denpasar, Kendari, Lombok, Makassar, Medan, Padang, Palembang, Pekanbaru, Pontianak, Singapore, Surabaya, Yogyakarta–International
Philippine Airlines	Manila
Qantas	Melbourne, Perth (resumes 14 December 2026), Sydney–Kingsford Smith
Qatar Airways	Doha
Riyadh Air	Riyadh
Royal Brunei Airlines	Bandar Seri Begawan
Saudia	Jeddah, Medina; Seasonal: Riyadh
Scoot	Singapore
Shandong Airlines	Xiamen
Shenzhen Airlines	Shenzhen
Singapore Airlines	Singapore
Spring Airlines	Guangzhou, Shenzhen
SriLankan Airlines	Colombo–Bandaranaike
Sriwijaya Air	Denpasar, Jambi, Makassar, Morowali, Pangkal Pinang, Pontianak, Tanjung Pandan, Yogyakarta–International
Starlux Airlines	Taipei–Taoyuan
Super Air Jet	Balikpapan, Banda Aceh, Bandar Lampung, Banjarmasin, Banyuwangi, Batam, Bengkulu, Denpasar, Jambi, Kediri, Kendari, Kupang, Labuan Bajo, Lombok, Makassar, Medan, Padang, Palangkaraya, Palembang, Palu, Pangkal Pinang, Pekanbaru, Pontianak, Sampit, Semarang, Siborong-Borong, Singkawang, Sorong, Surabaya, Tanjung Pandan, Ternate, Yogyakarta–International
Thai Airways International	Bangkok–Suvarnabhumi
Thai Lion Air	Bangkok–Don Mueang
TransNusa	Bandar Lampung, Bangkok–Suvarnabhumi, Denpasar, Guangzhou, Kuala Lumpur–International, Kuala Lumpur–Subang, Lombok, Penang, Singapore, Singkawang, Yogyakarta–International; Charter: Guiyang
Trinity Airways	Seoul–Incheon
Turkish Airlines	Istanbul
VietJet Air	Da Nang (begins 20 December 2026), Hanoi, Ho Chi Minh City
Vietnam Airlines	Hanoi, Ho Chi Minh City
XiamenAir	Chongqing, Fuzhou, Hangzhou, Nanjing, Wuhan, Xiamen

=== Cargo ===
Airlines	Destinations
ANA Cargo	Bangkok–Suvarnabhumi, Tokyo–Narita
Cargolux	Dubai–Al Maktoum, Hong Kong, Luxembourg
Cathay Cargo	Hanoi, Hong Kong, Penang
Central Airlines	Shenzhen
China Airlines Cargo	Kuala Lumpur–International, Taipei–Taoyuan
China Cargo Airlines	Hangzhou, Ningbo
DHL Aviation	Hong Kong, Singapore
FedEx Express	Guangzhou, Singapore
Garuda Indonesia Cargo	Jeddah, Shanghai–Hongqiao, Singapore, Sydney–Kingsford Smith, Tokyo–Haneda
K-Mile Air	Bangkok–Suvarnabhumi, Singapore
Korean Air Cargo	Ho Chi Minh City, Penang, Seoul–Incheon
MASkargo	Kuala Lumpur–International, Seoul–Incheon
My Indo Airlines	Cebu, Christmas Island, Fuzhou, Hanoi, Ho Chi Minh City, Hong Kong, Johor Bahru, Labuan, Makassar, Manado, Manila, Medan, Perth, Phnom Penh, Pontianak, Singapore, Surabaya
Qatar Airways Cargo	Doha
Raya Airways	Kuala Lumpur–Subang
Rimbun Air	Balikpapan, Banda Aceh, Banjarmasin, Batam, Gorontalo, Kendari, Lombok, Makassar, Manado, Medan, Padang, Palangkaraya, Palu, Pekanbaru, Ternate

=== Busiest routes ===
Jakarta–Singapore is one of the world's busiest international air routes; passenger numbers on this route are growing fast. It was the second busiest international route in Asia after Hong Kong–Taipei in 2015. Singapore Airlines alone operates more than 70 weekly flights between Jakarta and Singapore. The Jakarta Soekarno-Hatta–Surabaya route is ranked ninth busiest in the world by IATA in 2016. Jakarta–Singapore and Jakarta–Kuala Lumpur routes are ranked in the top ten of world's busiest international air routes in 2018.

=== New traffic procedure ===
To ease congestion, the airport authority implemented a new traffic procedure, the 72 Improved Runway Capacity (IRC 72), to handle 72 planes per hour. This limited a plane to 30–45 minutes only for arrival and unloading of passengers, to allow other planes to use the parking space. Gradually it has been implemented and on 26 June 2014, IRC 72 has been implemented fully for the period of 00:00 am to 01:30 am, 02:00 am to 10:00 am and 11:30 pm to 00:00 am with occupancy periods for aircraft are reduced from 110 seconds to 90 seconds of takeoff and from 65 seconds to 50 seconds for landing. The low time is from 04:00 pm to 10:00 pm with only maximum 32 flights/hour. By 2015, IRC 72 will become IRC 86 with the opening of the new terminal. As a comparison, London Heathrow Airport, which has 2 runways like SHIA, can handle 100 flights per hour, so the target for SHIA has been revised to 92 flights per hour by 2015. As of July 2017, maximum flight frequency at Soekarno–Hatta International Airport had been increased to 81 take-offs and landings per hour to accommodate increasing demand from aviation companies.

== Ground transportations ==
There are several transportation options available for access to the airport: local airport terminal shuttles, trains, buses, taxi services of various kinds, and cars. There is a free shuttle bus service and people maneuver system Skytrain to connect the terminals of the airport.

=== Bus ===
Transjakarta provides airport service through route SH1, running between Terminal Kalideres and the Soekarno-Hatta Offices area, and route SH2, running between Blok M and the Soekarno-Hatta Airport Train Station. Other bus companies, including the state-owned Perum DAMRI and private company Primajasa, provide services to various destinations from the airport. Jabodetabek Airport Connexion which consist of Perum DAMRI, Big Bird, and Sinar Jaya Megah Langgeng serve routes from the airport to certain malls and hotels in Greater Jakarta.

=== Rail ===
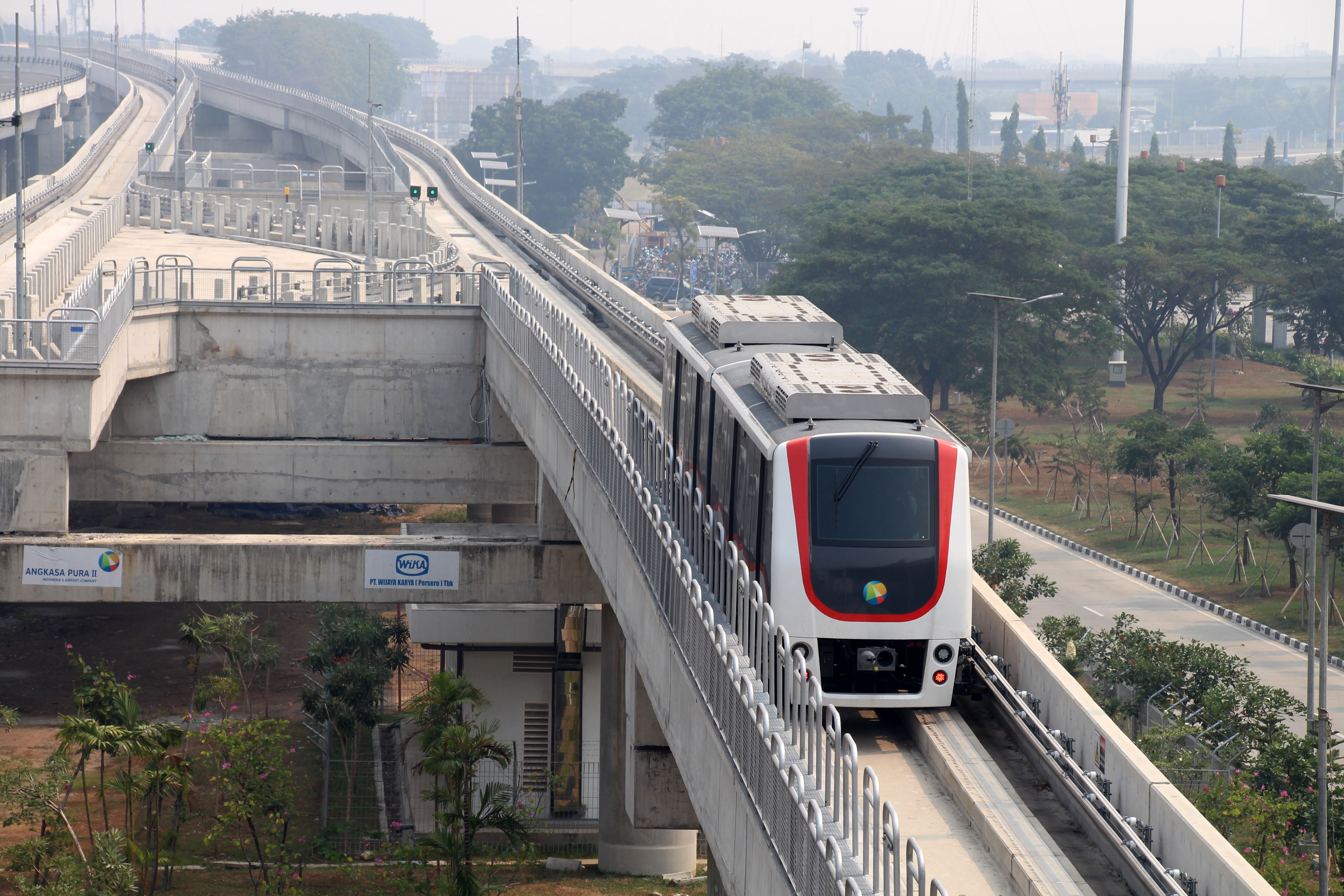
Skytrain Automated People Mover for inter-terminal airport shuttle service

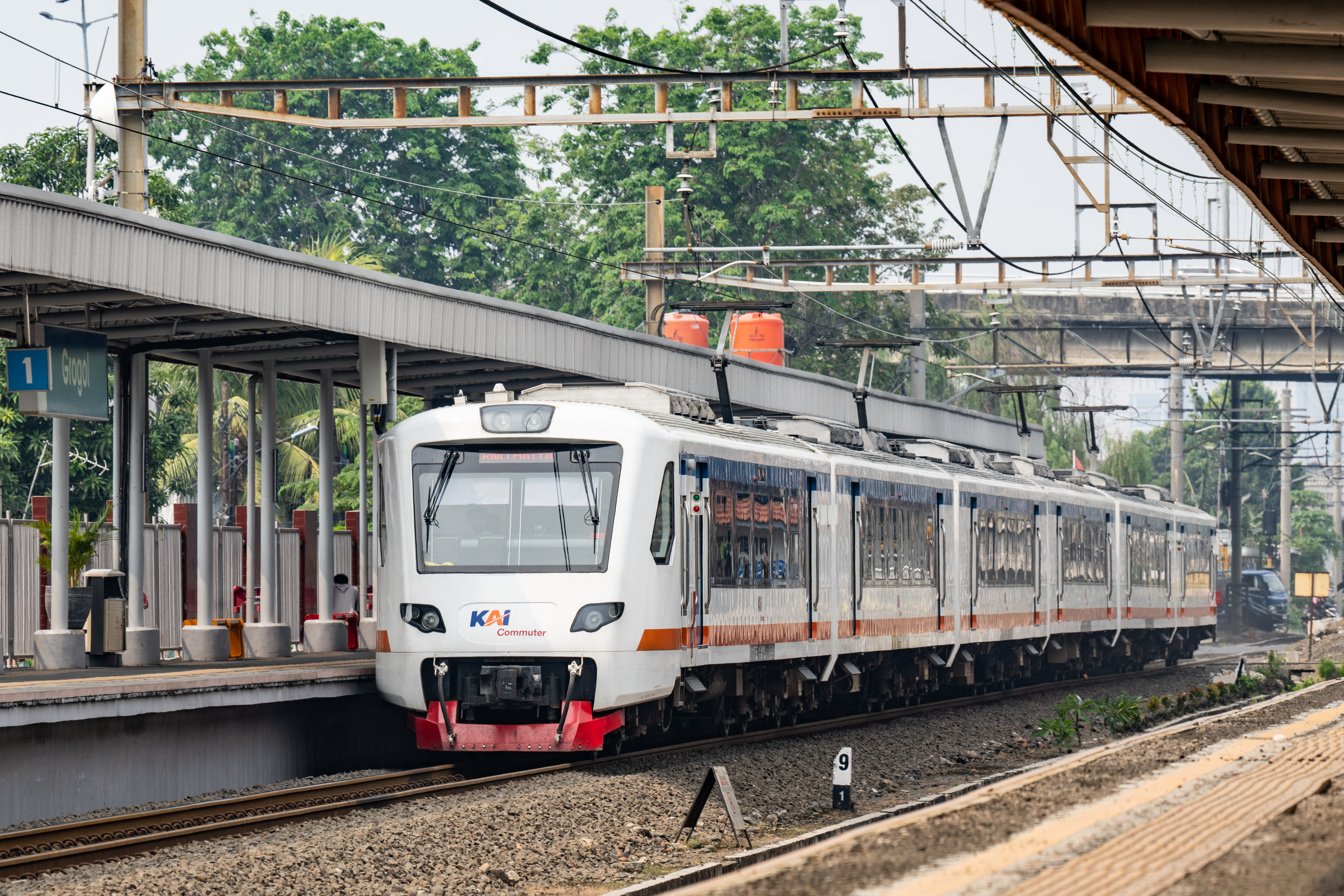
Airport rail link arriving at BNI City station

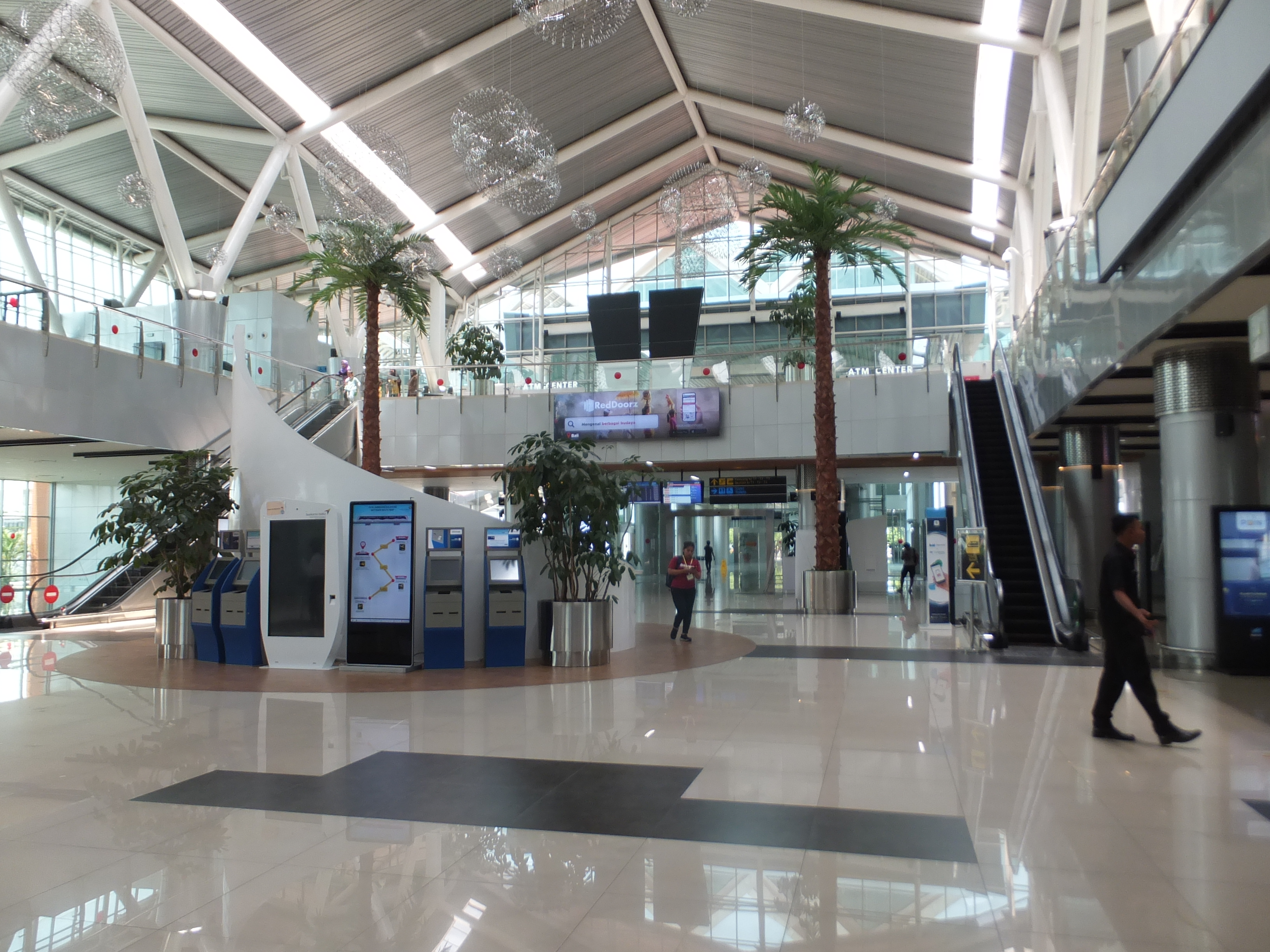
Soekarno–Hatta International Airport Station

==== Skytrain ====
The Soekarno–Hatta Airport Skytrain (Indonesian: Kalayang Bandara Soekarno–Hatta) is a semi-driverless 3.05 kilometre Automated People Mover System (APMS) which connects Terminals 1, 2, 3 and Soekarno–Hatta International Airport Station, free of charge. Trains are spaced 5 minutes apart, with 7 minutes needed to get from Terminal 1 to Terminal 3. The trains are only available on the landside.

The system uses Airport Automated People Mover System rubber-tyred metro manufactured by state-owned enterprise LEN Industri in cooperation with South Korean Woojin Industries.

==== Airport rail link ====
Soekarno–Hatta Airport Commuter Line connects Jakarta city centre with the airport. The train takes 45 minutes to travel from Manggarai station in South Jakarta to Soekarno–Hatta International Airport Station. Each train accommodates up to 272 passengers and was originally designed to serve about 35,000 passengers with 122 trips a day. As of July 2025, there is a 30-minute headway between the train departures. The Rail Link makes 35 trips daily from Manggarai station to SHIA between 05:00 and 22:00. Trips from SHIA to Manggarai run from 05:57 to 22:57.

An express line between Halim Perdanakusuma International Airport in South Jakarta and SHIA is under planning stage, to be built by an external investor in a public–private partnership. The express train will take 30 minutes to connect the airports. The construction of this line has been delayed and completion was originally projected to be in 2019 at the earliest. As of 2025, the express line has yet to be constructed.

== Awards and recognitions ==
In 1995, the landscaping of Soekarno–Hatta airport was awarded by Aga Khan Award for Architecture as one of the best examples of integrating the terminal building pavilions with lush tropical garden harmoniously.

The airport was named the best airport by hygiene measures in Asia-Pacific in 2020 by Airports Council International.

== Accidents and incidents ==
- On 23 January 2003, a Star Air Boeing 737 touched down 500 meters (1,600 ft) past the threshold of runway 25L, a little left of the centerline, at a time of heavy rainfall with associated heavy winds. It went off the side of the runway, causing substantial damage to the aircraft's undercarriage and belly.
- 2003 Soekarno–Hatta International Airport bombing – On 27 April 2003, a bomb exploded in terminal 2, departure hall of the domestic terminal. The bomb was hidden under a table of a KFC stall and exploded during lunch hours. 10 people were injured in the blast, a 17-year-old teenager identified as Yuli was seriously injured and had to have her legs amputated. Emergency services were rushed to the scene and suspected that the motive of the bombing was due to the Free Aceh Movement, a separatist movement in Aceh. This was proved by the location of the blast, which was located on the domestic passenger hall rather than on the international passenger hall.
- On 9 January 2021, Sriwijaya Air Flight 182, a Boeing 737-524 PK-CLC plunged into the Java Sea 6 minutes after taking off from the airport. The flight was a scheduled domestic flight to Supadio International Airport, Borneo, All 62 people on board were killed.
