= Jenderal Besar Abdul Haris Nasution Airport =

Airport in North Sumatra, Indonesia

Jenderal Besar Abdul Haris Nasution Airport Bandar Udara Jenderal Besar Abdul Haris Nasution
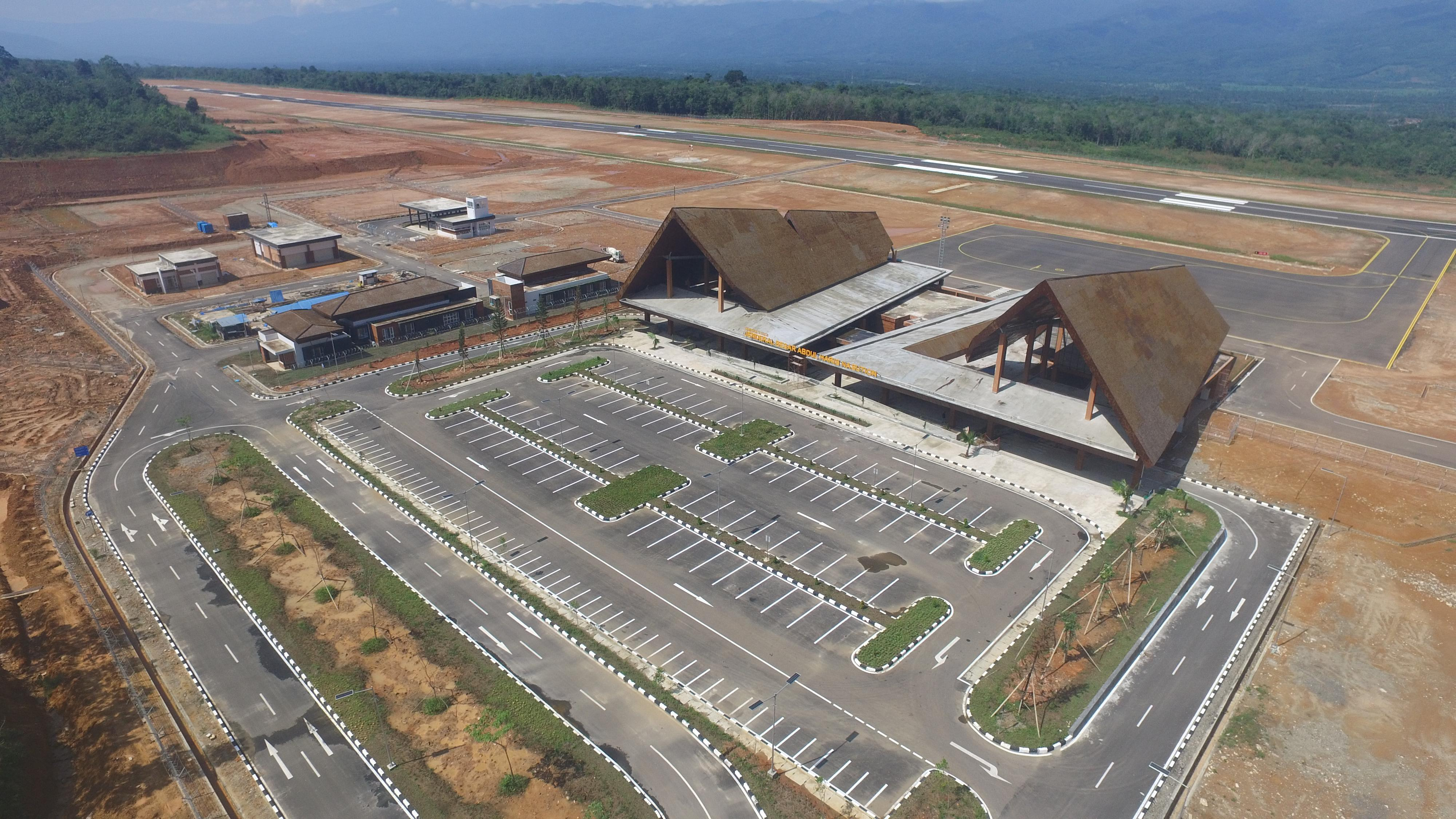
- IATA: JHN; ICAO: WIMF

Summary
- Airport type: Public
- Owner: Government of Indonesia
- Operator: Directorate General of Civil Aviation
- Serves: Panyabungan
- Location: Bukit Malintang, Mandailing Natal Regency, North Sumatra, Indonesia
- Time zone: WIB (UTC+07:00)
- Elevation AMSL: 303 m (994 ft)
- Coordinates: 0°56′58.4″N 99°31′59.291″E

Map
- Location of airport in Sumatra JHN/WIMF (Indonesia)

Runways
Direction	Length		Surface
Direction	m	ft	Surface
15/33	1,450	4,757	Asphalt
- Source: DGCA

Jenderal Besar Abdul Haris Nasution Airport (IATA: JHN, ICAO: WIMF) is a domestic airport serving Panyabungan, the capital of Mandailing Natal Regency in the southwestern part of North Sumatra, Indonesia. The airport is named after Abdul Haris Nasution, an Indonesian Army general and politician from Mandailing Natal, who was posthumously recognized as a National Hero of Indonesia. Located in Bukit Malintang District, approximately 10 km (6.2 miles) from Panyabungan town center, the airport commenced operations in 2025 and serves as one of the main gateways to Panyabungan and Mandailing Natal Regency as well as the surrounding regions. Currently, the airport operates a single scheduled route to Medan, the provincial capital of North Sumatra, with flights provided by Susi Air.

== History ==
Prior to the airport's construction, access to and from Mandailing Natal was limited. Air travelers heading to the regency had to fly to either Silangit Airport in Siborong-borong, Ferdinand Lumban Tobing Airport in Sibolga, or Aek Godang Airport in Padang Sidempuan before continuing their journey by road. Hajj pilgrims traveling to Saudi Arabia also had to travel overland to Medan, a journey that typically took up to 12 hours, before boarding their flights. As a result, a new airport was proposed to serve Mandailing Natal and the surrounding regions, including parts of the neighboring province of West Sumatra, while also supporting regional economic development.

Preparation for the construction of the airport began in 2016 and involved the acquisition of 74 hectares of community-owned land and 24 hectares of land owned by the North Sumatra Provincial Plantation Agency. Construction was initially scheduled to begin in 2017 but was delayed several times before finally commencing in 2022 due to delays in meeting the administrative and technical requirements for the airport's construction, as well as the impacts of the COVID-19 pandemic. Construction of Bukit Malintang Airport began in 2022 under the auspices of the Ministry of Transportation, with a budget of approximately Rp718 billion financed through a multi-year funding scheme. According to the Ministry of Transportation, the airport features a runway measuring 1,450 meters in length and 30 meters in width. The land for the airport site and its supporting facilities was provided by the Mandailing Natal Regency Government.

Originally named Bukit Malintang Airport after the district in which it is located, the airport was renamed to its current name on 31 January 2024 following the issuance of a decree by the Ministry of Transportation. The renaming honored Abdul Haris Nasution, a native of Mandailing Natal, Indonesian Army general, politician, and National Hero of Indonesia, following a proposal submitted by the North Sumatra Regional House of Representatives (DPRD) in 2023.

By May 2024, construction of the airport had been fully completed, including both landside and airside facilities. Despite the completion of construction, the airport only commenced operations on 11 January 2025, with the launch of the Medan–Mandailing Natal route operated by Susi Air.

In May 2026, Lion Air Group expressed interest in launching Mandailing Natal–Medan and Mandailing Natal–Padang routes following a meeting between Lion Air Group owner Rusdi Kirana and the Regent of Mandailing Natal Regency.

== Facilities and development ==
The airport has a single terminal building with an area of 2,537 m². The terminal's design was inspired by the Bagas Godang, a traditional house and architectural symbol of the Mandailing people. On the airside, the airport features a single runway measuring 1,450 meters in length and 30 meters in width, constructed with asphalt concrete (AC-WC) pavement. The taxiway measures 75 meters in length and 15 meters in width, while the aircraft apron measures 105 meters by 65 meters. These facilities enable the airport to accommodate aircraft up to the size of the ATR 72-600.

Under the original plan, the airport's runway was expected to be extended to 2,500 meters to accommodate narrow-body aircraft such as the Boeing 737.

== Airlines and destinations ==
The following destinations are served from Jenderal Besar Abdul Haris Nasution Airport:

Airlines	Destinations
Susi Air	Medan
