= Lasikin Airport =

Lasikin Airport Bandar Udara Lasikin
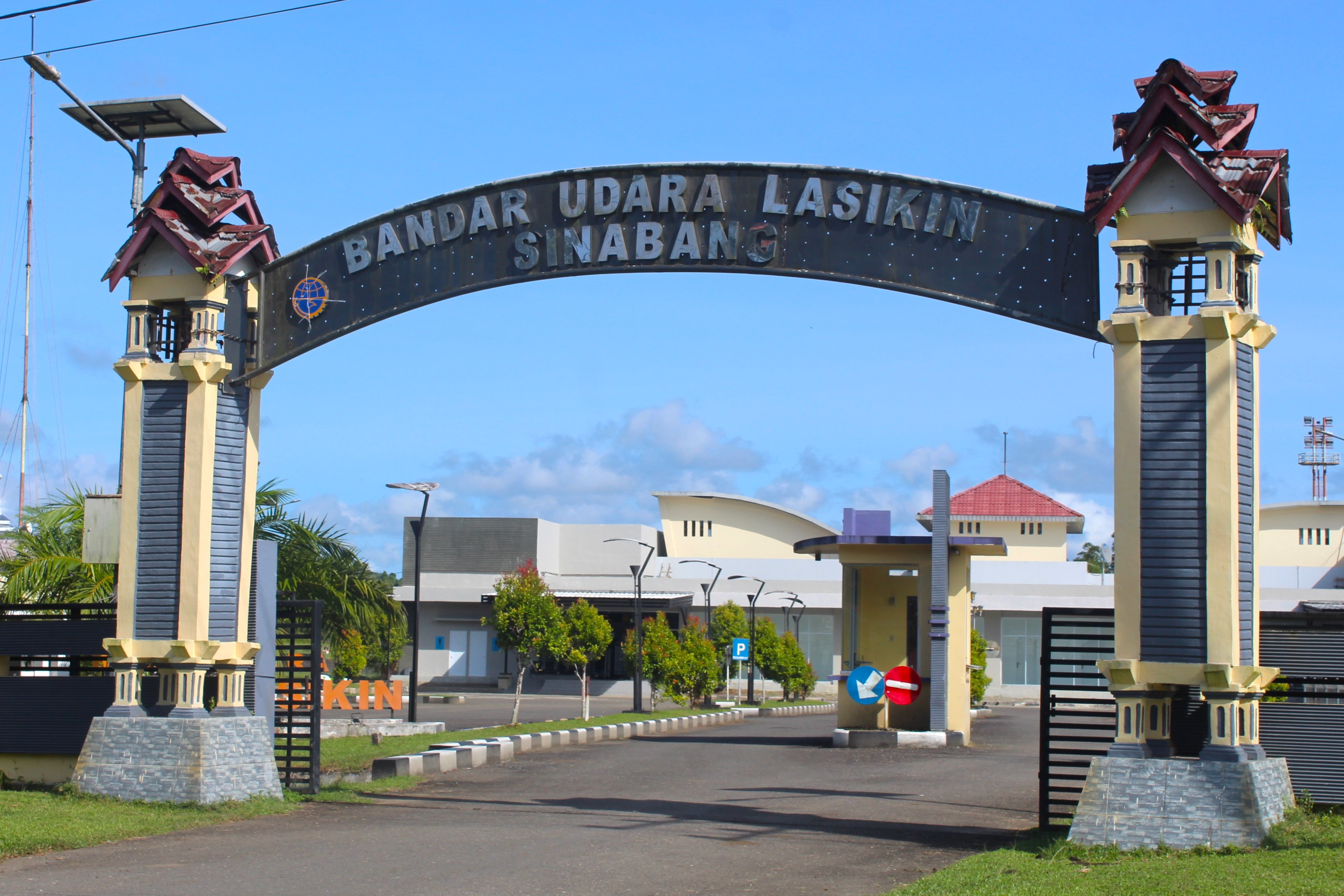
- IATA: LKI; ICAO: WITG

Summary
- Airport type: Public
- Operator: Government
- Location: Sinabang, Pulau Simeulue, Indonesia
- Time zone: WIB (UTC+07:00)
- Elevation AMSL: 26 ft / 8 m
- Coordinates: 02°25′00″N 96°19′45″E

Map
- Location in Northern Sumatra, Sumatra and Indonesia Lasikin Airport (Sumatra) Lasikin Airport (Indonesia)

Runways
Direction	Length		Surface
Direction	m	ft	Surface
07/25	1,710	5,610	Asphalt

Lasikin Airport (ICAO: WITG) is an airport in Sinabang, Simeulue island, Aceh, Indonesia. The airport was damaged by the 2004 tsunami and destroyed by the 2005 Nias–Simeulue earthquake. It was reopened on 1 November 2007 following 45 billion rupiah of spending by the Aceh-Nias recovery agency with control tower and enlarged runway facilitating larger turboprop aircraft (Fokker 50).

== Airlines and destinations ==
The following destinations are served from this Airport:

Airlines	Destinations
Susi Air	Banda Aceh, Medan
Wings Air	Medan
