= Sultan Iskandar Muda International Airport =

Airport in Banda Aceh, Indonesia

Sultan Iskandar Muda International Airport Bandar Udara Internasional Sultan Iskandar Muda Bandar Udara Antar Nanggroë Sultan Iskandar Muda
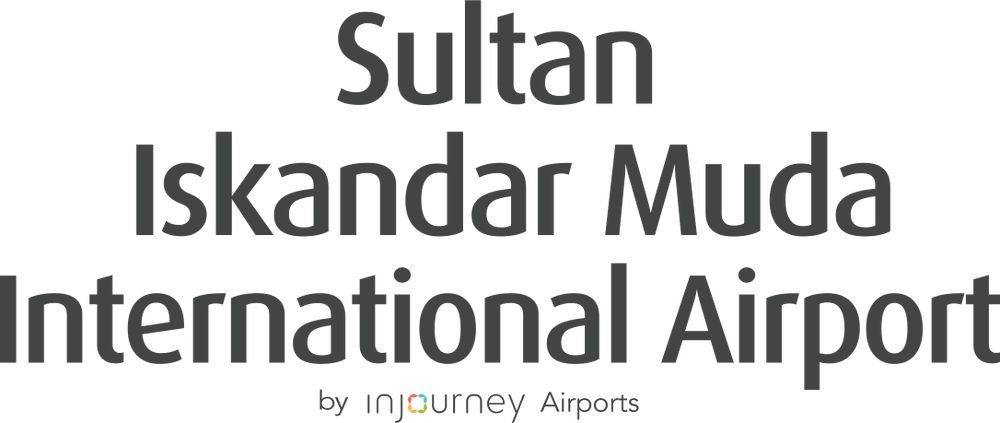

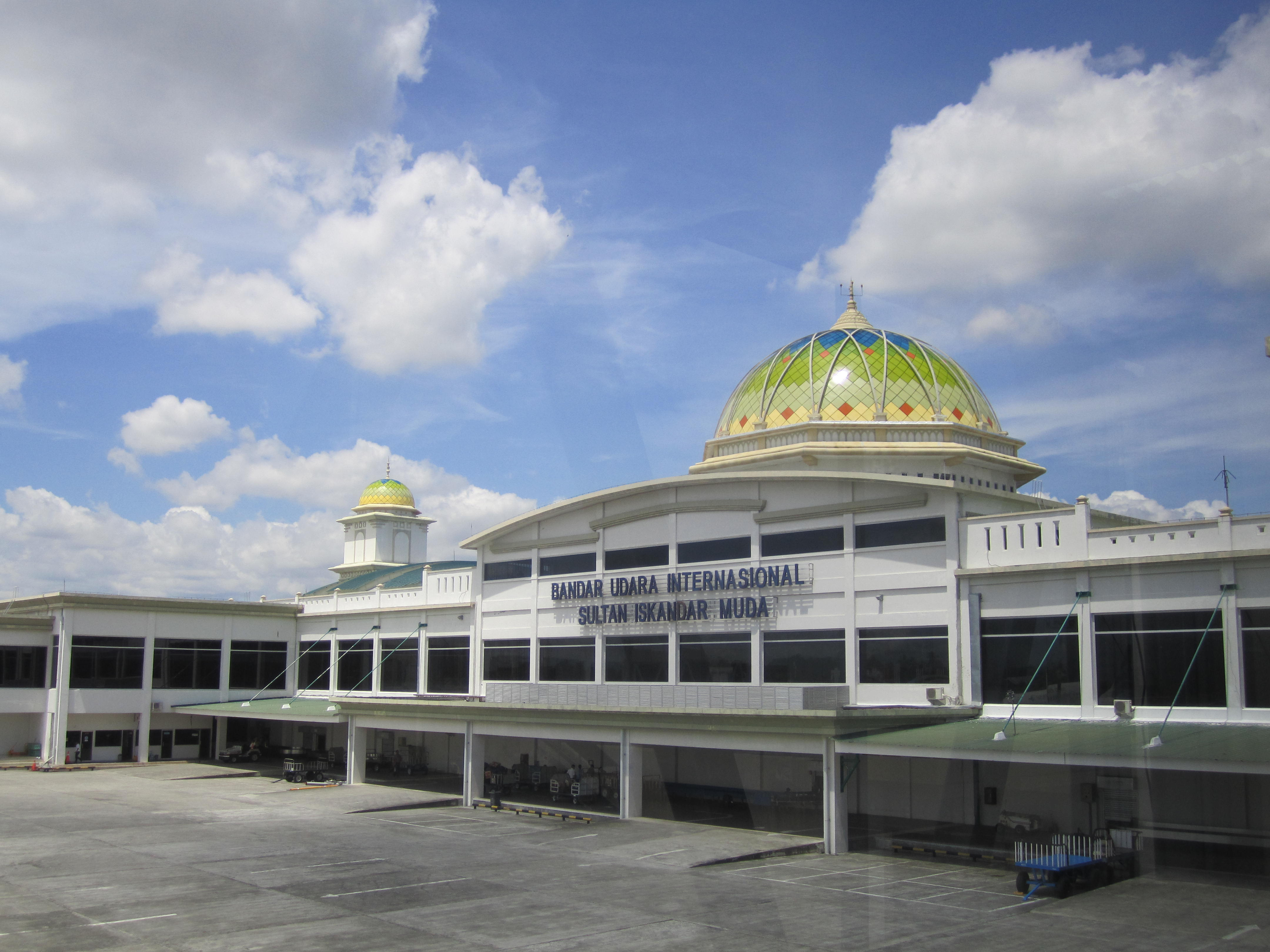
- IATA: BTJ; ICAO: WITT; WMO: 96011

Summary
- Airport type: Public / Military
- Owner: Government of Indonesia
- Operator: InJourney Airports
- Serves: Banda Aceh
- Location: Blang Bintang District, Aceh Besar Regency, Aceh, Sumatra, Indonesia
- Opened: 1943; 83 years ago
- Time zone: WIB (UTC+07:00)
- Elevation AMSL: 20 m (66 ft)
- Coordinates: 05°31′24″N 95°25′13″E
- Website: www.sultaniskandarmuda-airport.co.id

Map
- Location in Aceh Location in Sumatra

Runways
Direction	Length		Surface
Direction	m	ft	Surface
17/35	3,000	9,843	Asphalt

Statistics (2024)
- Passengers: 797,314 (▲15.9%)
- Cargo (tonnes): 8,125 (▲73.8%)
- Aircraft movements: 8,811 (▲41.4%)
- Source: DGCA

Sultan Iskandar Muda International Airport (IATA: BTJ, ICAO: WITT), formerly known as Blangbintang Airport, is an international airport serving Banda Aceh, the capital of Aceh Province in Indonesia. While it primarily serves Banda Aceh, the airport is not located within the city itself; it lies in Aceh Besar Regency, approximately 13.5 km (8.4 miles) southeast of the city center. The airport is named in honor of Sultan Iskandar Muda (1583-1636), the twelfth ruler of the Aceh Sultanate, who reigned from 1607 to 1636 and is recognized as a national hero of Indonesia. As the main air gateway to Banda Aceh and the wider Aceh region, the airport plays a vital role in regional connectivity. It operates regular domestic services to major Indonesian cities such as Jakarta and Medan, as well as international services to Kuala Lumpur and Penang in Malaysia. It also handles seasonal flights to Jeddah and Medina in Saudi Arabia to accommodate Hajj and Umrah pilgrims.

In addition to functioning as a commercial airport, it also hosts the Sultan Iskandar Muda Air Force Base, a Type B facility of the Indonesian Air Force. The airbase is situated southeast of the passenger terminal, across the runway.

== History ==
=== Construction and early history ===
The airport was originally constructed by the Japanese in 1943 during World War II, serving as a military airbase to support their operations against Allied forces during the occupation of Indonesia. It was initially known as Blangbintang Airport, named after the district where it is located. Before this airport was built, there had been another airport in Lhoknga, constructed by the Dutch colonial government. This airport was seized by the Japanese during their invasion in 1942 and repurposed as a military airbase. Together with Blangbintang, both airbases became key strongholds for the Japanese during the war.

In its early years, Blangbintang Airport featured a T-shaped runway measuring 1,400 m × 30 m (4,593 ft × 98 ft). Following Japan's surrender, the airbase remained closed for several years. During this period, the Japanese left behind a large stockpile of weapons at the base, which was eventually seized by local Acehnese militias. During the Indonesian National Revolution, the airfield was taken over by the Indonesian Air Force. When the Dutch launched Operation Kraai in late 1948, most airfields operated by the Indonesian Air Force were captured, with Blangbintang Airfield being the notable exception. However, Indonesian Air Force personnel subsequently abandoned the airfield after receiving reports that the Dutch were preparing to launch an assault on Aceh.

After the Indonesian National Revolution and the Dutch withdrawal from the region, the airport remained inactive for several years before being reopened in 1953 by the newly independent Indonesian government. The first aircraft to land after its reopening was a DC-3 Dakota, known in its military variant as the C-47.

In 1968, the airport underwent a major runway upgrade that involved extending, widening, and repaving the runway to 1,850 m × 45 m (6,070 ft × 148 ft), allowing the airport to accommodate larger aircraft such as the Fokker F28. Further development took place in 1993 and 1994 ahead of the Musabaqah Tilawatil Quran (MTQ) festival held in Banda Aceh, during which the runway was extended again to 2,250 m × 45 m (7,382 ft × 148 ft). This upgrade enabled the airport to accommodate larger aircraft such as the Douglas DC-9 and Boeing 737.

=== Contemporary history ===
Refugee camp for people displaced by the 2004 Indian Ocean tsunami at Sultan Iskandar Muda International Airport, 2005

In 1994, management of the airport was transferred to Angkasa Pura II, which was later rebranded as InJourney Airports. Just a year later, the airport was renamed to its current name in honor of Sultan Iskandar Muda, a prominent ruler of the Aceh Sultanate who reigned from 1607 to 1636 and is recognized as a national hero of Indonesia. He is widely remembered for ushering in the golden age of the Aceh Sultanate, during which it became a prosperous and dominant power in the region. Sultan Iskandar Muda is also celebrated for his resistance against Portuguese colonial expansion in Southeast Asia. This was followed by another runway extension in 1999, increasing its length to 2,500 meters to accommodate medium-sized aircraft such as the Airbus A330, in preparation for the commencement of Hajj flights for pilgrims traveling to Jeddah.

During the insurgency in Aceh, the airport served as a strategic launch point for aircraft of the Indonesian Air Force, which carried out attacks on Acehnese rebels. It also became a key arrival point for Indonesian troops preparing for military operations in the region. On 19 May 2003, 458 Indonesian paratroopers landed near the airport as part of an offensive against Acehnese rebels.

The airport sustained significant damage following the powerful earthquake and tsunami that devastated Aceh on 26 December 2004. However, the airport was fortunate to avoid direct impact from the tsunami waves, enabling it to remain operational. During the emergency response phase, the airport played a crucial role as a central hub for international aid. All logistics sent to support the people of Aceh were processed through the airport before being distributed to various affected regions. Additionally, the area surrounding the airport was utilized as a temporary refuge for displaced individuals during the crisis.

Sultan Iskandar Muda International Airport got World's Best Airport for Halal Travellers in the World Halal Tourism Awards 2016.

In 2020, all international flights to and from the airport were suspended amid the COVID-19 pandemic. International services resumed in October 2022 following the easing of travel restrictions, with AirAsia restoring flights to Kuala Lumpur, Malaysia.

== Facilities and development ==
=== Facilities ===
Check-in hall

Boarding gate

Between 2007 and 2009, Sultan Iskandar Muda Airport underwent a significant expansion, which included the construction of a larger passenger terminal along with various supporting infrastructure. The new terminal was designed in a modern Acehnese architectural style, enriched with traditional decorative motifs. Spanning three floors and covering 14,144 square meters, the terminal is capable of accommodating up to 1.75 million passengers annually. It is equipped with two jet bridges, with a third added in 2018 to enhance passenger handling capacity. The interior of the terminal showcases a harmonious fusion of modern Islamic architecture and aesthetic elements drawn from traditional Acehnese design. Externally, the terminal features three prominent domes that symbolize Aceh’s unique status in Indonesia, representing the pillars of religion, culture, and education.

The development project also involved extending and widening the runway to 3,000 meters to accommodate wide-body aircraft such as the Boeing 747, expanding the aircraft parking apron, and constructing a new air traffic control (ATC) tower. The total investment for the project reached 503 billion rupiah, comprising 125 billion rupiah from Angkasa Pura II’s internal funds and 478 billion rupiah from the Aceh Rehabilitation and Reconstruction Agency (BRR). The upgraded airport was officially inaugurated by the President Susilo Bambang Yudhoyono, on 20 August 2009, during his visit to Aceh to open the fifth annual Aceh Cultural Week (Pekan Kebudayaan Aceh). On 9 October 2011, the airport successfully accommodated its first Boeing 747-400 landing and departure.

=== Development ===
The area surrounding the airport is planned to be developed into a commercial area comprising hotels, warehousing facilities, tourist attractions, and children's recreational facilities. The proposed hotel development is intended to address the lack of accommodation near the airport, as most hotels are concentrated in central Banda Aceh. Because the airport is located in Aceh Besar Regency, relatively far from the city centre, transit hotels would provide convenient accommodation for passengers with early-morning flights. Airport authorities have also begun promoting the development to potential investors as part of efforts to increase the airport's aero and non-aero business potential. The investment offering remains subject to the findings of a feasibility study conducted by prospective partners to assess the area's business potential. Within the commercial area, the Aceh provincial government also plans to construct a dedicated terminal for Umrah pilgrims travelling to Saudi Arabia. The commercial area is planned to be developed on a 51-hectare site that was transferred by the Aceh provincial government to Angkasa Pura II in 2016.

== Airlines and destinations ==
=== Passenger ===
Airlines	Destinations
AirAsia	Kuala Lumpur–International
Batik Air	Jakarta–Soekarno-Hatta
Citilink	Seasonal: Jeddah
Firefly	Penang
Garuda Indonesia	Jakarta–Soekarno-Hatta; Seasonal: Jeddah, Medina
Lion Air	Seasonal: Jeddah, Medina
Pelita Air	Jakarta–Soekarno-Hatta
Super Air Jet	Jakarta–Soekarno-Hatta, Kuala Lumpur–International, Medan
Susi Air	Kutacane, Sabang, Sinabang, Tapaktuan
Wings Air	Medan

== Statistics ==
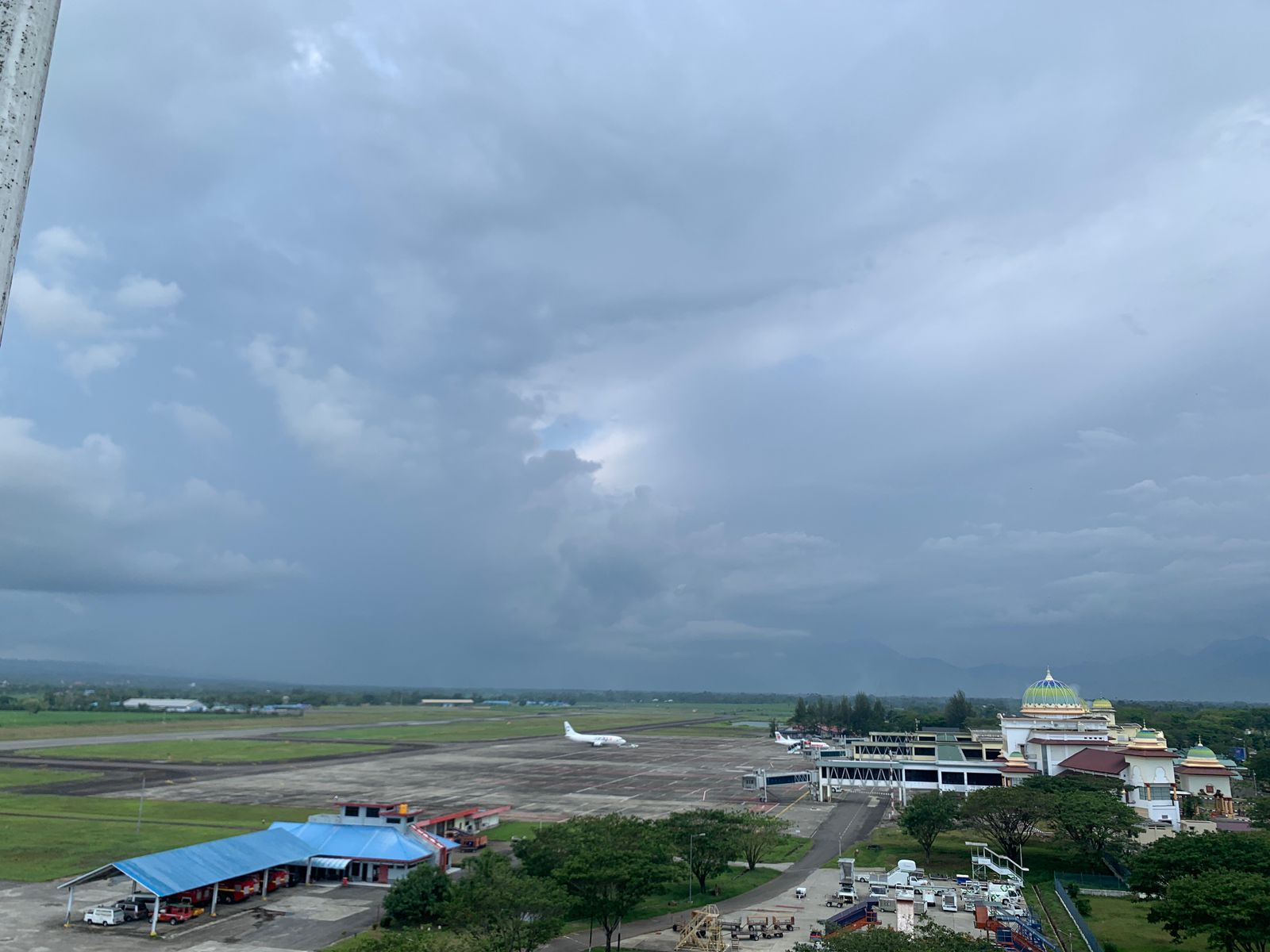
Apron view of Sultan Iskandar Muda International Airport

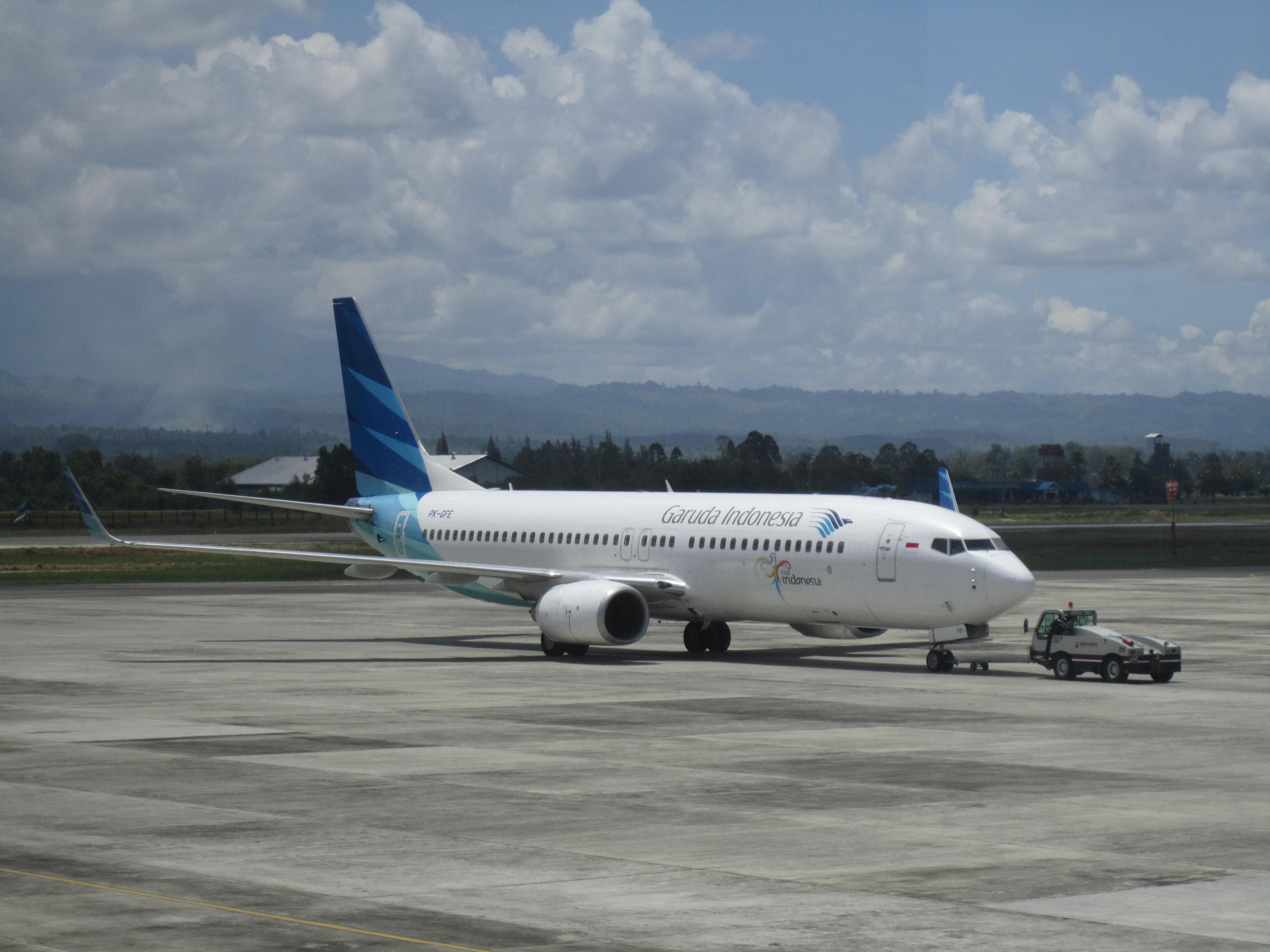
A Garuda Indonesia Boeing 737-800 at Sultan Iskandar Muda International Airport

Annual passenger numbers and aircraft statistics
Year	Passengers handled	Passenger % change	Cargo (tonnes)	Cargo % change	Aircraft movements	Aircraft % change
2006	527,421	Steady	2,170	Steady	8,495	Steady
2007	549,198	▲4.1	2,314	▲6.6	7,019	▼17.4
2008	568,581	▲3.5	3,256	▲40.7	N/A	Steady
2009	577,825	▲1.6	2,724	▼16.3	5,604	Steady
2010	573,240	▼0.8	3,033	▲11.3	6,213	▲10.9
2011	705,713	▲23.1	5,153	▲69.9	5,769	▼7.1
2012	672,695	▼4.7	2,785	▼46.0	5,851	▲1.4
2013	711,796	▲5.8	2,942	▲5.6	7,308	▲24.9
2014	721,728	▲1.4	3,653	▲24.2	5,594	▼23.5
2015	748,721	▲3.7	3,759	▲2.9	6,050	▲8.2
2016	954,911	▲27.5	4,038	▲7.4	8,819	▲45.8
2017	1,198,274	▲25.5	5,146	▲27.4	10,231	▲16.0
2018	1,273,132	▲6.2	5,836	▲13.4	10,510	▲2.7
2019	1,106,674	▼13.1	5,070	▼13.1	9,279	▼11.7
2020	381,389	▼65.5	5,343	▲5.4	4,204	▼54.7
2021	321,285	▼15.8	7,438	▲39.2	3,975	▼5.4
2022	432,090	▲34.5	7,014	▼5.7	6,485	▲63.1
2023	687,969	▲59.2	4,676	▼33.3	6,230	▼3.9
2024	797,314	▲15.9	8,125	▲73.8	8,811	▲41.4
^{Source: DGCA, BPS}

== Accidents and incidents ==
- On 4 January 2005, a Boeing 737-200C operated by Tri-MG Intra Asia Airlines was involved in relief operations in the tsunami-stricken area of Banda Aceh. While landing at the airport at night, the aircraft struck a water buffalo that had wandered onto the runway. The impact caused the port-side main landing gear to collapse and damaged the landing gear and port engine. No injuries were reported, but the aircraft was declared a total loss and was subsequently scrapped several months later.
