= Dhoho Airport =

Dhoho Airport Bandar Udara Dhoho

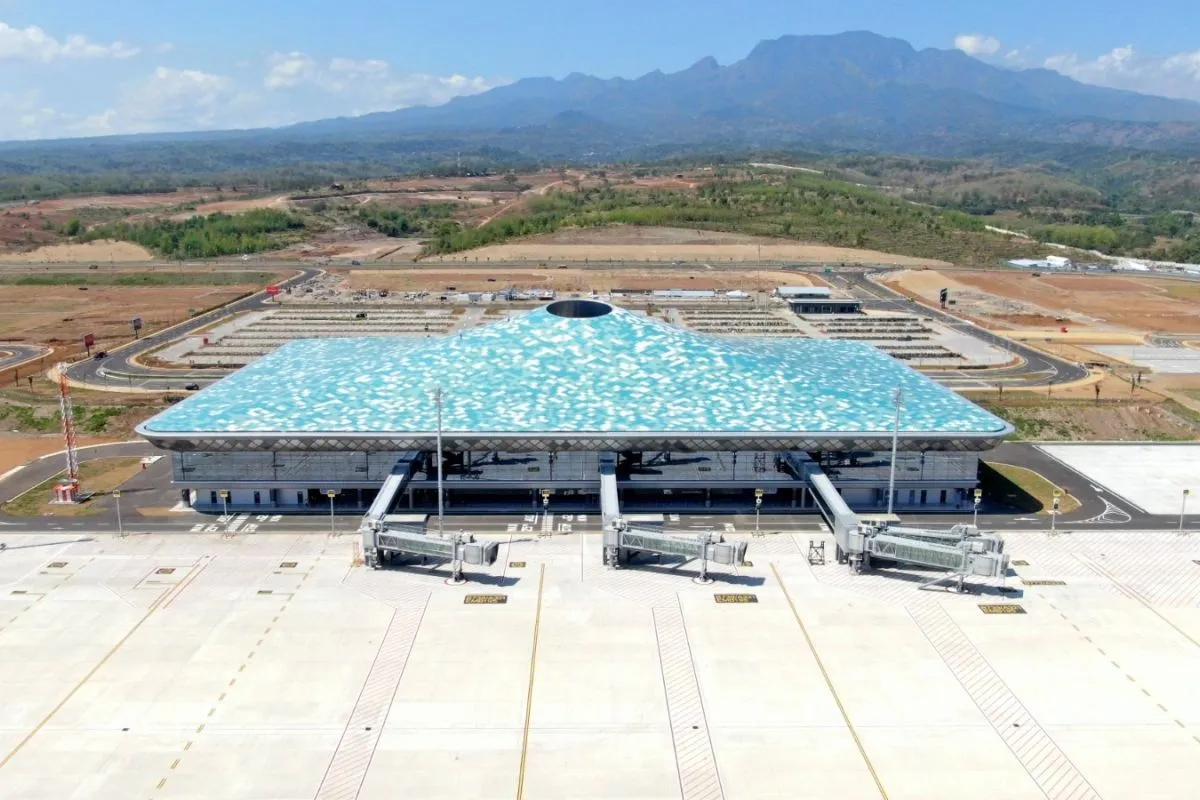
- IATA: DHX; ICAO: WARD

Summary
- Airport type: Public
- Owner: Gudang Garam
- Operator: InJourney Airports
- Serves: Kediri
- Location: Kediri Regency, East Java, Indonesia
- Built: 2024; 2 years ago
- Time zone: WIB (UTC+07:00)
- Elevation AMSL: 380 ft (120 m)
- Coordinates: 7°45′42″S 111°57′05″E

Map
- Location of airport in Java

Runways
Direction	Length		Surface
Direction	ft	m	Surface
14/32	10,827	3,300	Asphalt

Dhoho Airport (Indonesian: Bandar Udara Dhoho) is an airport that serves Kediri, situated approximately 120 kilometers southwest of Surabaya, and alongside Kediri also serves the Blitar and Nganjuk regencies of East Java, Indonesia. The goal of developing the airport was to boost economic growth in the southern parts of East Java, as well as to supplement the operations of Juanda International Airport in Surabaya and Abdul Rachman Saleh Airport in Malang.

The airport began domestic passenger operations on 5 April 2024, and is built to be able to accommodate international travel. Dhoho International Airport is the first ever airport in Indonesia to be fully funded by the private sector and was developed in three phases under a public-private partnership scheme with a concession period of 30 to 50 years.

== Development ==
The construction project of Dhoho International Airport is one of the National Strategic Project of Indonesia. Kediri-based cigarette maker PT Gudang Garam is investing Rp10 trillion (US$709.22 million) to develop the airport. The company also owned an airline, namely Surya Air and planned the airport as the hub of that airline. After completion the airport will be operated by PT Angkasa Pura I. Surbana Jurong, a Singaporean company, was also hired to consult and review the overall project structure and organisation.

Groundbreaking was done through virtual communication due to COVID-19 on April 15, 2020. The airport will have a land area of about 372 hectares. The runway will be built with a length of 3,300 meters and can accommodate wide-body aircraft Class 4E. The airport is expected to accommodate around 1.5 million passengers per year initially, and up to 10 million passengers eventually.

The runway reaches 3,300 meters in length and 45 meters in width. The large capacity of the airport makes it capable of accommodating wide-bodied aircraft, including the Boeing 777, Boeing 787, Airbus A330 and Airbus A350. The aircraft transfer route spans 306 meters x 32 meters and 438 meters x 32 meters.

== Terminal ==
The total area of the airport terminal building is 18,224 square meters. In the initial phase, the Dhoho Airport terminal can accommodate 1.5 million passengers per year. In the next development phase, the annual passenger capacity will increase to 4.5 million people, gradually rising to reach 10 million people.

== Airlines and destinations ==
Airlines	Destinations
Citilink	Seasonal: Jeddah
Super Air Jet	Jakarta–Soekarno-Hatta

== See also ==
- Kediri (city)
- Blitar
