= Aviation history of Samarinda =

The aviation story of Samarinda began during Japanese occupation. The Japanese army acquired a land in Temindung for use as a small airfield, the land originally named Temindung which explains the name of the airport.

The second airport in Samarinda, Borneo, was located at Mahakam. In 1949, KLM set a new mark in Samarinda aviation history. The airline successfully took off at the airport, operated by its Catalina amphibious aeroplanes. They were the first aeroplane that took off from Samarinda.

In 1950, Shell plc operated weekly flight from Balikpapan to Samarinda. On 17 September 1950, the first president of Indonesia Sukarno, took off from the airport on his first visit to Samarinda.

== Temindung and Sungai Siring ==
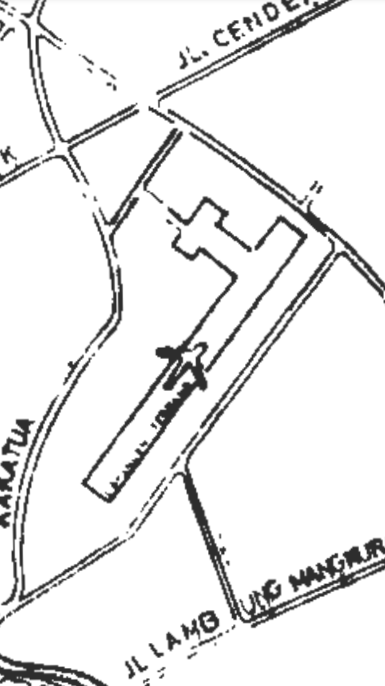
Map of Temindung in the 1980s

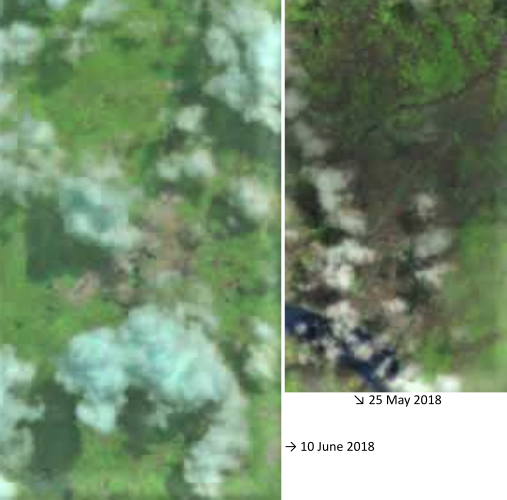
Satellite view of the new airport (left) and Temindung (right) in 2018

In 1973, the story of Temindung expansion began. The location of Temindung belonged to Pertamina (Pelita Air Service) and the government, who owned the land. It became a small airport for the government.

In 1974 the passenger terminal was completed, and Temindung became a domestic airport, renamed Samarinda Airport. But it remains popularly known as Temindung Airport.

At that time, the airlines operating from the airport were:

- Georgia P. I.
- MAF Borneo
- IAT
- Bouraq Indonesia Airlines
- Avedeco
- ATA Borneo
- Merpati Nusantara Airlines
- Pelita Air

Temindung was taking on more flights than it could handle, and buildings had spread to within spitting distance of the runway. It was decided to look for a new area, which is away from the congested Samarinda central area. In 2005, construction of the brand new airport began at Sungai Siring, 16 km to the north of Temindung.

At 15:36 on May 23, 2018, the city's main air hub closed its doors, moving services to the new Samarinda International Airport in the morning of the following day, characterised by wingspanned curve roof and solar-powered rooftops. In 2019, Samarinda International Airport handled some 1 million travellers.
