= Dirgantara Air Service =

IATA	ICAO	Call sign
AW	DIR	DIRGANTARA
- Founded: 1971
- Ceased operations: 2009
- Hubs: Halim Perdanakusuma International Airport; Temindung Airport
- Fleet size: 15 (at closure)
- Headquarters: Jakarta, Indonesia

Dirgantara Air Service was an airline based in Jakarta, Indonesia. It operated scheduled domestic services, as well as charters and aerial work. Its main bases were Halim Perdanakusuma International Airport, Jakarta, Samarinda Airport, Syamsudin Noor Airport, Banjarmasin and Supadio Airport, Pontianak. Dirgantara Air Service is not listed in any category by Indonesian Civil Aviation Authority for airline safety quality.

Since 2008, Dirgantara Air Service operation licence is revoked and on March 5, 2013, Central Jakarta Commercial Court declared the company in Bankruptcy.

== History ==
The airline was established and started operations in 1971. It was owned by UDI Upaya Foundation (40%), its employees (30%) and others (40%). At March 2007, it had 232 employees.

In March 2007 Dirgantara Air Service was rated as "holding potential for threatening safety of aviation" by a survey of the Indonesian Transport Ministry, forcing the airline to ground three of its aircraft. Other reports state that Dirgantara Air Service has been grounded.

In 2009, Dirgantara Air Service was discontinued.

== Destinations ==
Dirgantara Air Service operated scheduled services to the following domestic destinations in January 2005: Balikpapan, Banjarmasin, Berau, Datadawai, Ketapang, Long Apung, Long Bawan, Nunukan, Pangkalan Bun, Pontianak, Putussibau, Samarinda (Temindung Airport^{[Hub]}), Sampit, Sintang, Tanjung, Tanjung Selor and Tarakan.

== Fleet ==
Upon closure, the Dirgantara Air Service fleet included the following aircraft:

- 2 ATR 42-300

Further aircraft included:

- 6 Britten-Norman BN2A Islander
- 2 Indonesian Aerospace 212-100
- 6 Indonesian Aerospace 212-200

== Accidents and incidents ==
- On 25 April 1994, an Britten-Norman Islander registered as PK-ZAA struck Mount Saran while on descent to Nanga Pinoh Airport in poor weather. 10 out of 11 occupants were killed in the accident.
- On 7 December 1996, a CASA 212 registered as PK-VSO, operating as Dirgantara Air Service Flight 5940, crashes into residential area shortly after takeoff from Banjarmasin Airport in South Kalimantan. 16 out of 17 occupants alongside 2 bystanders were killed in the accident.
- On 18 November 2000, a Britten Norman BN2A Islander, registered as PK-VIY, operating as Dirgantara Air Service Flight 3130, crashes into the forest shortly after takeoff from Datah Dawai Airport, East Kalimantan. No one was killed in the accident, but all 18 people on board were injured, 11 of them were seriously injured. Multiple issues on the airport, crews, and security causes the crash.
- On 7 November 2002, a Britten-Norman Islander registered as PK-VIZ crashed shortly after takeoff from Juwata Airport after the pilot encountered engine problems and attempted to return. 7 out of 10 occupants were killed in the accident.
- On 26 February 2008, a CASA 212-200 with a registration code of PK-VSE went missing over the jungle of Borneo while conducting a chartered cargo flight from Tarakan Airport, Tarakan to Long Apung Airport. The plane was carrying 3 people. Search and rescue team found the wreckage of the plane in the following hours. All on board were killed. Before it went missing, the plane sent a distress signal to nearby aircraft. The crash was categorized as CFIT.
