= Dirgantara Air Service Flight 5940 =

1996 aviation accident

Coordinates: 2°30′S 115°30′E

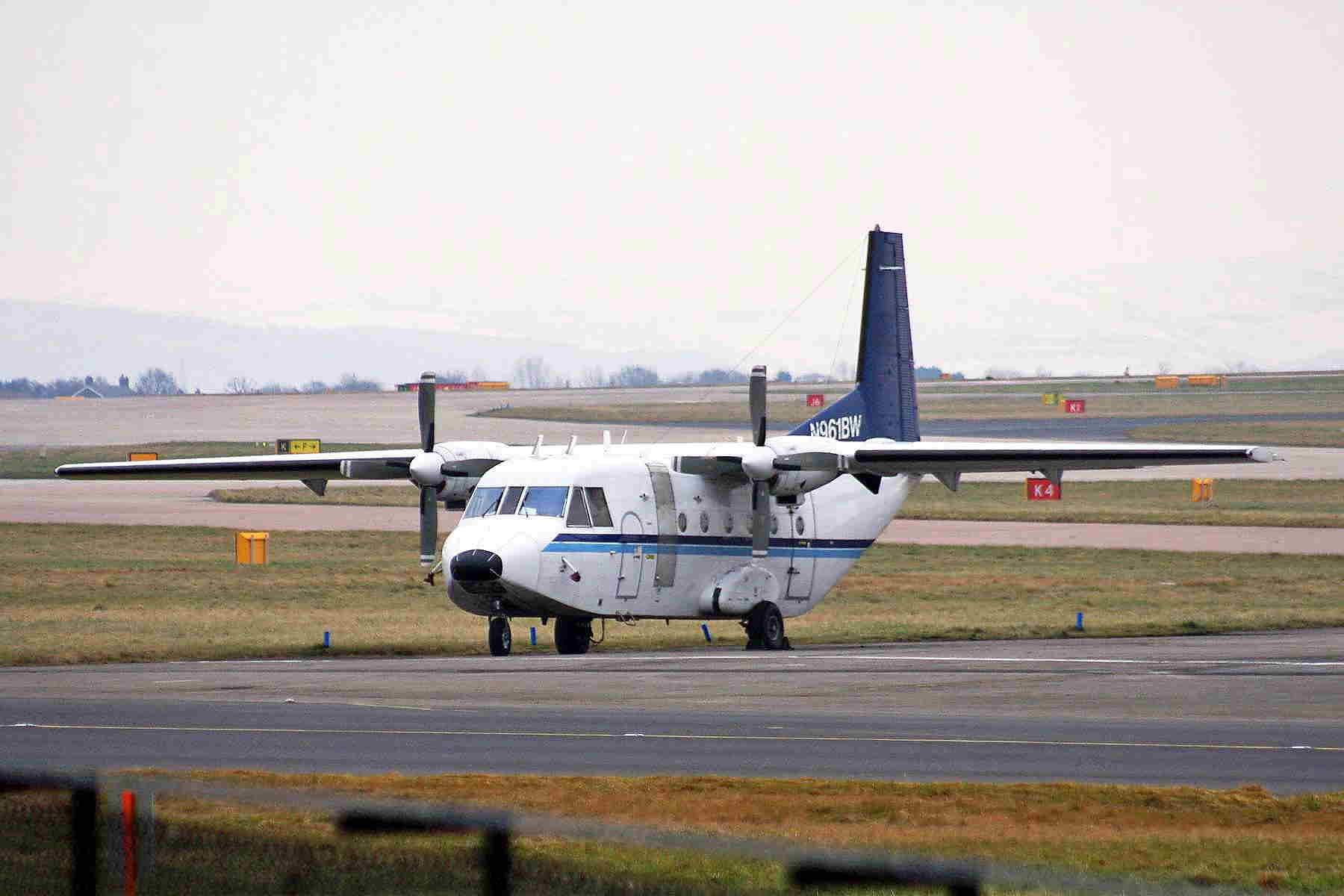
- A CASA C-212 Aviocar, the same type of the accident aircraft

Accident
- Date: 7 December 1996
- Summary: EFTO
- Site: Near Syamsudin Noor International Airport, Banjarmasin, South Kalimantan, Indonesia
- Total fatalities: 18
- Total injuries: 3

Aircraft
- Aircraft type: CASA C-212 Aviocar
- Operator: Dirgantara Air Service
- IATA flight No.: AW5940
- ICAO flight No.: DIR5940
- Call sign: DIRGANTARA 5940
- Registration: PK-VSO
- Flight origin: Syamsudin Noor International Airport, Banjarmasin, Indonesia
- Destination: H. Asan Airport, Sampit, Indonesia
- Passengers: 15
- Crew: 2
- Fatalities: 16
- Injuries: 1
- Survivors: 1

Ground casualties
- Ground fatalities: 2
- Ground injuries: 2

Dirgantara Air Service Flight 5940 was an Indonesian domestic scheduled passenger flight, operated by military-owned airline Dirgantara Air Service, from South Kalimantan's provincial capital of Banjarmasin to Sampit, the capital of the East Kotawaringin Regency. On 7 December 1996, a CASA C-212 Aviocar registered as PK-VSO crashed into a gas plant shortly after takeoff from Syamsudin Noor International Airport. 17 people, including one on the ground, died at the scene, a 12-year-old child died on the way to the hospital, and a worker at the gas plant died at the hospital. One passenger, identified as 40-year-old Irianto, was the only survivor. The official investigation determined that the crew lost control of the plane after its right engine malfunctioned.

== Flight ==
The flight took off from Syamsudin Noor International Airport around 15:30 local time with 15 passengers and 2 crew members and was heading to Sampit, a city known for its strategic location and economy in South Kalimantan. The aircraft was piloted by Captain Herybert and was co-piloted by First Officer Sofyan Noor. Approximately one minute after takeoff, the right engine malfunctioned. The crew then reported to the tower, but instead of reporting the malfunctioning engine, the crew accidentally reported the other engine was working normally. The crew then stated that they would "return to base", but whilst making an emergency landing they lost control of the aircraft and it crashed through the rooftops of PT. Barox Utama Jaya, a factory producing oxygen tanks and acetylene. The crash site was located 3 km (1.9 mi) from the airport.

13 passengers and both crew members were killed. A gas plant worker was also killed and 3 others were injured due to the subsequent explosions. Two passengers of Flight 5940, identified as 40-year old Irianto and 12-year old Rusdiana survived the impact. Both were rushed to nearby hospitals. Rusdiana however succumbed to her injuries while on the way to the hospital. A worker who initially survived the crash in critical injuries, died due to the severity of his injuries.

== Passengers and crew ==
The aircraft was carrying 15 passengers, including a 12-year-old child, and 2 crew members. Little is known about the crew's flying experience. The bodies were removed to Syamsudin Noor Hospital in Banjarmasin. The repatriation and identification progress were observed by the then South Kalimantan Governor, Gusti Hanan Aman. The sole survivor was a 40-year-old man identified by authorities as Irianto. He suffered bone fractures and facial injuries and underwent a 4-hour surgery in Dr. Soeharsono Military Hospital. The surgery was conducted by Lieutenant Colonel Dr. Dedi Zamhuri from the nearby Indonesian Air Force Military Hospital.

== Investigation ==
Immediately after the crash, the Indonesian Ministry of Transportation appointed the NTSC to conduct an investigation into the cause of the crash. As the plane was a produced both by the Indonesian IPTN and the Spanish CASA, they expected the Spanish investigation team to join and assist the NTSC.

According to the ATC worker in Syamsudin Noor Airport, Captain Herybert had announced the engine failure and had stated his intentions to make an emergency landing. According to the Indonesian Transportation Minister, Haryanto Dhanutirto, the procedure the crew took was correct, and this claim was also correct. Observation on the crash site revealed that the plane's wreckage was heading towards the airport, meaning that the crew did attempt to return to the airport.

=== Response ===
In response to the crash, the Governor of South Kalimantan visited the survivor and the injured shortly after hearing the news. Indonesian Minister of Transportation Haryanto Dhanutirto visited the crash site. He, alongside the South Kalimantan Governor, made a condolence statement to the families affected by the crash. Haryanto later added that the local government should make a regulation on industrial location around the airport and its risks.

The insurance company told the media that there would be compensation for each passengers and crew members at Rp 40 million each person. They stated that they would only compensate the surviving passenger's hospital bill, up to a maximum of Rp 10 million. The insurance company, however, would not compensate the victims on the ground.

The General Manager of PT. Barox Utama Jaya, Ranius, stated that he demanded a compensation from the airliner. He stated that his company suffered a Rp 500 million loss due to the crash, specifically a loss of a Fuso truck, an electrical generator, and the shutdown of the factory for three consecutive days. He later added that he would file a lawsuit if the airliner dismissed his demands.

=== Controversy ===
The CASA C-212 Aviocar was produced by the Spanish CASA and the Indonesian IPTN. The head of IPTN Bacharuddin Jusuf Habibie claimed that the plane was "tough" in its class. For example, he noted the crash of a CASA C-212 in 1991 in Tihengo Mountain when the plane flew onto a tree and became stuck. Habibie stated that the plane didn't suffer any substantial damage. The same year a Pelita Air Service CASA C-212 crashed into the sea off Lampung. This crash later caused a public debate on the worthiness of the plane.

== See also ==
- Merpati Nusantara Airlines Flight 5601, a crash in Garut which caused similar public outcry on Indonesian-made aircraft
- Air Algérie Flight 6289, similar crash that was caused by engine failure on take-off
- List of aviation accidents and incidents with a sole survivor
