= 3130 =

3130 may refer to:

- A.D. 3130, a year in the 4th millennium CE
- 3130 BC, a year in the 4th millennium BCE
- 3130, a number in the 3000 (number) range

== Places ==
- 3130 Hillary, an asteroid in the Asteroid Belt, the 3130th asteroid registered
- Hawaii Route 3130, a state highway
- Louisiana Highway 3130, a state highway
- Texas Ranch to Market Road 3130, a state highway

== Other uses ==
- Dirgantara Air Service Flight 3130, a 2000 Indonesian crash with no deaths
