= Kaltim Airlines =

Airline based in Samarinda, Indonesia

IATA	ICAO	Call sign
—	—	KALTIMAIR
- Founded: 17 August 2011
- Ceased operations: 2013
- Hubs: Samarinda International Airport
- Fleet size: 3
- Destinations: 4
- Parent company: Kaltim Aviation
- Headquarters: Registered office: Plaza Mulia, Samarinda; Head office: Aji Pangeran Tumenggung Pranoto International Airport, Sungai Siring, Samarinda
- Key people: Marthin Billa (chairman)
- Website: www.kaltimair.org

Kaltim Airlines was an airline in Samarinda, East Kalimantan, Indonesia with its head office located at Samarinda International Airport. The airline's operations included scheduled passenger and cargo services to four destinations, with a fleet of regional aircraft consisting of British Aerospace 146 and Cessna C208 aircraft. The airline was founded on 17 August 2011 by Awang F. Ishak and Sabri Ramdhani. The airline ceased all operations in 2013.

== Destinations ==
Hub
Future
Cargo only
Passenger + cargo
Terminated destinations

City	Country	IATA	ICAO	Airport
Balikpapan	Indonesia	BPN	WALL	Sultan Aji Muhammad Sulaiman Airport
Berau	Indonesia	BEJ	WALK	Kalimarau Airport
Jakarta	Indonesia	CGK	WIII	Soekarno–Hatta International Airport
Samarinda		SRI	WALS	Samarinda Airport

== Fleet ==
=== Current ===
Kaltim Airlines Passenger fleet
Aircraft	In service	Orders	Passengers
British Aerospace 146	1	—	72
Cessna C208	2	—	12
Total	3		
