= H. Asan Airport =

H. Asan Airport Bandar Udara H. Asan
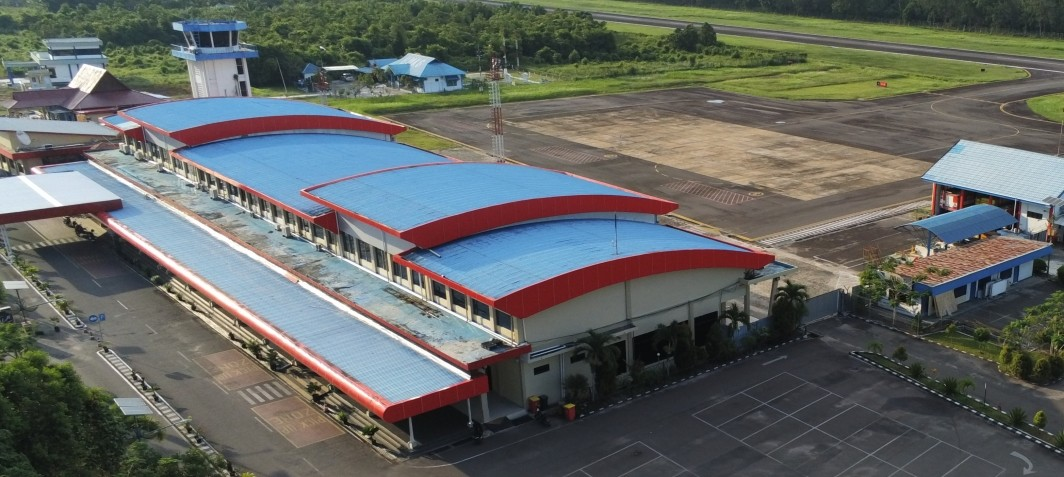
- IATA: SMQ; ICAO: WAGS

Summary
- Airport type: Public
- Owner: Government of Indonesia
- Operator: Directorate General of Civil Aviation
- Serves: Sampit
- Location: Sampit, East Kotawaringin Regency, Central Kalimantan, Indonesia
- Time zone: WIB (UTC+07:00)
- Elevation AMSL: 50 ft (15 m)
- Coordinates: 02°29′57″S 112°58′30″E
- Website: sampitairport.com

Map
- Location of airport in Indonesia

Runways
Direction	Length		Surface
Direction	ft	m	Surface
13/31	6,759	2,060	Asphalt

Statistics (2024)
- Passengers: 77,604 (▲14.1%)
- Cargo (tonnes): 617(▲14.3%)
- Aircraft movements: 924 (▼6.8%)
- Source: DGCA

H. Asan Airport (IATA: SMQ, ICAO: WAGS) is a domestic airport serving the town of Sampit, the capital of East Kotawaringin Regency in Central Kalimantan, Indonesia. Located approximately 6 kilometers northeast of the town center, along the left bank of the Mentaya River, it serves as the primary gateway to Sampit and the surrounding East Kotawaringin Regency. The airport is named after Haji Asan, a local resident who formerly owned the land and donated it to the government for airport development. Air traffic at H. Asan Airport remains limited. As of August 2026, three airlines operate scheduled services to Sampit. NAM Air, a subsidiary of the Sriwijaya Air Group, operates flights connecting Sampit with major Indonesian cities, including Jakarta, Semarang, and Surabaya. Super Air Jet operates flights to Jakarta, while Wings Air operates flights to Surabaya; both airlines are part of the Lion Air Group.

== History ==
=== Construction and early history ===
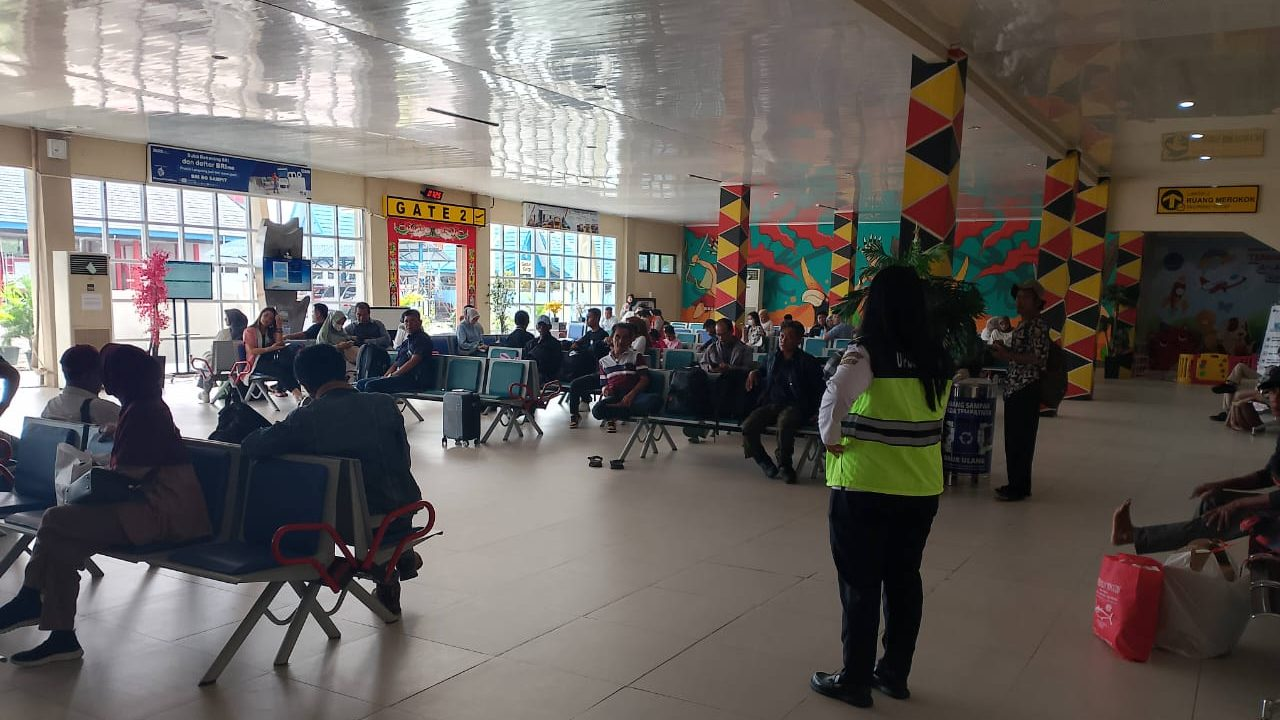
Boarding gate

Aviation activity in the town of Sampit began in 1959–1960 with round-trip flights between Banjarmasin and Sampit operated by the Indonesian Air Force using the Grumman HU-16 Albatross amphibious aircraft. Landings were carried out on the Mentaya River, and the aircraft would dock at a pier owned by the East Kotawaringin regency government, located in front of the regent’s residence—an area that is now part of the Sampit Port. These flights were part of a humanitarian mission initiated by the government to establish air bridges into remote and isolated areas, particularly in Central Kalimantan. However, due to the limited availability of aircraft, the operation proved difficult to sustain and was eventually discontinued after only two years.

On 31 August 1960, a local resident named Haji Asan donated his land to the East Kotawaringin government for the construction of an airport in Sampit. The donated area measured 1,500 by 110 meters. Haji Asan, a former freedom fighter during the Indonesian National Revolution, requested no compensation for the land. In return, the government promised that his family would be given the opportunity to work at the airport without having to undergo any selection process. In recognition of his selfless contribution, the airport was named in his honor. Shortly thereafter, construction of the airport began under the direction of the local government. Initially, the facility consisted only of a 600-meter grass runway. Once operational, Merpati Nusantara Airlines launched a route between Banjarmasin and Sampit using a Pilatus PC-12 and a de Havilland Canada DHC-3 Otter. However, due to limited aircraft availability, the service was short-lived and discontinued after only a few years.

After Merpati Nusantara Airlines ceased its services to the airport, the facility was left unused and became overgrown for several years. In 1970, flight operations resumed with Dirgantara Air Service using Britten-Norman BN-2 Islander aircraft. Air traffic experienced significant growth during the 1980s and early 1990s. However, this upward trend was soon challenged by the construction of new roads connecting Sampit to Palangkaraya and Pangkalan Bun, which makes land transportation more convenient, as well as the introduction of new Pelni-operated shipping routes to Sampit. The decline in air travel demand was further compounded by the 1997 Asian Financial Crisis.

=== Contemporary history ===
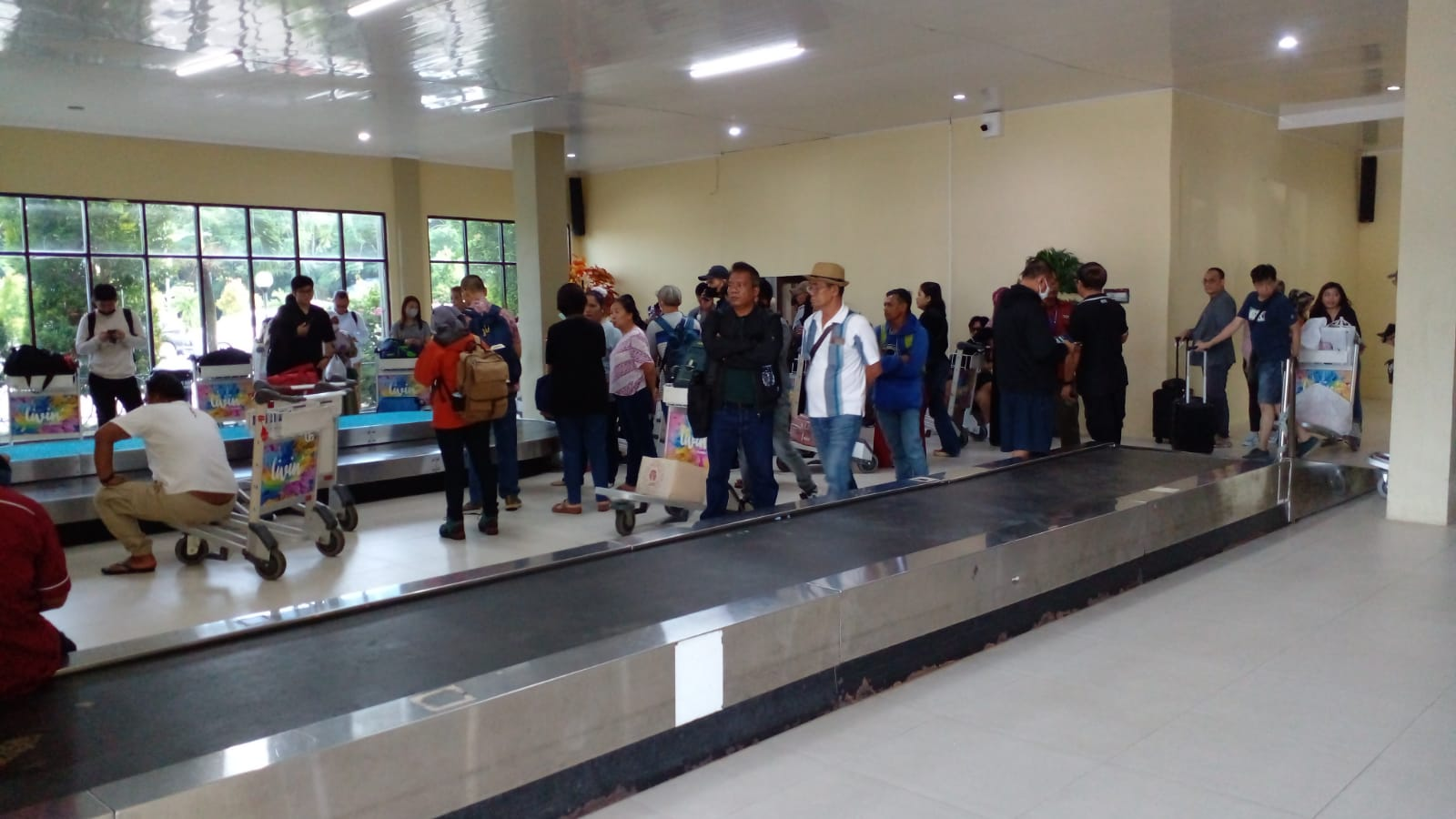
Baggage claim area

In the early 2000s, the airport underwent further upgrades, including a runway extension to accommodate larger aircraft such as the ATR-72 and Boeing 737-500. Since 2006, the airport has been capable of accommodating Fokker F27 aircraft and similar types. By the end of 2007, it was able to handle Boeing 737-200 aircraft. In response to strong demand, Merpati Nusantara Airlines introduced a Surabaya–Sampit–Surabaya route, with flights subsidized by the regional government (APBD), operating four times a week on Mondays, Tuesdays, Thursdays, and Saturdays. This was followed by Kartika Airlines, which operated charter flights between Jakarta and Sampit three times a week. Since early 2009, the East Kotawaringin Regency Government invested Rp25 billion in Merpati Nusantara Airlines under a profit-sharing arrangement. The Fokker 100 aircraft used for the service officially carried the East Kotawaringin Regency Government's logo and operated the Surabaya–Sampit–Jakarta round-trip route four times a week. At the same year, Kalstar Aviation introduced a multi-leg route connecting Banjarmasin, Sampit, Pangkalan Bun, Ketapang, and Pontianak using ATR-42 aircraft, with daily service. However, both routes were eventually discontinued as the airlines ceased operations one after another in the following years.

The airport currently faces challenges related to declining airline service. At present, it can only accommodate aircraft up to the size of a Boeing 737-500—the same model used by the NAM Air, the sole airline currently operating flights to Sampit. However, the Boeing 737-500 is an aging aircraft that is gradually being phased out of commercial fleets. As the availability of this model continues to diminish, there is an increasing risk that airlines may cease operations to Sampit altogether unless the airport is upgraded to support newer aircraft types.

== Facilities and development ==
The airport has a single passenger terminal covering 2,024 square meters, alongside a 400-square-meter cargo terminal located adjacent to it. On the airside, the airport features two taxiways, each measuring 75 by 23 meters, a runway measuring 2,060 by 30 meters, and a single apron measuring 160 by 50 meters.

As of 2024, the airport has a single runway measuring 2,060 meters in length and 30 meters in width, limiting operations to aircraft no larger than the Boeing 737-500. To address this limitation, the East Kotawaringin government launched a runway upgrade project that includes extending the runway by 200 meters—bringing the total length to 2,260 meters—and widening it to 45 meters. The project also involves strengthening the runway pavement to accommodate larger and more modern aircraft, such as the Boeing 737 Next Generation and the Airbus A320. Construction is currently in the land-clearing phase, with approximately 8 hectares of land expected to be cleared to support the expansion. In the next phase of development, the runway is planned to be further extended to 2,550 meters to accommodate even larger aircraft. This phase will also include the expansion of the airport’s apron, the construction of firefighting and emergency response facilities, and the enlargement of the passenger terminal. The entire development is expected to be completed by 2027.

Due to limited available land for future expansion, there have been proposals to relocate the airport. One proposed site is the Pantai Ujung Pandaran area in Teluk Sampit District, which is considered strategic due to its proximity to the sea, lower risk of smog from forest fires, and relatively uninhabited land, making clearance easier. However, the East Kotawaringin government has stated that relocation is not a top priority at this time due to budgetary constraints. Instead, efforts are currently focused on optimizing and upgrading the existing airport facilities.

== Airlines and destinations ==
Airlines	Destinations
NAM Air	Semarang, Surabaya
Super Air Jet	Jakarta–Soekarno-Hatta
Wings Air	Surabaya

== Statistics ==
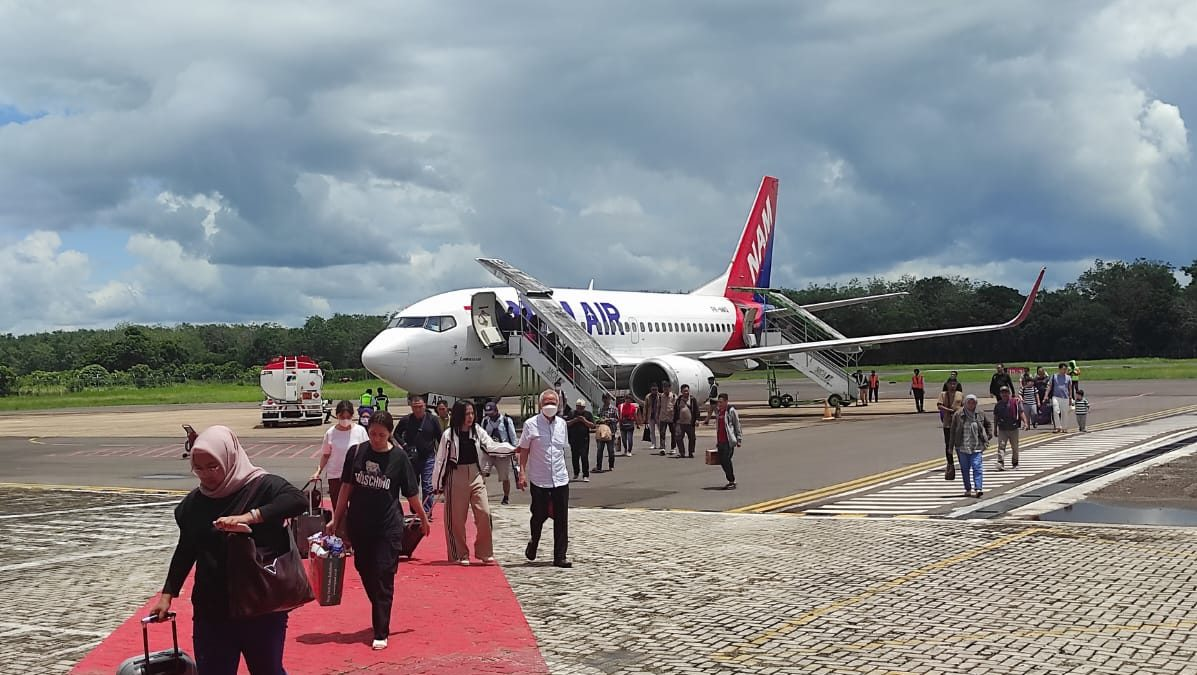
Apron view of the airport, with a NAM Air Boeing 737-500 on standby

Annual passenger numbers and aircraft statistics
Year	Passengers handled	Passenger % change	Cargo (tonnes)	Cargo % change	Aircraft movements	Aircraft % change
2006	39,745	Steady	156	Steady	1,745	Steady
2007	17,356	▼56.3	40	▼74.4	519	▼70.3
2008	49,294	▲184.0	255	▲537.5	799	▲53.9
2009	92,584	▲87.8	238	▼6.7	2,202	▲175.6
2010	139,475	▲50.6	277	▲16.4	2,412	▲9.5
2011	160,936	▲15.4	543	▲96.0	3,344	▲38.6
2012	180,625	▲12.2	705	▲29.8	3,320	▼0.7
2013	236,848	▲31.1	1,260	▲78.7	4,135	▲24.5
2014	230,895	▼2.5	1,088	▼13.7	3,836	▼7.2
2015	225,514	▼2.3	1,612	▲48.2	3,743	▼2.4
2016	213,482	▼5.3	1,385	▼14.1	3,794	▲1.4
2017	177,344	▼16.9	1,218	▼12.1	2,590	▼31.7
2018	417,440	▲135.4	3,098	▲154.4	5,688	▲119.7
2019	244,335	▼41.5	1,308	▼57.8	4,158	▼26.9
2020	98,765	▼59.6	893	▼31.7	1,824	▼56.1
2021	60,373	▼38.9	468	▼47.6	1,234	▼32.3
2022	116,047	▲92.2	999	▲113.5	1,942	▲57.4
2023	68,029	▼41.4	540	▼45.9	991	▼48.0
2024	77,604	▲14.1	617	▲14.3	924	▼6.8
^{Source: DGCA, BPS}

== Accidents and incidents ==
- On 3 September 1991, a Dirgantara Air Service Britten-Norman BN-2 Islander operating a flight from Sampit to Palangkaraya experienced an engine failure during takeoff from Sampit. The pilot attempted to return to the airport by making a left turn, but the aircraft lost altitude and crashed into the Mentaya River. Of the 10 people on board, three were killed.
- On 25 October 1991, a Bali Air Britten-Norman Trislander operating a flight from Palangkaraya to Sampit went missing after performing a go-around near Sampit due to poor weather conditions. The aircraft was unable to land and subsequently disappeared from radar. Despite extensive search efforts, the wreckage was never located, and all 17 occupants are presumed dead.
