= Dirgantara Air Service Flight 3130 =

Aviation accident in 2000

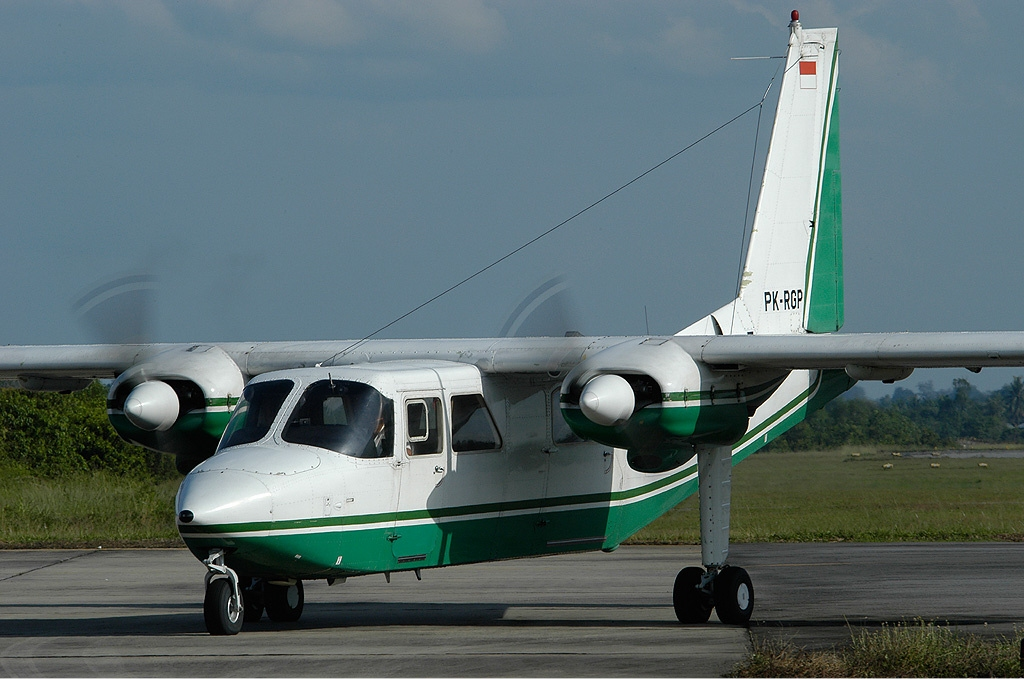
- An Indonesian registered Britten Norman Islander, similar to the crashed aircraft

Accident
- Date: 18 November 2000
- Summary: Loss of control due to overloading and pilot error
- Site: Near Datah Dawai Airport, Long Panhangai District, Malinau Regency, East Kalimantan, Indonesia

Aircraft
- Aircraft type: Britten Norman BN-2 Islander
- Operator: Dirgantara Air Service
- IATA flight No.: AW3130
- ICAO flight No.: DIR3130
- Call sign: DIRGANTARA 3130
- Registration: PK-VIY
- Flight origin: Datah Dawai Airport, Mahakam Ulu Regency, Indonesia
- Destination: Samarinda Temindung Airport, Samarinda, Indonesia
- Passengers: 17 (including 2 infants and a five-month pregnant woman)
- Crew: 1
- Fatalities: 0
- Injuries: 18
- Survivors: 18

Dirgantara Air Service Flight 3130 (DIR3130/AW3130) was a scheduled domestic passenger flight operated by Dirgantara Air Service from Datah Dawai Airport, Malinau Regency, East Kalimantan to its provincial capital's airport, Samarinda Temindung Airport, Samarinda, East Kalimantan. On 18 November 2000, the aircraft conducting the flight, a Britten Norman Islander BN-2 sheared tree tops and crashed onto the forest near the airport shortly after takeoff. Search and rescue team immediately found the wreckage of Flight 3130 and the survivors. No one was killed in the crash, but all 18 people on board were injured in the crash; 11 of them were seriously hurt.

The final report, published by the National Transportation Safety Committee, concluded that the crash was caused due to multiple factors, which were pilot error, overloading, and lack of safety in the airport (bribery). The wrong perception by the pilot, added with the plane overloading that was caused by bribery, subsequently causing the plane to crash. The airline ceased operations in 2009 and officially went bankrupt in 2013.

== Background ==
The aircraft involved in the crash was a Britten Norman Islander BN-2, registered in Indonesia as PK-VIY. Manufactured in 1981 in United Kingdom, it had accrued a total cycle of 22,336 hours. It had one crew seat and a total of 9 passenger seats. It had an airworthiness certificate published on 27 September 2000. All passengers and crew on board were Indonesian citizen. The one and only crew, Captain Abdul Hayi, had accrued a total flying hours of 7,560.

The aerodrome is owned by the local government and used for pioneer flight operations. The coordinates are 00 47 North, 114 34 East. The elevation is not officially published, only measured from the aircraft altimeter, which is about 650 ft above sea level. The runway designation is 02 and 20. The length of the runway is 750 meter with width of 23 meter. A stopway of 30 meter is provided for runway 02. The runway surface is asphalt and its strength can accommodate up to CASA 212 aircraft. It has an apron, taxiway, but a tower building is not available since the aerodrome is a non-controlled aerodrome. The runway is not equipped with landing direction indicators and, due to local prevailing surface winds at most of the time, the preferred takeoff and landing direction is runway 02. A significant obstacle is the hilly forest in the northerly direction of the extension of runway 02. The first obstacle is about 200 feet high above runway elevation located about 533.3 meters from the end of runway 02, and the second obstacle is about 500 feet above runway elevation 1.262,9 meters from the end of runway 02. Runway slope inclination is 3% from direction of runway 02.

== Accident ==
The Britten Norman Islander took off at 10:51 local time, carrying a total of 17 passengers, including 2 infants and a 5-month-pregnant woman, and 1 crew member on board. Shortly after takeoff, the airport radio operator noticed that the aircraft disappeared behind the forest. The aircraft contacted the first tree and started to veering to the left. It then hit another tree and began zigzagging. The aircraft then contacted the third tree and started to lose control. The landing gear then struck the last contacted tree and then it crashed upside down onto the forest floor. Both wings were ripped off from the fuselage, with fuels leaking from the right wing tip. This created a dangerous post-impact fire risk, as the soil type in Borneo was often flammable.

A search and rescue party was quickly assembled by Datah Dawai Airport authorities shortly after the crash. The wreckage was eventually found 2 kilometers from the airport. All 18 people on board, including 2 infants and a 5-month pregnant woman, were injured with 11 of them were seriously hurt. The crew of the aircraft, identified as Captain Abdul Hayi, had to be transported to Jakarta due to broken legs. The injured were taken to local hospital and the Wahab Sjachrani Civic Hospital in Samarinda. The aircraft was a total loss, with the front section of the aircraft "totally wrecked". The rudder and the vertical stabilizers were found 7 meters from the main wreckage. The fuselage was crushed and bent severely. Passengers and crews initially trapped inside the wreckage. The seats inside the aircraft had to thrown out from the aircraft in order to evacuate the survivors.

== Investigation ==
=== Initial examination ===
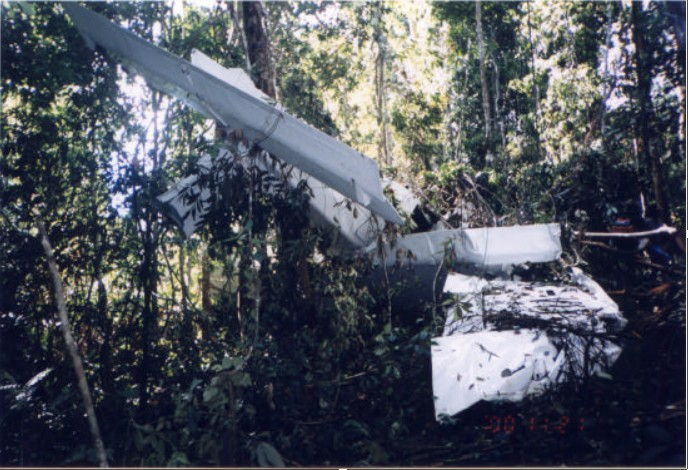
Wreckage of PK-VIY after the crash. The severely crushed fuselage could be seen in the photo.

Investigators inspected the wreckage of Flight 3130 and found that there was not a single indication of a rotation on the propeller during the crash. Further inspection on the wreckage revealed that the propeller, mixture and throttle levers were all the way back. This indicated that the engine might have not running at the time of the crash. The engine could have been shut down by Captain Abdul. There are three possibilities that caused the shutdown; those are engine fire, engine failure, or an emergency procedure.

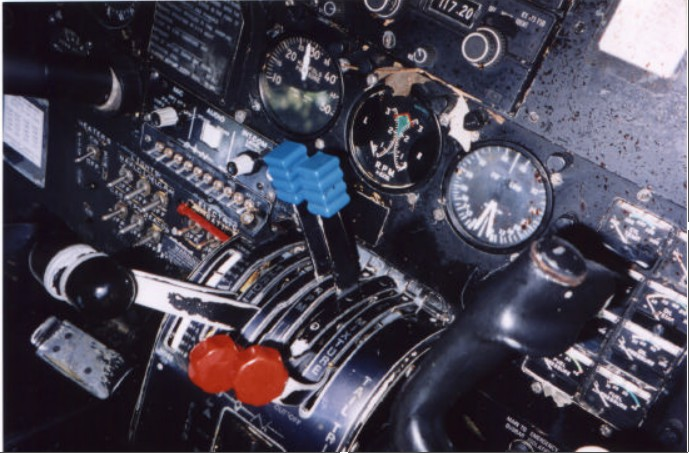
The lever setting found by investigators on Flight 3130

The propellers didn't have any indications of an engine fire. The propellers were found in fine pitch and unfeathered position, which indicating an improper engine shutdown procedure. The wreckage indicated that the propeller levers position was not caused by the impact. All the levers on the pedestal were bent to the left due to impact from the right side. It is possible that Captain Abdul may not have time to perform a proper engine shutdown procedure. This, and the fact that the settings for both engines were the same indicate that a single engine failure did not occur. One sparkplugs from each cylinder was examined. The plugs were dry and clean indicating there were no signs of combustion failure.

Investigators interviewed the survivors. Based on survivors' statements, they claimed that the aircraft was handling more passengers than usual. The usual number of passengers was 9, as the maximum number of passenger seats are 9. While at the time, it reached 17. A row of seat that usually was occupied by 2 people had to be cramped up to 4 people, causing most of the passengers to not wear their seatbelts. These, causing the high number of injuries. During the initial climb, the aircraft didn't gain height and subsequently crashed. Survivors blamed overloading for the cause of the accident. An analysis on the weight and balance of Flight 3130 was conducted. Dirgantara Air Service's Standard Operating Procedures stated that the maximum takeoff payload from Datah Dawai was limited to 496 kilograms, while the actual takeoff payload was 913.5 kg, exceeding the company standards by 417.5 kg, or by 84% of the allowed payload weight. Britten Norman issued the maximum takeoff weight (for Datah Dawai Airport elevation, which is 650 ft) is 6.300 lbs or 2.860 kg. The aircraft takeoff weight at Datah Dawai was 6.572 kilograms, exceeded manufacturer maximum takeoff weight by 272 lbs or 4.32%. However, Dirgantara Air Service argued from the manual that the maximum takeoff weight is 6.600 lbs. The center of gravity calculated is still inside the moment flight envelope, but close to the aft limit of the envelope. The aircraft takeoff trim was set to near −1, meaning that the center of gravity was slightly aft.

Calculation of the flight performance indicated that with a reported 6.007 lbs aircraft weight (allowable for Datah Dawai according to the airline's SOP) and two engines operation, the aircraft could climb as high as 200 ft height from the runway elevation at 533.3 meter range (first segment climb). The aircraft should be able to reach 500 ft at 1.261 meters range (second segment climb). This performance capability will assure a safe clearance from existing obstacles. Using a linearized performance model, applying the actual weight of 6.572 lbs, the net gradient climb was calculated to be 12.6%. A correction factor applied to the linearized model resulting in an estimated climb gradient of 11%. With this climb gradient the aircraft can only reach 176 ft at 533.3m range, instead of the required 200 ft. At 176 ft above airport ground level, the aircraft height above the top of the trees was 11 ft (marginal).

=== Flight sequence analysis ===
The aircraft performed a takeoff with dual engine operations and rotated at a speed of 70 knots. Based on interviews, the moment the aircraft took off from Datah Dawai, the aircraft seems to not have gained any height, whether from downdraft, engine failure, or both. Noticing that the aircraft didn't gain height, Captain Abdul decided to turn back to the airport and rolled the aircraft to the left in order to avoid high trees. This maneuver, turning back to the airport by veering to the left, was not based on published procedures or visual track charts, as there were not available for departures from runway 02. The investigation also did not find any published information on emergency return-to-base maneuvers. Realizing that the aircraft continued to lose altitude, Captain Abdul prepared for an emergency landing. There was literally no time to conduct a proper emergency procedure, as the aircraft continued to fall with a sharp nose-down pitch.

For a Datah Dawai departure, the first flight segment covers a 1,600 ft range, and the aircraft should have gained 200 ft altitude from runway. The flight, however, did only reach an altitude of 150 ft from the runway elevation at a range of 6.000 ft. This evidence proved that Flight 3130 was overloaded. An interview with Captain Abdul revealed that he had a habit of taking off from Datah Dawai at 70 knots, faster than the aircraft recommended take-off speed of 55–60 knots. He mentioned that doing so would improve his obstacle-clearance performance. The mindset/perception Captain Abdul received is incorrect, as because if the aircraft took off at 70 knots, the time between the aircraft and the obstacles (high ground and trees) became smaller. Because the time between the aircraft and the obstacles became smaller, the aircraft should climb at a higher climb rate. Because it was overloaded, the aircraft did climb, but its speed would decrease. After clearing the obstacle, the aircraft would have lost so much speed that it could no longer gain any height. This combination caused Flight 3130 to stall.

=== Criminality ===
Dirgantara Air Service claimed that there were only 9 passengers aboard the plane. Examination of the load manifest and passenger tickets, along with interviews with the passengers, showed that only 12 of the 18 passengers have valid tickets. Passengers' weight were not measured correctly at Datah Dawai. The fact that Captain Abdul or the ground crew didn't object with the possible overloading indicates that there was a common practice or understanding on making extra-illegal profits from this practice. Most probably, such practice has been done before.

The investigation found that the crew of Dirgantara Air Service has never filled out a flight clearance for all its operations from Samarinda. This is a violation of the Civil Aviation Safety Regulations (CASR). The airport briefing office should sign the flight clearance and therefore supervise the process. In Pioneer Flight operations, the local government requires the operator to hire local businesses/human resources in the operation, such as for the ticket agents, suppliers, etc. Dirgantara Air Service Area Manager in Samarinda mentioned that in many cases, the local personnel are not qualified or do not have the right to work in airline operation, but have to be hired anyway. This might influence the safety level of the operation. The investigation found that there were two load manifests. The original manifest, obtained by the police at Tenggarong District and was suspected to be from Datah Dawai, listed seven adults, one child, and one infant with several items of baggage. The second manifest, numbered 012905, is suspected to have been made in Samarinda. The number on the top right of the document is pasted over, obviously to cover the document's real number. The manifest stated that there were eight adults, two children, and two infants aboard the aircraft and no baggage. This is a gross violation of aviation safety procedures that can be classified as willful misconduct if not considered as criminal act.

Since the pioneer flight operation is subsidized by the local government, there are some issues related to the funding, the operator has to compensate by selling the ticket at very low price so that common people can afford to fly. This made the passenger demand very high. However, the airline can not make the decision to add the number of flights. The local government, as the sponsor, is the one that has the authority to decide. The high demand and low supply raise the potency of bribery. Without strong supervision, the airline employee or authority may take bribe from passengers who do not want to wait in line.

The passengers reported that Captain Abdul made a deal for the sale of seats to the last two passengers for Rp 60,000 and Rp 1 million (the actual ticket price is Rp 68,000). The passengers agreed to pay the prices so that they could be included in the flight. Captain Abdul confirmed that such deals are common and that he has done this before; however, he did mention the price. Captain Abdul and his chief pilot stated that such practices are often carried out along with their colleagues to get extra money to compensate their lower salary compared to the skill and service they have to provide the company assignment.

Although Dirgantara Air Service did issue notices to all personnel and staff about the consequences of such in-disciplinary action, Dirgantara Air Service never implemented such control. This lack of control suggested that the personnel who are involved in such practices have built a belief that this unauthorized practice was actually rewarding and at any opportunity would repeat.

The practice mentioned above become a safety hazard when the crews, lured by the amount of money they will get, and knowing that there will be no adverse consequences on them, started to neglect the operating limits of the aircraft. All of these can be classified as criminal acts, and a disregard of safety.

=== Conclusion ===
The NTSC concluded the final report and the cause of the crash. The crash was caused by Captain Abdul's wrong perception while taking off. He thought that with a higher velocity, he would achieve the optimum takeoff performance, while doing so would only get the aircraft nearer to the obstacle. This forced the aircraft to climb and pitched higher, while the plane was overloaded due to Captain Abdul and the ground crews that let more passengers loaded into the aircraft than the number of seats available. This overloading was caused due to miscalculation of the overall weight, accepting passengers' bribe, and the absence of supervision system that would prevent such practice. As the aircraft climbed with a higher climb rate, the speed of the aircraft began to drop. By the time Flight 3130 had cleared from its obstacle, it had lost too much speed. The aircraft lost its altitude and crashed onto the forest.

== See also ==
- Air Midwest Flight 5481
- UTA Flight 141, deadliest crash in Benin's history that was caused by overloading
