= Long Apung Airport =

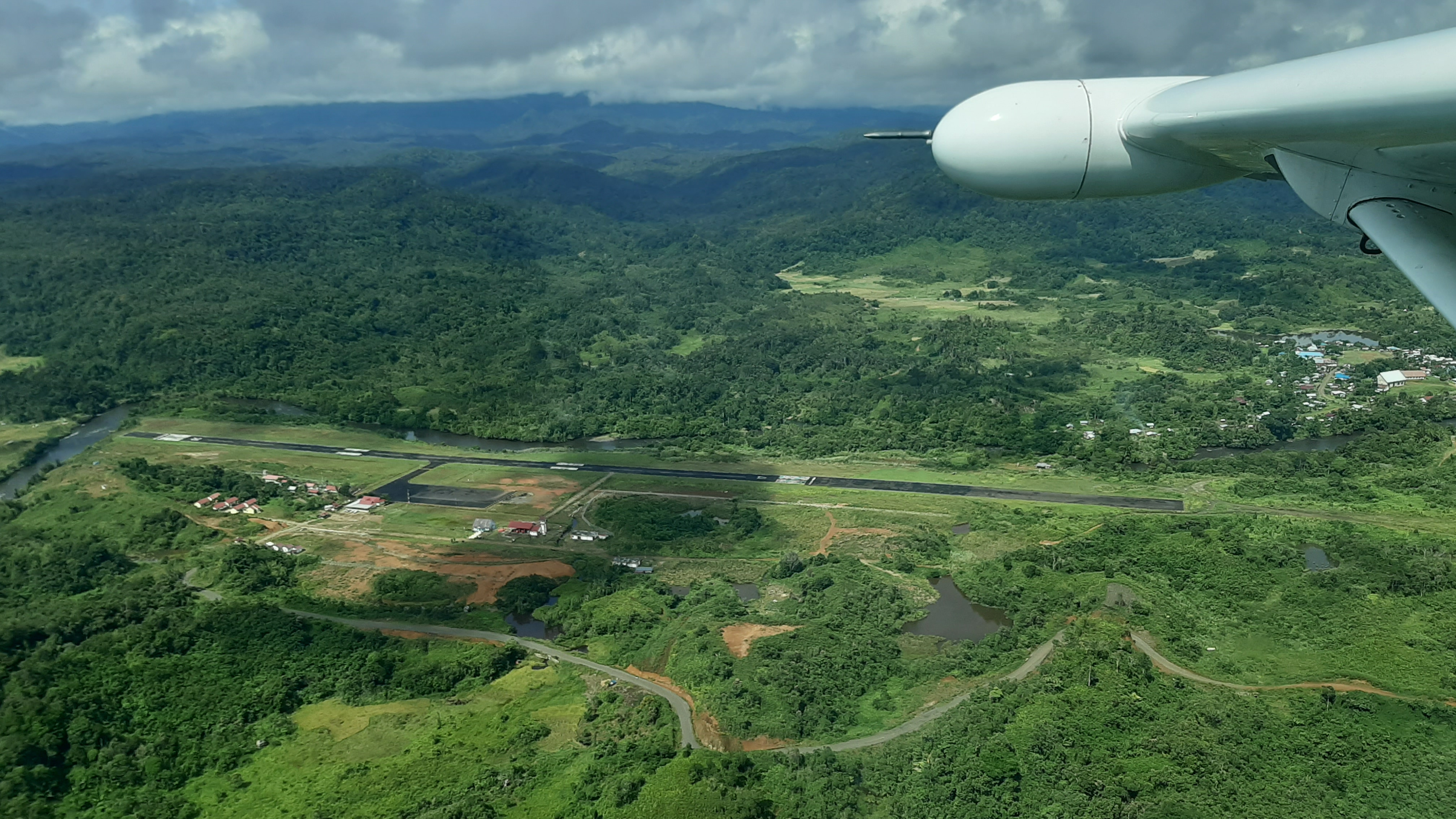
- IATA: LPU; ICAO: WAQL

Summary
- Airport type: Public
- Owner: Private
- Operator: Private
- Serves: Long Apung, Malinau Regency, North Kalimantan, Indonesia
- Location: Southern Kayan
- Time zone: WITA (UTC+08:00)
- Elevation AMSL: 640 m (2,100 ft)
- Coordinates: 01°42′13″N 114°58′13″E

Maps
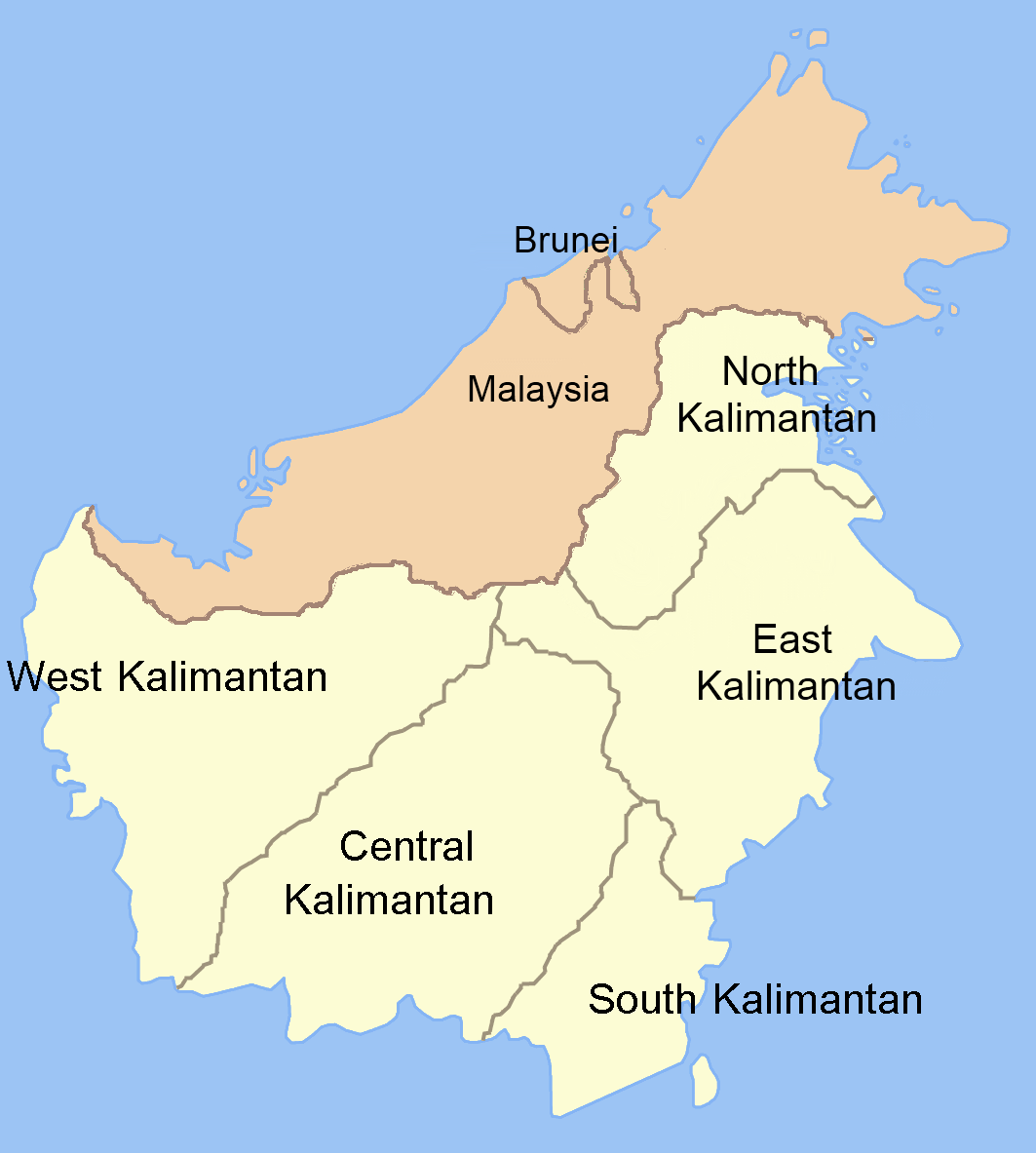
- Kalimantan provinces in Indonesia

- Location of the airport in Indonesia Borneo

Runways
Direction	Length		Surface
Direction	m	ft	Surface
17/35 2% downslope on runway 17	1,140	3,740	Pavement
- Sources: DGCA, ASN, GCM

Long Apung Airport (IATA: LPU, ICAO: WAQL formerly WRLP) is a privately owned airport serving the city of Long Apung, located in the Malinau Regency, North Kalimantan, Indonesia.

== Airlines and destinations ==
Airlines	Destinations
Susi Air	Samarinda, Tanjung Selor, Tarakan
