= Datah Dawai Airport =

Datah Dawai Airport Bandar Udara Datah Dawai
- IATA: DTD; ICAO: WALJ

Summary
- Airport type: Public
- Operator: Government
- Location: Long Pahangai, Mahakam Ulu Regency, East Kalimantan, Indonesia
- Time zone: WITA (UTC+08:00)
- Coordinates: 00°48′37″N 114°31′49″E

Map
- Location of the airport in Indonesia Borneo

Runways
| Direction | Length | | Surface |
| Direction | m | ft | Surface |
|---|---|---|---|
| 02/20 | 750 | 2,461 | Paved |
- Source: Direktorat Jenderal Perhubungan Udara

Datah Dawai Airport (IATA: DTD, ICAO: WALJ) is an airport in Long Lunuk, Long Pahangai, Mahakam Ulu Regency, East Kalimantan, Indonesia. It is the only airport in Mahakam Ulu, providing the only air service in the area. Susi Air has one daily flight from Datah Dawai to Samarinda, for a total of 12 seats daily. The airport was located near Kapuas River, the longest river in Borneo and the longest river in Indonesia. It was surrounded by high trees and green forest.

== Airport ==
The airport does not have a radio control tower, and only handles pioneer flights. It is controlled by the local government of Mahakam Ulu Regency, particularly by the Local People's Representative.

In 2013, an upgrade was planned for the airport. In 2015, the runway of the airport was lengthened and upgraded by the Indonesian government. Located near the border of Indonesia and Malaysia, the airport needs serious attention from the local government. The runway of the airport was upgraded from 850 x 23 to 1.600 x 30. Infrastructures near the airport were also upgraded by the local government. The process was done by the help of the Indonesian National Army, through Operation Bhakti Kartika Jaya. A road connecting from Long Bagun, the capital of Mahakam Ulu regency, to the airport, was also built by the Army. At the end of 2015, the upgradation had finished, with aircraft as large as a Lockheed Hercules C-130 and ATR-72 could land at the airport. This would boost the economy of Mahakam Ulu regency. The funding of the sustainability of the airport had been assessed by the local government. They planned to have a land clearing at the airport.

== Airlines and destinations ==
| Airlines | Destinations |
|---|---|
| Susi Air | Melak |

== Accidents and incidents ==
On 18 November 2000, Dirgantara Air Service Flight 3130 crashed shortly after taking off from Datah Dawai Airport. No one was killed in the crash, but all 18 people on board were injured, 11 seriously. The aircraft was a total loss, with the front section suffered the biggest impact forces. Investigation determined that the plane was overloaded, and the lack of security in Datah Dawai causes a high chances of bribery.
