= List of universities in Yogyakarta =

In the Yogyakarta Special Region, Indonesia there are four State universities, about 16 private universities, and many institutes and academies specialising in subjects such as art, science, technology, education, agriculture, and business management.

== State universities ==
- Gadjah Mada University (UGM)
- Sunan Kalijaga State Islamic University (UIN)
- Yogyakarta State University (UNY)
- National Development University "Veteran" of Yogyakarta (UPNVY)

== Private universities ==
- Universitas Ahmad Dahlan (UAD) (Ahmad Dahlan University)
- Universitas Atma Jaya Yogyakarta (Atma Jaya University, Yogyakarta)
- Universitas Cokroaminoto (UNCOK) (Cokroaminoto University)
- Universitas Dirgantara Indonesia (Dirgantara Indonesia University)
- Universitas AMIKOM Yogyakarta (University of AMIKOM Yogyakarta)
- Universitas Gunung Kidul (Gunung Kidul University)
- Universitas Islam Indonesia (Islamic University of Indonesia)
- Universitas Kristen Duta Wacana (Duta Wacana Christian University)
- Universitas Kristen Immanuel (Immanuel Christian University)
- Universitas Mercubuana (Mercu Buana University)
- Universitas Muhammadiyah Jogjakarta (UMY) (Muhammadiyah University of Yogyakarta)
- Universitas PGRI Yogyakarta
- Universitas Proklamasi 45 (UP45) (Proklamasi 45 University)
- Universitas Sanata Dharma (USD) (Sanata Dharma University)
- Universitas Sarjanawiyata Tamansiswa (UST)
- Universitas Teknologi Digital Indonesia
- Universitas Teknologi Yogyakarta (UTY) (University of Technology Yogyakarta)
- Universitas Widya Mataram

== Institutes ==
- Indonesia Institute of Arts, Yogyakarta
- Institut Keguruan dan Ilmu Pendidikan (IKIP) PGRI - Wates (Wates Institute of Education Science)
- Institut Pertanian (INSTIPER) (Institute for Plantation Agriculture)
- Institut Pertanian (INTAN) Yogyakarta (Yogyakarta Institute of Agriculture)
- Institut Sains dan Teknologi "AKPRIND" (IST Akprind) (AKPRIND Institute of Science and Technology)

=== Business administration ===
Note: S.T.I.E. – Sekolah Tinggi Ilmu Ekonomi (College of Business Administration)

- S.T.I.E. Bank
- S.T.I.E. Kerjasama (STIKER) -
- S.T.I.E. Mitra Indonesia
- S.T.I.E. Nusa Megar Kencana
- S.T.I.E. Pariwisata API
- S.T.I.E. Solusi Bisnis Indonesia (SBI)
- S.T.I.E. Widya Wiwaha (WW)
- S.T.I.E. YKPN (STIE YKPN)

=== Health sciences ===
Note: S.T.I.Kes. – Sekolah Tinggi Ilmu Kesehtan (College of Health Sciences)

- S.T.I.Kes. Achmad Yani
- S.T.I.Kes. Aisyiah
- S.T.I.Kes. Alma Ata
- S.T.I.Kes. Respati
- S.T.I.Kes. Surya Global
- S.T.I.Kes. Wira Husada

=== Information technology ===
Note: S.T.M.I.K. – Sekolah Tinggi Manajemen Informatika dan Komputer (College of Information Technology and Computer Management)

- S.T.M.I.K. El Rahma Yogyakarta
- S.T.M.I.K. Jendral Ahmad Yani
- S.T.M.I.K. Pelita Nusantara Yogyakarta

=== Technology ===
Note: S.T.I. – Sekolah Tinggi Teknologi (College of Technology)

- S.T.T. Adisutjipto
- S.T.T. Kedirgantaraan (Sekolah Tinggi Teknologi Kedirgantaraan)
- S.T.T. Nasional
- S.T.T. Nuklir - BATAN
- S.T.T. Yogyakarta

=== Tourism ===
- Sekolah Tinggi Pariwisata "AMPTA" ("AMPTA" College of Tourism)

=== Village community development ===
- Sekolah Tinggi Pembangunan Masyarakat Desa "A.P.M.D." ("A.P.M.D" College of Village Community Development")

== Academies ==
- Akademi Akuntansi Sapta Widya Utama (Sapta Widya Utama Academy of Accounting)
- Akademi Manajemen Putra Jaya (Putra Jaya Academy of Management)
- Akademi Maritim Yogyakarta (A.M.Y.) (Yogyakarta Maritime Academy)
- Akademi Seni Rupa dan Desain "ADVY" (ADVY Academy of Visual Art and Design)
- Akademi Seni Rupa dan Desain "AKSERI" (AKSERI Academy of Visual Art and Design)
- Akademi Seni Rupa dan Desain "M.S.D." (MSD Academy of Visual Art and Design)
- Akademi Seni Rupa dan Desain ADA Yogyakarta (ADA Academy of Visual Art and Design)
- Akademi Tehnik Arsitektur "YKPN"
- Akademi Tentara Nasional Indonesia - Angkatan Udara (A.A.U.) (Indonesian Air Force Academy - Adisucipto Air Base)
- Akedemi Akuntansi "YKPN" ("Y.K.P.N." Academy of Accounting)

== See also ==
- List of Indonesian agricultural universities and colleges
- List of universities in Indonesia
