= Aji Pangeran Tumenggung Pranoto International Airport =

Main airport in Samarinda

Aji Pangeran Tumenggung Pranoto Airport Bandar Udara Aji Pangeran Tumenggung Pranoto

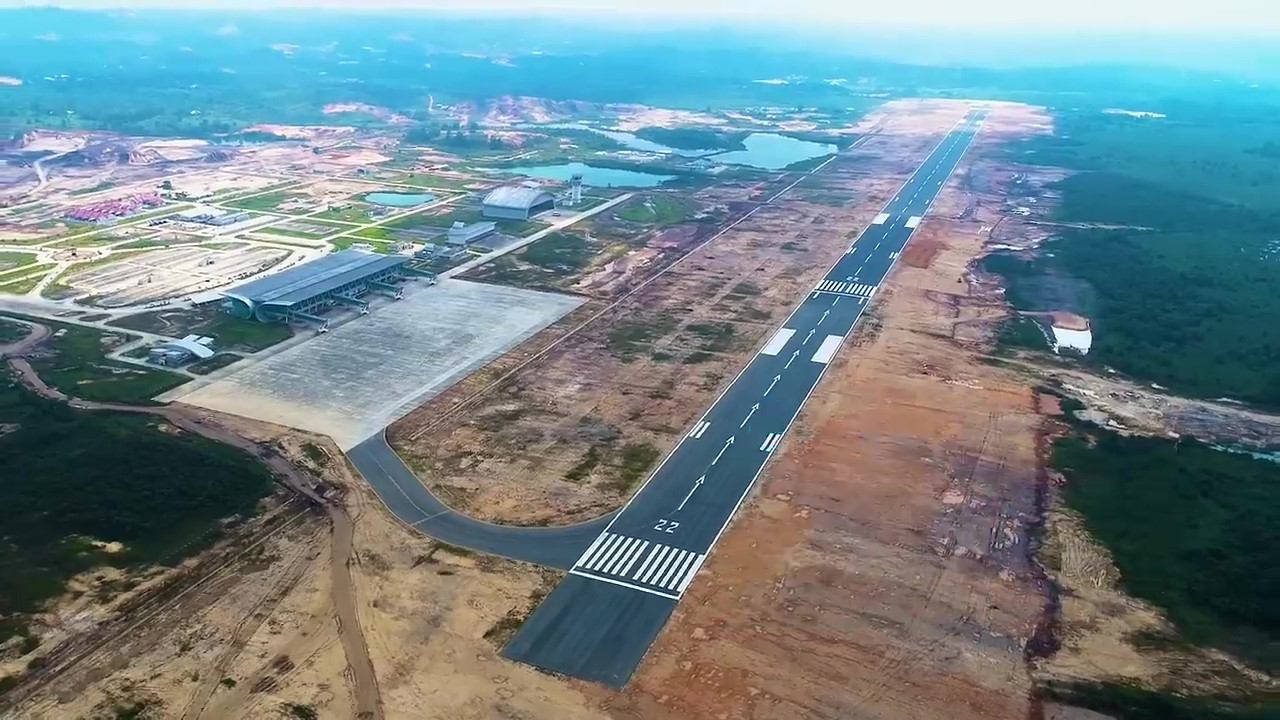
- IATA: AAP; ICAO: WALS; WMO: 96607

Summary
- Airport type: Public
- Owner: Government of Indonesia
- Operator: Directorate General of Civil Aviation
- Serves: Samarinda, East Kalimantan
- Location: Sungai Siring, North Samarinda, Samarinda
- Opened: 24 May 2018; 8 years ago
- Hub for: Smart Aviation
- Time zone: WITA (UTC+08:00)
- Elevation AMSL: 25 m (82 ft)
- Coordinates: 0°22′25″S 117°15′20″E
- Website: www.aptpairport.id

Map
- Location in Samarinda

Runways
Direction	Length		Surface
Direction	m	ft	Surface
04/22	2,250	7,382	Asphalt

Statistics (2024)
- Passengers: 846,252 (▲12.4%)
- Aircraft movements: 8,828 (▲24.5%)
- Cargo (metric tonnes): 4,184 (▲17.6%)
- Source: Samarinda International Airport

Aji Pangeran Tumenggung Pranoto Airport (IATA: AAP, ICAO: WALS), also known as APT Pranoto Airport or Samarinda Airport, is an international airport in the subdistrict of Sungai Siring in northern Samarinda. The airport is also colloquially known as Sungai Siring Airport, to distinguish it from its predecessor, the now-closed Temindung Airport. The airport is named after Aji Pangeran Tumenggung Pranoto (1906–1976), the first governor of East Kalimantan who was in office from 1957 to 1961.

The airport is operated by Directorate General of Civil Aviation (DGCA), under the Ministry of Transportation. In 2022, the Indonesian Ministry of Transportation planned to partially sell the airport stake to foreign corporation and Astra Infra.

In 2019, Samarinda Airport handled 1.1 million passengers and according to Indonesian government, the airport will reach its maximum terminal capacity (1.5 million passengers) if no extra terminal is added. About 68 percent of its flights are operated with narrow-body jets.

In the first half of 2021, the airport achieved the third fastest passenger rebound in East Borneo, recording a 1.22% increase year-on-year, ahead of Sultan Aji Muhammad Sulaiman Sepinggan Airport (fourth place). The figure still remains below the pre-pandemic (2019) levels. However the airport passenger market share actually increased by over 2% (23%) during the first half of 2021, compared to 2020 levels (East Kalimantan). The airport was chosen as one of the Top 11 Remarkable International-Class Airports in Indonesia by Wonderful Indonesia in 2020.

== History ==
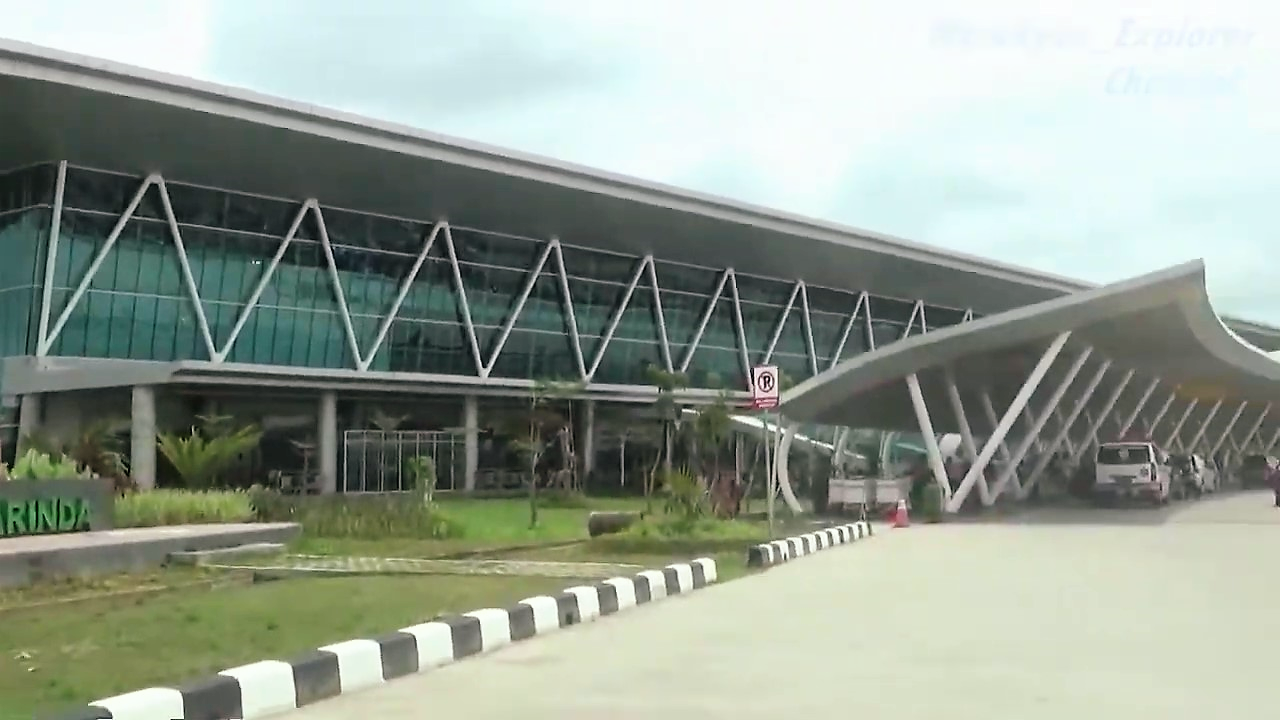
Facade of the passenger terminal

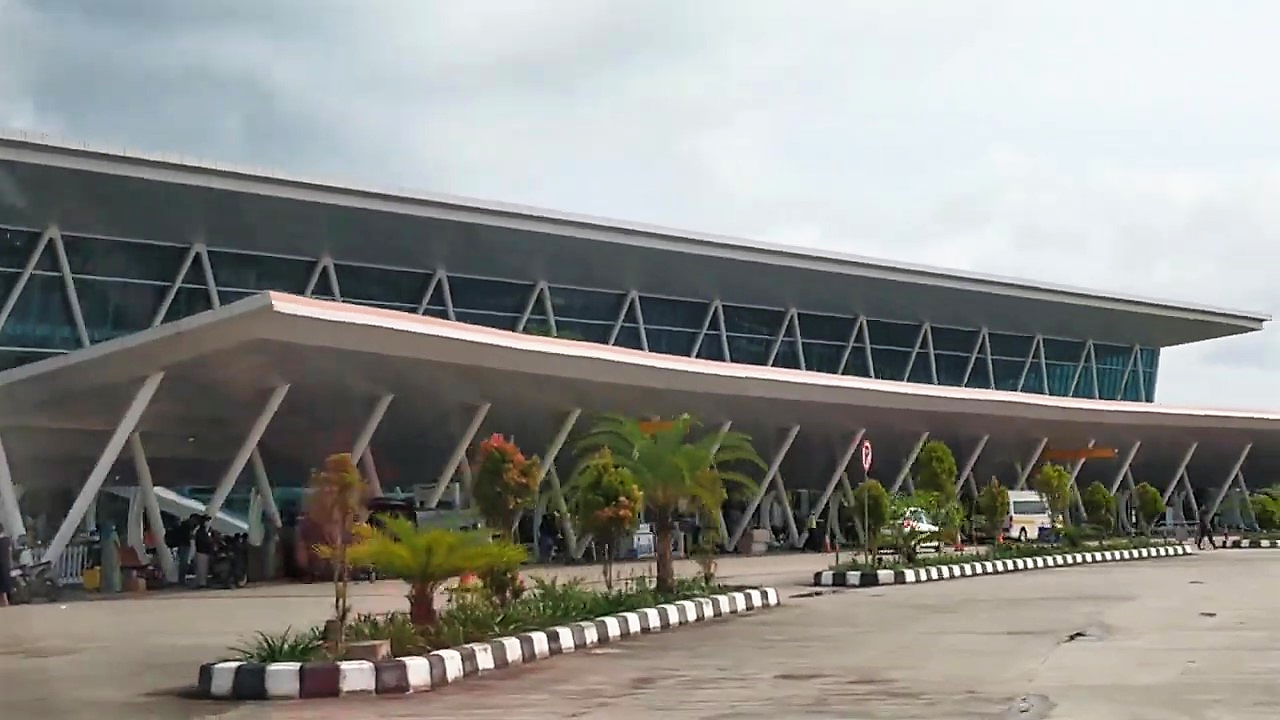
Exterior of the terminal

Sungai Siring Airport was designed as a replacement for the former Samarinda Airport (commonly known as Temindung Airport) originally built in 1973. Located in the densely built-up Sungai Pinang District with a single runway extending into settlements, Temindung had only limited room for expansion to cope with steadily increasing air traffic. By the 2000s, Temindung had become one of East Kalimantan's busiest airports – it far exceeded its annual passenger and cargo design capacities. One out of every 25 flights experienced delays, largely due to lack of space for aircraft, gates, and runway.

A 1992 planning study by Civil Aviation and Public Works departments identified the district of Sungai Siring, as a possible airport replacement site. Away from the congested city centre, flight paths would be routed over North Samarinda rather than populous urban areas, enabling efficient round-the-clock operation of multiple runways. The Sungai Siring (SGS) airport master plan was completed in 1995. In 1998, however, the government shelved the project for financial and economic reasons. The Airport Location Study was undertaken by Indonesian consultants. This study came up with four recommended locations for overall strategic development in Samarinda. One of the four assumed a new airport at Makroman; a second assumed a new airport at Palaran; the third assumed a new airport at Sungai Siring; and the fourth assumed a new airport at Bayur. In November 2003 the Governor of East Borneo announced that a decision had been made on the Airport Location Study. The strategy was a replacement airport at Sungai Siring, levelled to a height of 25 metres.

The consultants advised that the earliest the airport could be opened was June 2009. However, in reaching the government's decision, this date was modified to December 2007. Construction of the new airport began in 2005.

The construction period was very slow; specialists considered only 2–3-year period was sufficient for this aviation project. There was uncertain future of the airport construction after Panitia Pengadaan BSB manipulated the nomination of PT NCR as the contractor. It was originally believed that BPKP preferred to keep everything investigated and minimise financial commitments for the project temporarily, therefore stopping all construction. In practice, the airport did not finish in time for the investigation. However, the government of East Borneo gave an additional year's deadline.

Construction of the new airport was only part of the MP3EI Master Plan, which also involved construction of new road and rail links to the airport. The detailed design for the airport terminal was awarded to Arkonin, with Airmas Asri as specialist designers for airport related aspects. The terminal characterised by wingspanned curve roof and solar-powered rooftops. Project architects were PT Waskita Karya. The airport was Indonesia's second-best airport construction project, according to Indonesia.go.id.

The airport was officially opened in an opening ceremony by President of Indonesia Joko Widodo and Governor Awang Faroek on 24 May 2018, concluding the twelve-year construction that cost US$0.4 billion.

On 30 April 2019 at 10:35, Vatican ambassador Piero Pioppo, landed at the new airport and became the first ambassador to arrive at the new airport. On 18 November 2019, Malaysian ambassador Zainal Abidin Bakar, landed at the new airport and became the second ambassador to arrive at the new airport. On 17 December 2020 at 10:21 Samarinda Time, AirAsia flight QZ 981, carrying its Head of Government Relations, Eddy Krismeidi, landed at the new airport and became the first Malaysian airline to arrive at the new airport.

The airport became international in August 2025, and it will planning to open scheduled international flights to Singapore and Kuala Lumpur, Malaysia

== Facilities and development ==
=== Facilities ===
The airport covers an area of 470 hectares (1.8 sq mi). The airport has four boarding gates, with four jet bridge gates. All jet bridges are capable of handling the Airbus A320.

The airport has one runway, which is 2,250 metres (7,380 ft) in length and 45 metres (148 ft) wide. The runway can accommodate 27 aircraft movements an hour.

The runway is planned to be lengthened to 3,000 m in the future to accommodate wide-body aircraft such as the Airbus A330, Boeing 747, Boeing 767, and Boeing 777. To create better aviation services, civil engineering students of Mulawarman University suggested the government to upgrade the runway so that it is 3,405 metres (11,171 ft) in length and 58 metres (190 ft) wide. The airport has a total capacity of 1.5 million passengers annually and terminal has an area of 16,468 m^{2} (177,260 sq ft).

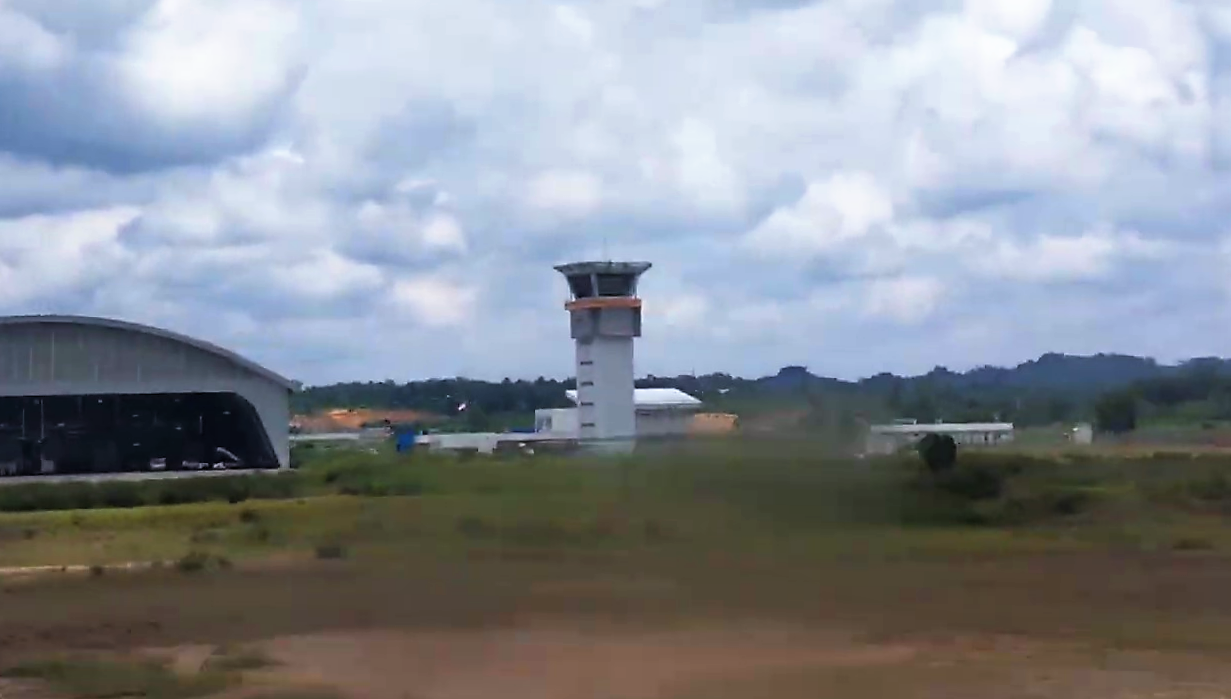
Control tower

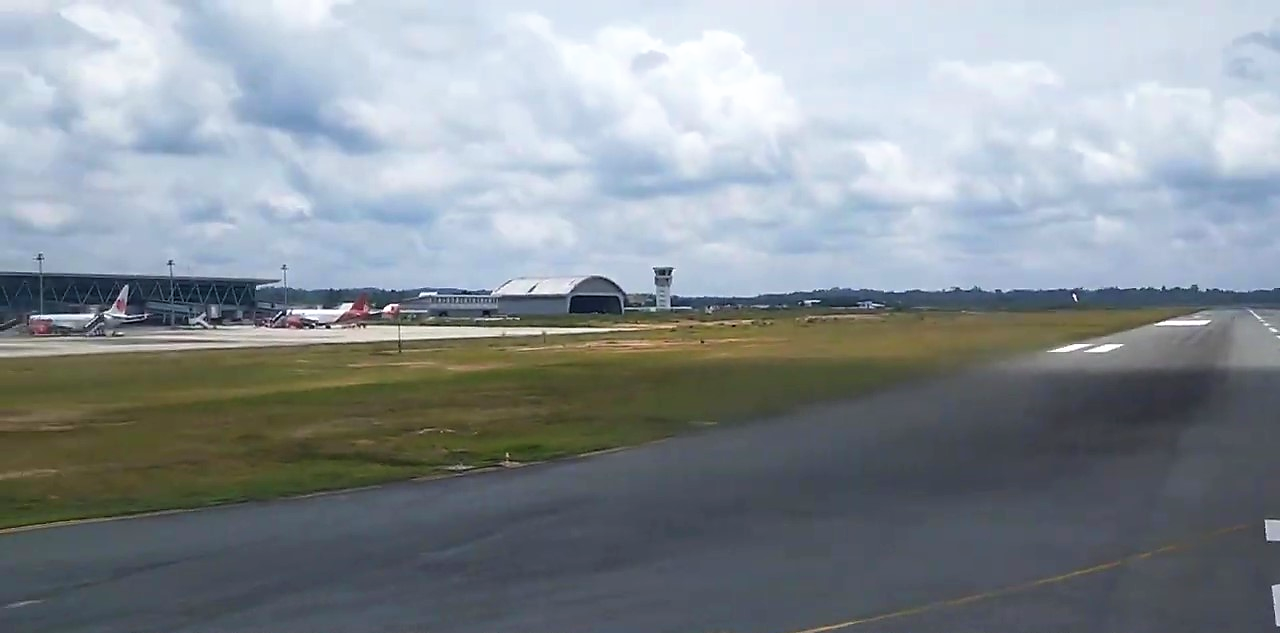
Lion Air, Batik Air and control tower

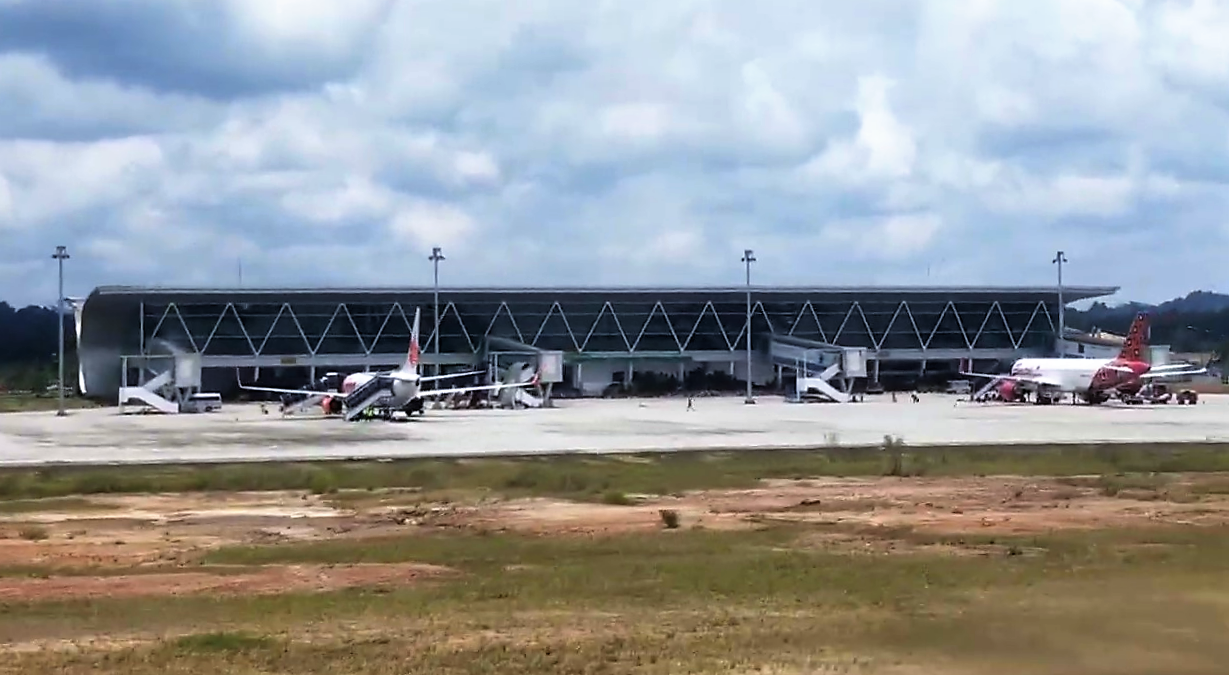
View of the terminal, captured from Batik Air Airbus A320

==== Passenger facilities ====
The VVIP building is located within the airport and has its own terminal and facilities separate from the public terminal. It provides services for executive aircraft and passengers, including a passenger lounge.

==== Cargo facilities ====
In 2024, Samarinda Airport handles 4,184 tonnes of cargo. UK air cargo company, Menzies Aviation operates one air cargo terminal at the airport. The 1,148-square-metre (12,360 sq ft) cargo terminal has a capacity of 16 thousand tonnes a year.

==== Airport based ground services ====
The air traffic control (ATC) building, located at the centre of the airfield, is the nerve centre of the entire air traffic control system. 16 air traffic controllers and supporting staff work to provide air traffic control services.

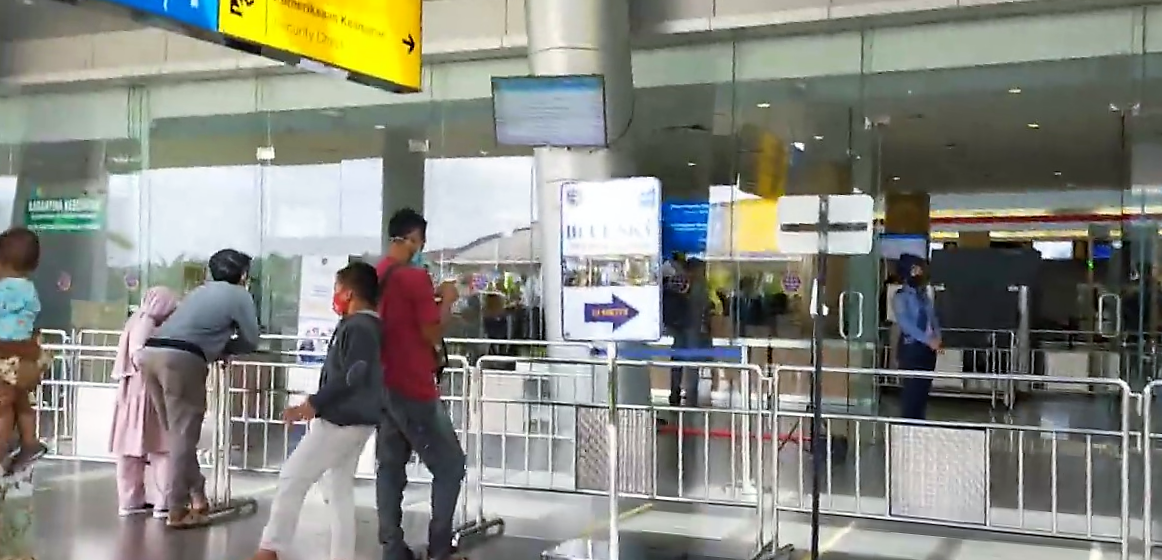
Departures hall entrance

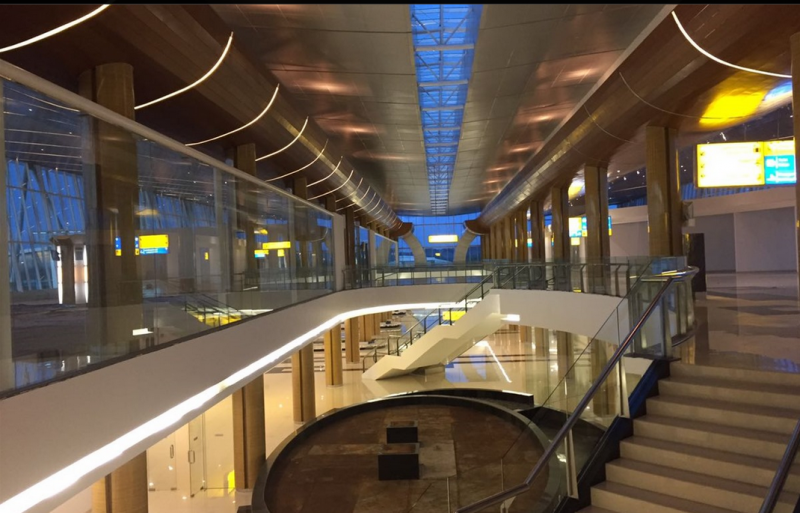
The interior of terminal at night

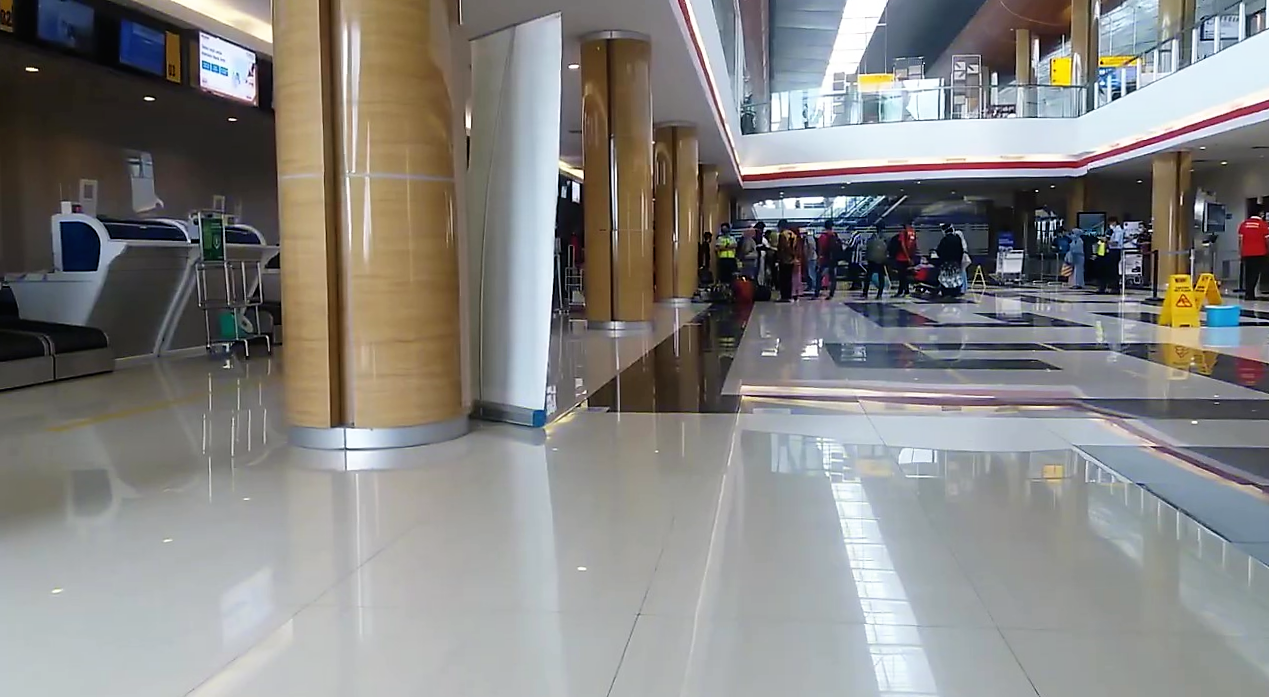
Check-in counters

=== Future development ===
Airport layout after expansion

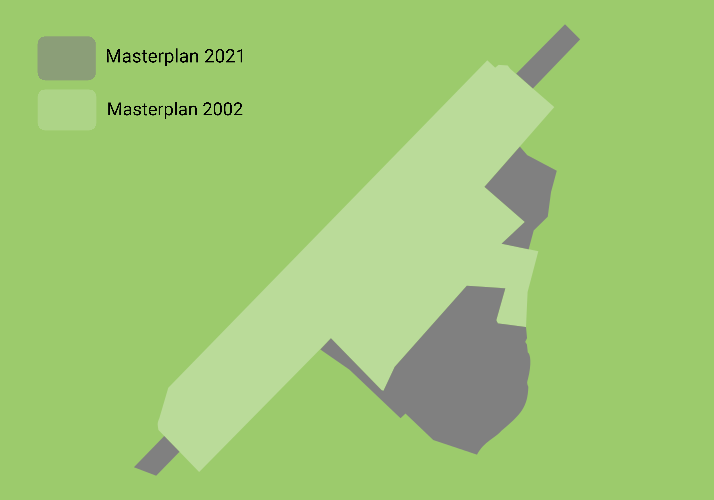
Map showing the development land of Samarinda International Airport

In 2018, Ahmad Wicaksono (University of Tokyo), Aviantara Wahyu Nugraha (University of Brawijaya) et al., expected significant passenger growth in Samarinda International Airport, it will serve over nine million passengers in 2023 - six times the airport's capacity in 2018, suggested the government to upgrade North Samarinda Road (Jalan Poros) to make sure people can get to the airport easily and quickly. According to Muhammadiyah University West Sumatra journal, the government should develop full-fledged passenger services and an extensive retail and dining offerings in SRIA to fully meet passenger demand.

In June 2019, the airport authority unveiled plans to develop the airport. The main focus is to improve the overall capacity and aircraft handling ability of the airport.

Apron facilities will be upgraded, so they can handle 22 Boeing aircraft. According to Gajah Mada University research, the upgrade was simply a must as the current apron will operate beyond its capacity in 2025.

The airport authority also plans to build a new passenger terminal (completion 2023), with an area measuring 120,000 square metres (1,300,000 sq ft). Additional cargo terminal, 133,895-square-metre (1,441,230 sq ft) cargo facilities and 68,000-square-metre (730,000 sq ft) aircraft maintenance facilities will be built as well. The project began in 2020, cost US$22.7 million and was expected to be completed in 2023.

It will enable the airport to cater for Samarinda and new Indonesian capital's air traffic demand, also to serve passengers from North Balikpapan to Bontang in 2045. Combined with the new apron facilities, it is estimated that the airport would be able to meet forecast annual passenger throughput of about 20 million.

In 2020, two architectural students released their design for the airport's new terminal, Fitria Wulan Sari, et al. (Yogyakarta University of Technology) and Prita Eriani Putri et al. (Diponegoro University). The new passenger terminal project is one of Indonesia core projects in 2022 (Prioritas RKP 2022).

In July 2021, Samarinda Government announced their ground transport plan, there will be an enhancements to road networks to connect services between Samarinda/East Kalimantan (Balikpapan, Bontang) and Samarinda International Airport.

==== Master plan 2036 ====
Samarinda International Airport is nearly reaching its operational capacity, as Samarinda economy booms. Multi Konsulindo served as the consultant for Samarinda Airport (APT Pranoto) Master Plan 2036, a blueprint that will ensure SRIA can meet the growing demand for aviation services. The new detailed design of Samarinda International Airport will be completed in 2024. The airport will undergo major expansion plans north of the airport.

As part of Samarinda Rail network, a dedicated rail link from the urban area to the airport will be built. It will run from Samarinda Station (Air Putih) along North Sempaja and terminate at the airport.

==== Samarinda Project 2026 (RPJMD 2026) ====
On 19 July 2021, Samarinda Government announced their latest version of the rail network plan. The plan will focus on building fastest transport service from the city to the airport. Samarinda SkyTrain, a dedicated high-speed rail link as part of Samarinda MRT (rapid transit) network, will be built. The line will make intermediate stops at South Sempaja.

Airport Line (SkyTrain) according to Samarinda Master Plan 2042

On 12 August 2021, the government published Samarinda Project 2026 (RPJMD 2026), a series of Samarinda infrastructure projects during the early 2020s. One of the ten core projects is construction of new high-speed rail link to the airport.

Chief Secretary of Samarinda, Sugeng Chairuddin recommended to extend the airport line south to include Samarinda Station in Sungai Kunjang (Big Mall). It will take approximately 12 minutes to reach the airport from South Sempaja station.

== Airlines and destinations ==
=== Passenger ===
Airlines	Destinations
Batik Air	Jakarta–Soekarno-Hatta
Citilink	Jakarta–Soekarno-Hatta, Surabaya
Garuda Indonesia	Jakarta–Soekarno-Hatta
Smart Aviation	Long Apung, Long Pahangai, Maratua
Super Air Jet	Surabaya, Yogyakarta–International
Wings Air	Banjarmasin, Melak, Tanjung Redeb

== Statistics ==
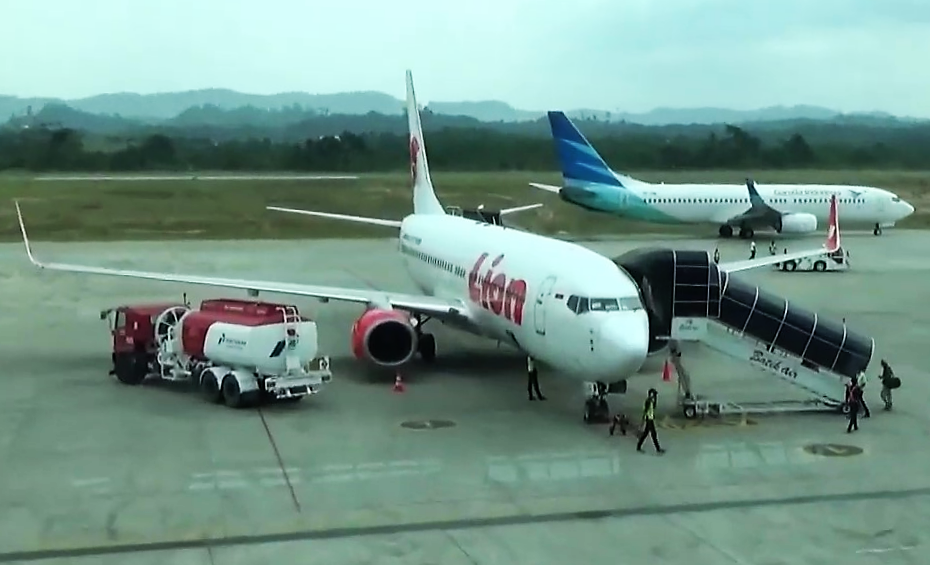
A Lion Air Boeing 737-800 at gate and a taxiing Garuda Indonesia Boeing 737-800

Operations and statistics
Year	Passengers handled	Passenger % change	Cargo (tonnes)	Cargo % change	Aircraft movements	Aircraft % change
2018	100,900	Steady	63	Steady	3,170	Steady
2019	1,112,700	▲1002.8	206	▲227.0	11,020	▲247.6
2020	572,918	▼48.5	678	▲229.1	6,647	▼39.7
2021	490,737	▼14.3	3,242	▲378.2	5,445	▼18.1
2022	662,454	▲35.0	3,060	▼5.6	6,236	▲14.5
2023	752,913	▲13.7	3,576	▲16.9	7,092	▲13.7
2024	846,252	▲12.4	4,184	▲17.0	8,828	▲24.5
Capacity
Passenger (current)						1,112,700
Passenger (ultimate)						1,500,000
Number of destinations
Indonesia						9

== Ground transport ==
The airport is connected to inner Samarinda by the North Samarinda (Poros) Road.

=== Bus ===
DAMRI operates two bus routes to the airport from various parts of Samarinda. In addition to DAMRI and local minibuses, Banyumili Travel offers scheduled shuttle services connecting the airport to key cities across East Kalimantan, including Sangatta, Bontang, and Balikpapan. These services operate with full-AC Toyota HiAce Premio vans and provide door-to-door transport tailored for passengers traveling to industrial hubs and urban centers. Booking is available online through trusted platforms and Banyumili's official website.

=== Taxi ===
The airport is served by six different types of taxi, distinguished by their colour:

- GrabAirport
- Aerocab
- Angkasa
- Kilat
- Sentra
- Primkopau

== Accolades ==
- Bandara Awards 3rd Best Airport in Indonesia - UPBU (2019)

== See also ==
- Temindung Airport
