= Long Apung =

Long Apung (Kota Long Ampung)
- City
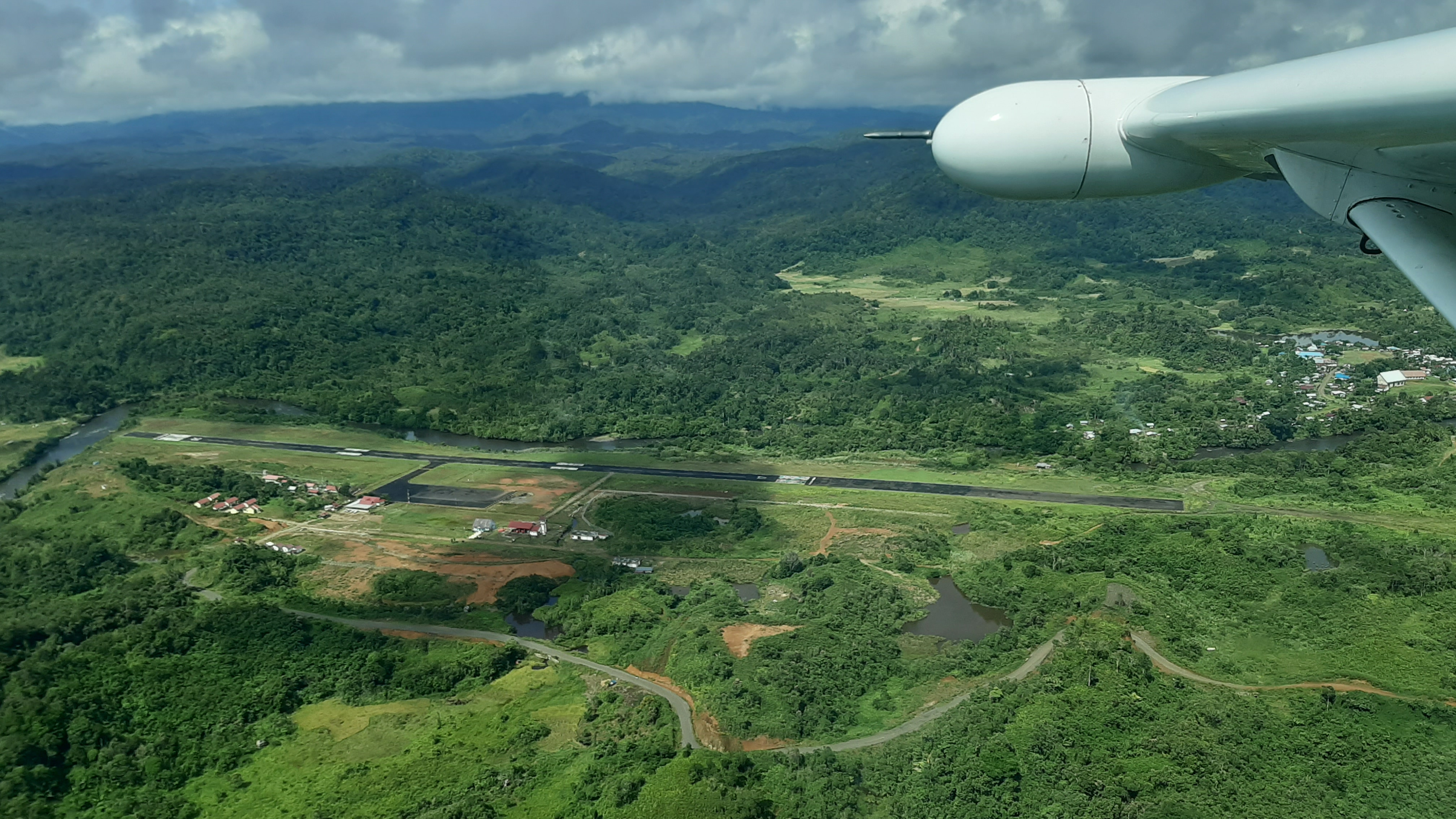
- Long Apung Airfield

- Location within Kalimantan Location within Indonesia
- Coordinates: 01°41′39″N 114°58′13″E
- Country: Indonesia
- Subdivision: North Borneo
- Time zone: UTC+8 (WITA)
- Area code: (+62)

Long Apung is one of the villages in the Malinau Regency, in the North Kalimantan province of Indonesia. It is served by Long Apung Airport.
