= Temindung Airport =

Former airport that served Samarinda, East Kalimantan, Indonesia (1974–2018)

Temindung Airport Bandara Temindung
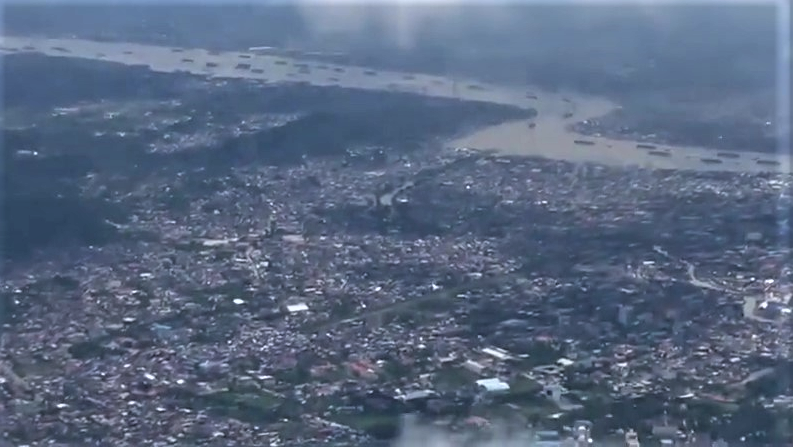
- Temindung Airport in 2021, 3 years after its closure
- IATA: ~~SRI~~; ICAO: ~~WALS~~

Summary
- Airport type: Defunct
- Operator: Civil Aviation Department
- Serves: Samarinda
- Location: Sungai Pinang, Samarinda
- Opened: 1974
- Closed: 24 May 2018
- Elevation AMSL: 10 m (33 ft)
- Coordinates: 0°28′53″S 117°9′21″E

Map
- Location in Samarinda Location in Kalimantan Location in Indonesia

Runways
Direction	Length		Surface
Direction	m	ft	Surface
~~04/22~~	~~1,160~~	~~3,806~~	~~Asphalt~~ (Closed)

Temindung Airport ~~(IATA: SRI, ICAO: WALS)~~ was the airport of Samarinda, Indonesia, from 1974 until 2018. It was officially known as Samarinda Airport, it was closed and replaced by the new APT Pranoto International Airport at Sungai Siring, 30 kilometres (19 mi) to the north. It is often known as Samarinda Airport, Temindung Airport, or simply Temindung, to distinguish it from its successor which is often referred to as Sungai Siring Airport.

The airport was home to Samarinda's carrier Kaltim Airlines. Temindung is located on the north side of Karangmumus River in Sungai Pinang, Samarinda. There is only one runway in use, numbered 04/22 and oriented northeast–southwest (34/214 degrees true, 32/212 degrees magnetic). Near the southern end of the runway, a building rose up to nine stories.

== History ==
=== 1980s to 1990s ===
Clearance requirements for aircraft takeoffs and landings made it necessary to limit the height of buildings that could be built in Samarinda. While Temindung was initially located far away from residential areas, the expansion of residential areas resulted in Temindung being close to residential areas. This caused serious noise pollution for nearby residents. A night curfew from night to about 7:00 in the early morning also hindered operations. As a result, in the early 1990s, the Samarinda Government began searching for alternative locations for a new airport in Samarinda to replace the aging airport. After deliberating on a number of locations, including the south side of Samarinda, the government decided to build the airport on the village of Sungai Siring.

== Operations ==
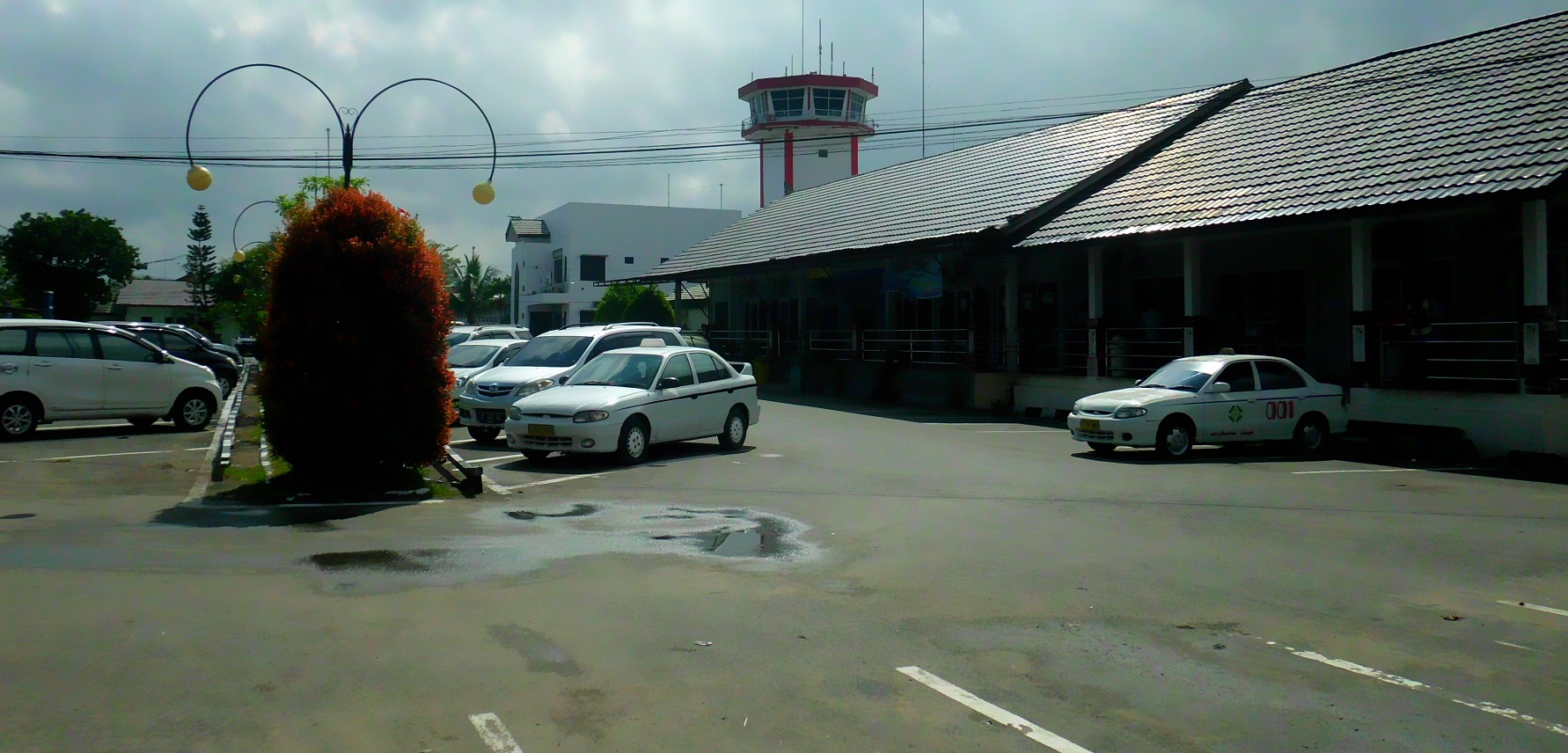
Airport forecourt

=== Terminals and facilities ===
Layout of Temindung Airport

The Temindung airport consisted of a linear passenger terminal building with a car park at the front. There is one boarding gate at the terminal building.

Due to the limited space, the fuel tank farm is located between airport authority building and maintenance facilities (hangar).

=== Airlines based at Temindung ===
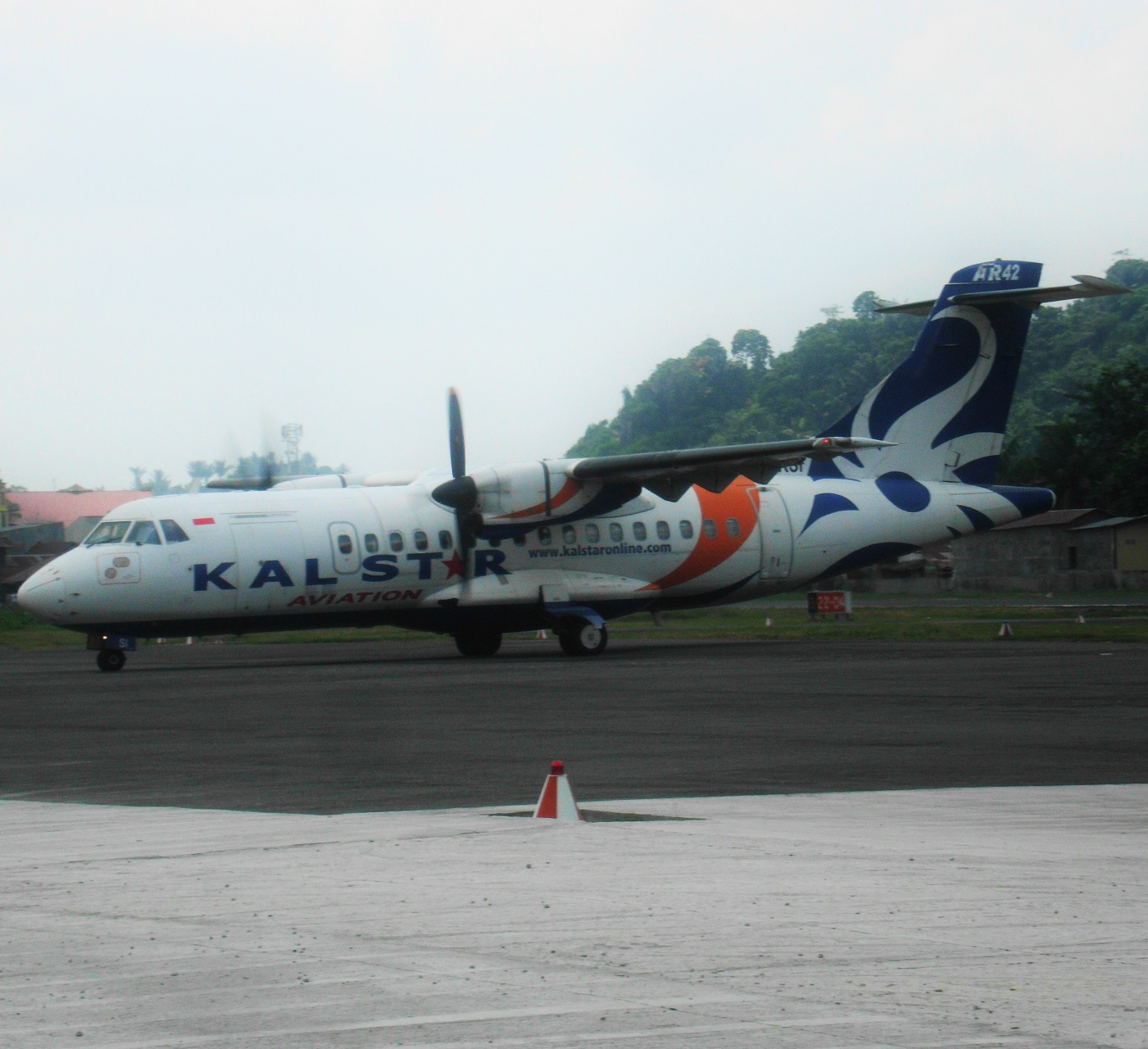
Kalstar Aviation ATR 42-300 taxiing at Temindung Airport

Several airlines were based at Temindung:

- Kaltim Airlines
- DAS
- Kurakura Aviation
- Kalstar Aviation

== Future plans for the site ==
The Government drafted a plan for Temindung Airport site to be used for commercial area, housing estate, hotels and green space. However, on late January 2024, parts of the old runway had been turned into a highway, connecting S Parman Road and KH Samanhudi Road.
