= Sampit =

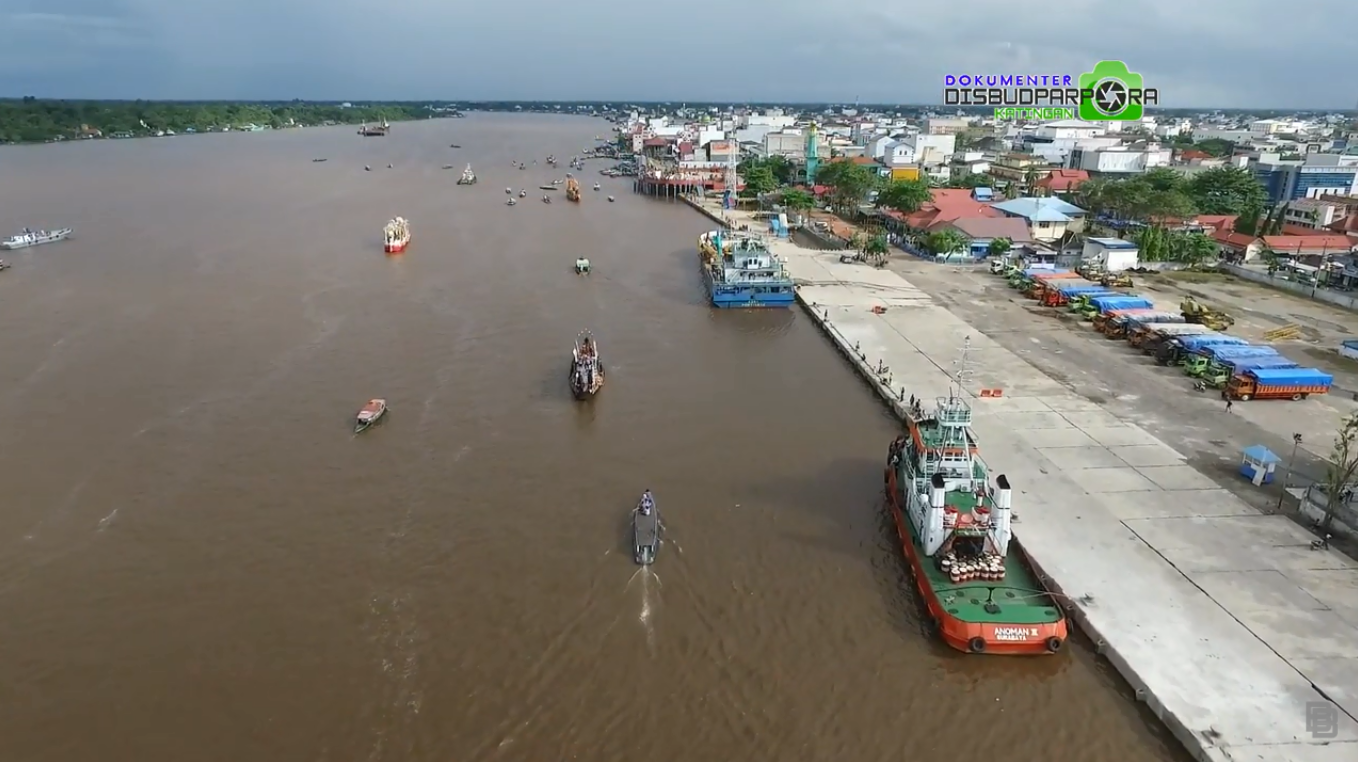
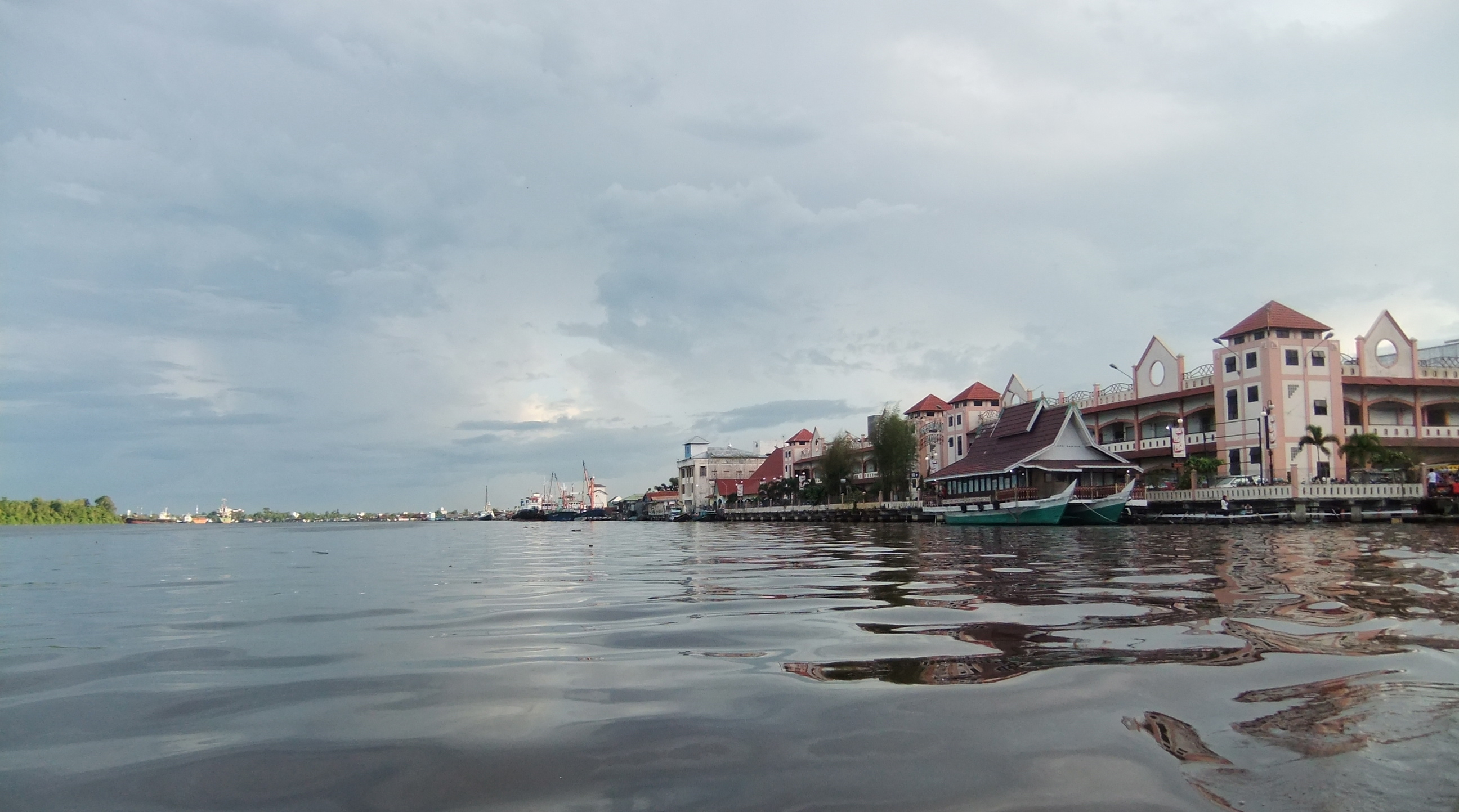
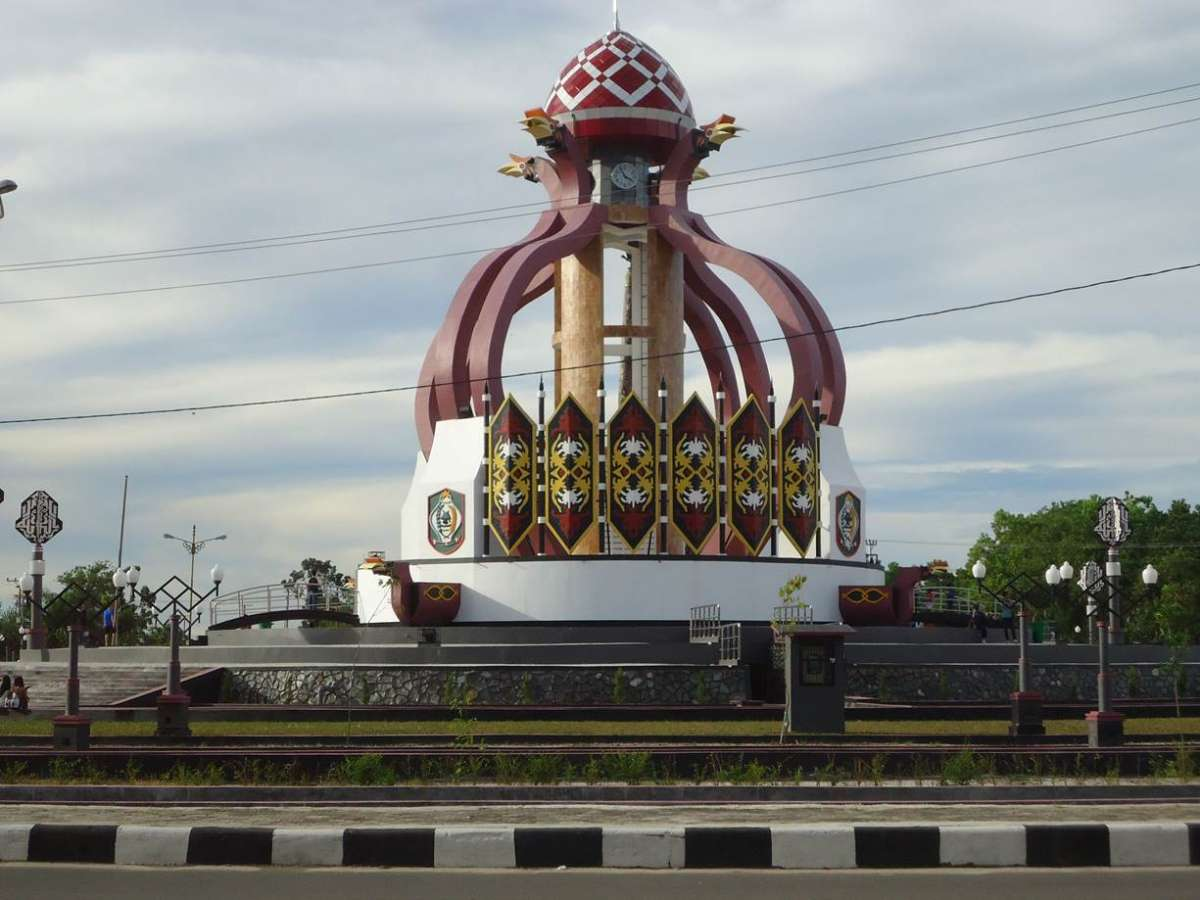
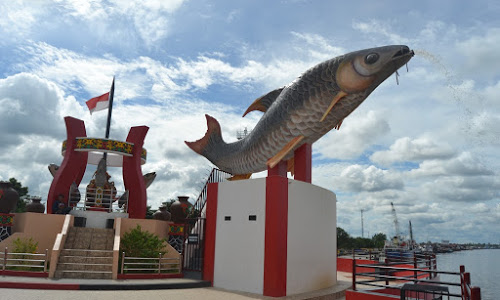
- Clockwise from top: Sampit waterfront seen from above looking towards the south, with the Sampit River to the left; the Sampit Peace Monument; the Jelawat Fish Statue; and the Mentaya Shopping Center

- Location within Kalimantan
- Coordinates: 2°32′S 112°57′E
- Country: Indonesia
- Province: Central Kalimantan
- Regency: East Kotawaringin Regency

Area
  - Total: 344.64 km^{2} (133.07 sq mi)

Population
  - Estimate (mid 2025 estimate): 169,363
  - Density: 491.42/km^{2} (1,272.8/sq mi)
- Time zone: UTC+7 (Western Indonesian Time)

Sampit is a large town located in East Kotawaringin Regency, Central Kalimantan Province of Indonesia. Previously a timber port town situated on the Sampit River, it has grown to be a medium-sized community with a population of 166,773 according to Statistics Indonesia in 2019, with the economy having since divested from timber products. However, the town is not an autonomous city and is not an administrative division in its own right, despite having a sizeable population and urban built-up.

It consists of ten urban villages (kelurahan) and one "rural" village (desa), comprising Mentawa Baru Ketapang District (all except 5 desa of Pelangsian, Eka Bahurui, Bengkuang Makmur, Bapeang and Bapanggang Raya, with a combined area of 158.32 km^{2} and a total population of 14,870 in 2025, in the south of the district), and most of Baamang District (except the desa of Tinduk, with 1,647 inhabitants, in the north of the district), as detailed below. The total area of the urban area is 344.64 square kilometres and the population was estimated at 169,363 as at mid 2025.

Kode Wilayah	Name of District (kecamatan)	Name of kelurahan or desa	Area in km^{2}	Pop'n Estimate mid 2025	Post codes
62.02.06.1003	Mentawa Baru Ketapang	Ketapang	19.52	28,813	74325
62.02.06.2010	Mentawa Baru Ketapang	Telaga Baru (desa)	11.67	5,437	74326
62.02.06.1002	Mentawa Baru Ketapang	Mentawa Baru Hilir	8.81	23,624	74323
62.02.06.1001	Mentawa Baru Ketapang	Mentawa Baru Hulu	7.46	16,306	74322
62.02.06.1007	Mentawa Baru Ketapang	Sawahan	5.51	9,592	74321
62.02.06.1009	Mentawa Baru Ketapang	Pasir Putih	138.17	9,649	74322
62.02.05.1001	Baamang	Baamang Hilir	0.81	8,504	74311
62.02.05.1002	Baamang	Baamang Tengah	5.54	31,522	74312
62.02.05.1003	Baamang	Baamang Hulu	87.85	14,099	74313
62.02.05.1007	Baamang	Tanah Mas	17.11	1,646	74312
62.02.05.1008	Baamang	Baamang Barat	42.19	20,171	74312
	Total		344.64	169,363	

In addition, the kelurahan of Mentaya Seberang (administratively part of Seranau District) is situated on the east bank of the Sampit River across from Sampit town ("semerang" in Indonesian means "across" or "on the other side of" [the river]) and covers an area of 253.33 km^{2} with 3,794 inhabitants in 2025 and a postcode of 74324.

== Etymology ==
The origin of the town's name is disputed. The name is thought to be derived from Chinese. 31 Chinese laborers worked for a plantation in the area during the colonial era, with "sam-it" roughly meaning 31. In the 18th century, sampit is the spelling used by Daniel Beekman in describing the sumpit, a type of blow weapon used by the inhabitants of the Borneo interior.

== History ==
=== Early history ===
The region was previously thought to be under a tribal kingdom founded by Ot Danum people between the 13th and 14th century although the existence of the kingdom is disputed. The region became part of the Sultanate of Banjar in the early 16th century. The region was ceded to the Dutch East Indies by Sultan Adam of Banjar on 4 May 1826.

=== Modern history ===
During World War II, Sampit came under control of the Imperial Japanese Navy together with Banjarmasin. The Proclamation of Indonesian Independence was made by Indonesian nationalist in the town through radio and a Japanese newspaper Borneo Shimbun between September and October 1945. Unlike most of cities in Kalimantan which have been liberated by Allied forces of Australia, Sampit remained under Japanese control until 1946. Conflict between Indonesian nationalist and newly arrived Dutch troops continued until 1949.

Sampit became known worldwide following inter-ethnic violent communal clashes between the Dayaks and the Madurese migrants during the Sampit conflict which broke out on 17 February 2001 and lasted for 10 days. There are a number of stories purportedly describing the incident that sparked the violence in 2001. One version claims that it was caused by an arson attack on a Dayak house. Rumours spread that the fire was caused by Madurese, and later a group of Dayaks began burning houses in a Madurese neighbourhood. Another version says that the massacre was triggered by an earlier incident in December 2000 when a Dayak man was killed by three Madurese. The clash was also thought to be triggered by perceived threat of Madurese economically dominating Dayaks, although this is not proven. The conflict has been described by Inside Indonesia as an "ethnic fascism". Central and local government did little to stop the violence and some of the army generals and politicians of Dayak descent decided to use the violence to gain power.

== Climate ==
Sampit has a tropical rainforest climate (Af) with heavy rainfall year-round.

Climate data for Sampit
Month	Jan	Feb	Mar	Apr	May	Jun	Jul	Aug	Sep	Oct	Nov	Dec	Year
Mean daily maximum °C (°F)	29.5 (85.1)	30.0 (86.0)	30.4 (86.7)	31.0 (87.8)	31.2 (88.2)	31.0 (87.8)	31.4 (88.5)	31.8 (89.2)	32.0 (89.6)	31.7 (89.1)	31.0 (87.8)	30.2 (86.4)	30.9 (87.7)
Daily mean °C (°F)	26.0 (78.8)	26.3 (79.3)	26.6 (79.9)	27.0 (80.6)	27.2 (81.0)	26.8 (80.2)	27.0 (80.6)	27.1 (80.8)	27.3 (81.1)	27.2 (81.0)	26.9 (80.4)	26.5 (79.7)	26.8 (80.3)
Mean daily minimum °C (°F)	22.5 (72.5)	22.7 (72.9)	22.8 (73.0)	23.0 (73.4)	23.2 (73.8)	22.6 (72.7)	22.6 (72.7)	22.5 (72.5)	22.7 (72.9)	22.7 (72.9)	22.8 (73.0)	22.8 (73.0)	22.7 (72.9)
Average rainfall mm (inches)	278 (10.9)	247 (9.7)	326 (12.8)	291 (11.5)	246 (9.7)	187 (7.4)	155 (6.1)	123 (4.8)	136 (5.4)	186 (7.3)	266 (10.5)	275 (10.8)	2,716 (106.9)
Source: Climate-Data.org

== Infrastructure ==
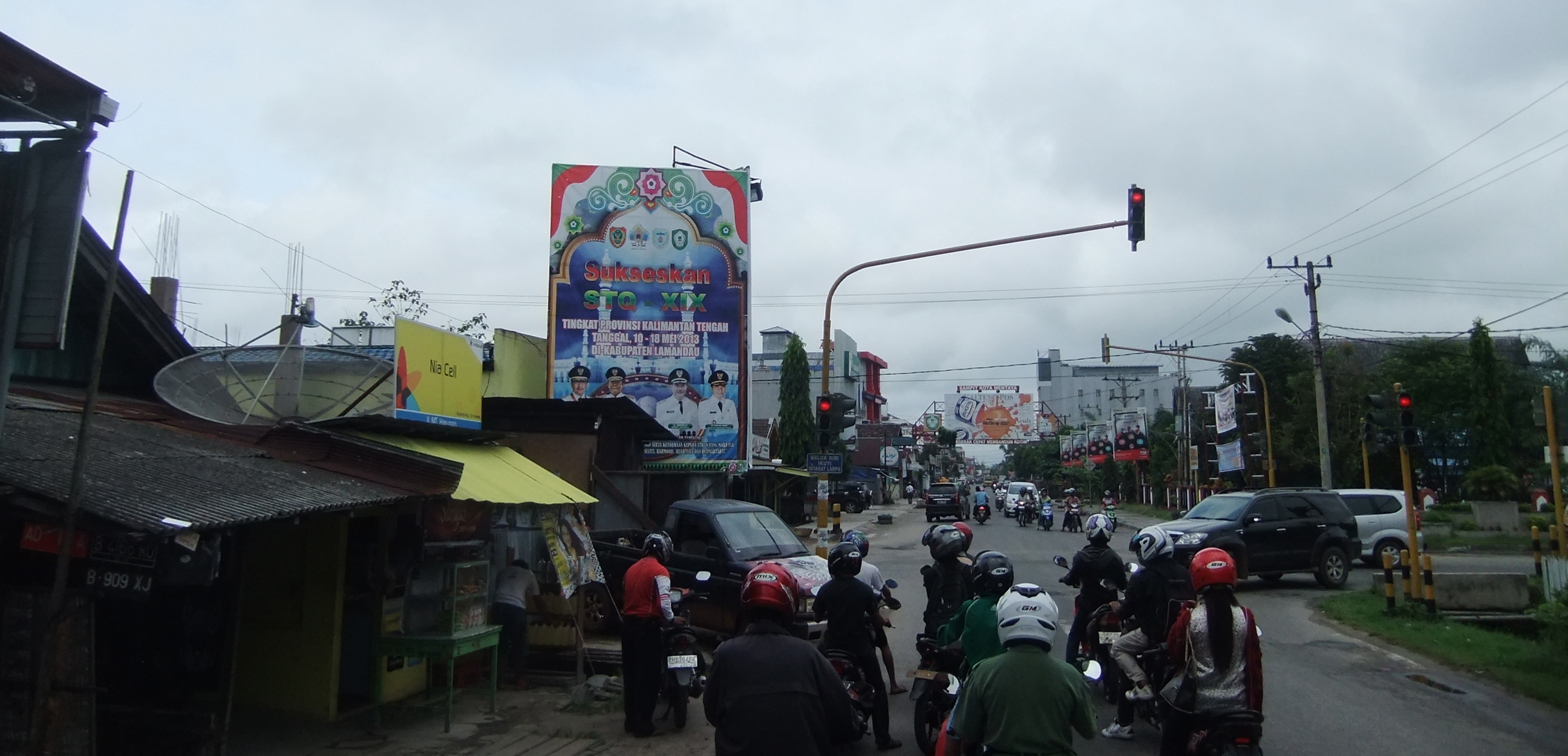
A busy main road in Sampit

=== Transportation ===
The town has a total of 474 kilometres of road, which mostly have been paved with asphalt. However, due to lack of enforcement of trucks weight moving on the road, around 18% of the roads are considered lightly to moderately damaged.

River transportation is an important part of the town's life, both intra-urban and to other cities such as Banjarmasin. Port of Sampit in Mentaya is used for both container and passenger. However, due to the river's relatively shallow depth, loading container in the port is dangerous and often caused the crane to damage parks, statues, and buildings around the port. Importance of the port for container and movement of goods have been reduced and now mostly used for passenger transportation only. Angkots, while they have a presence in the town, has been in sharp decline due to competition with ride-hailing online app services such as Gojek and Grab. In addition, there's also a local online ride-hailing application exclusive to Sampit named Pas-Jek. Other alternatives include bemo and rickshaw.

The city is served by H. Asan Airport.

=== Health and education ===
The town's main hospital, Dr. Murjani Sampit Regional Hospital is located in Mentawa Baru Hilir which from 2018 underwent a major expansion. A new four-storey building for the hospital was inaugurated in January 2021. There is one university in the town, Darwan Ali University, which is a private university. Several other higher education institutions such as Sampit Economy College and Teaching and Education College of Muhammadiyah also present in the town.

=== Others ===
Convenience store chains such as Indomaret have presence in the town. Other than that, there are also shopping malls in Sampit such as Borneo City Mall and Mentaya Shopping Center.
