= Babakan Madang =

- Town and District
- Location in Bogor Regency, Java and Indonesia Babakan Madang (Java) Babakan Madang (Indonesia)
- Coordinates: 6.593861°S 106.900444°E
- Country: Indonesia
- Province: West Java
- Regency: Bogor Regency
- Established: 26 May 1999 (Regional expansion from Citeureup and small part of Jonggol)

Government
  - Camat: Azzhahir

Area
  - Total: 78.23 km^{2} (30.20 sq mi)
- Elevation: 220 m (720 ft)
- Highest elevation: 1,515 m (4,970 ft)
- Lowest elevation: 168 m (551 ft)

Population (mid 2024 estimate)
  - Total: 128,425
  - Density: 1,642/km^{2} (4,252/sq mi)
- Time zone: UTC+7 (IWST)
- Area code: (+62) 251
- Vehicle registration: F
- Villages: 9
- Website: kecamatanbabakanmadang.bogorkab.go.id

Babakan Madang is a town and an administrative district (Indonesian: kecamatan) in the Bogor Regency, West Java, Indonesia. Because of the regency's recognition as part of Jakarta's larger conurbation, the district is often considered as one of Jakarta's outermost suburbs, although the closest city in the region to Babakan Madang is Bogor city, as it lies just a few kilometres east of that city, from which it is separated only by the regency's Sukaraja District.

Babakan Madang was previously part of Citeureup district before it was split off from the southern part of the district in 1999.

Babakan Madang District covers an area of 78.23 km^{2}. and had a population of 103,049 at the 2010 Census and 114,641 at the 2020 Census; the official estimate as at mid 2024 was 128,425 (comprising 66,250 males and 62,175 females). The administrative centre is at the town of Babakan Mandang, and the district is sub-divided into nine villages (desa), all sharing the postcode of 16810, as listed below with their areas and populations as at mid 2024.

Kode Wilayah	Name of kelurahan or desa	Area in km^{2}	Population mid 2024 estimate
32.01.05.2001	Cijayanti	14.07	19,417
32.01.05.2009	Bojong Koneng	13.01	17,148
32.01.05.2004	Karang Tengah	29.62	19,688
32.01.05.2002	Sumur Batu	4.84	9,381
32.01.05.2008	Babakan Madang (town)	3.24	10,346
32.01.05.2007	Citaringgul	3.57	8,983
32.01.05.2005	Cipambuan	2.01	6,137
32.01.05.2006	Kadumanggu	4.40	18,487
32.01.05.2003	Sentul	3.47	18,838
32.01.05	Totals	78.23	128,425

== History ==
Babakan Madang District was created from the southern part of Citeureup District in 1999.

== Features of the district ==
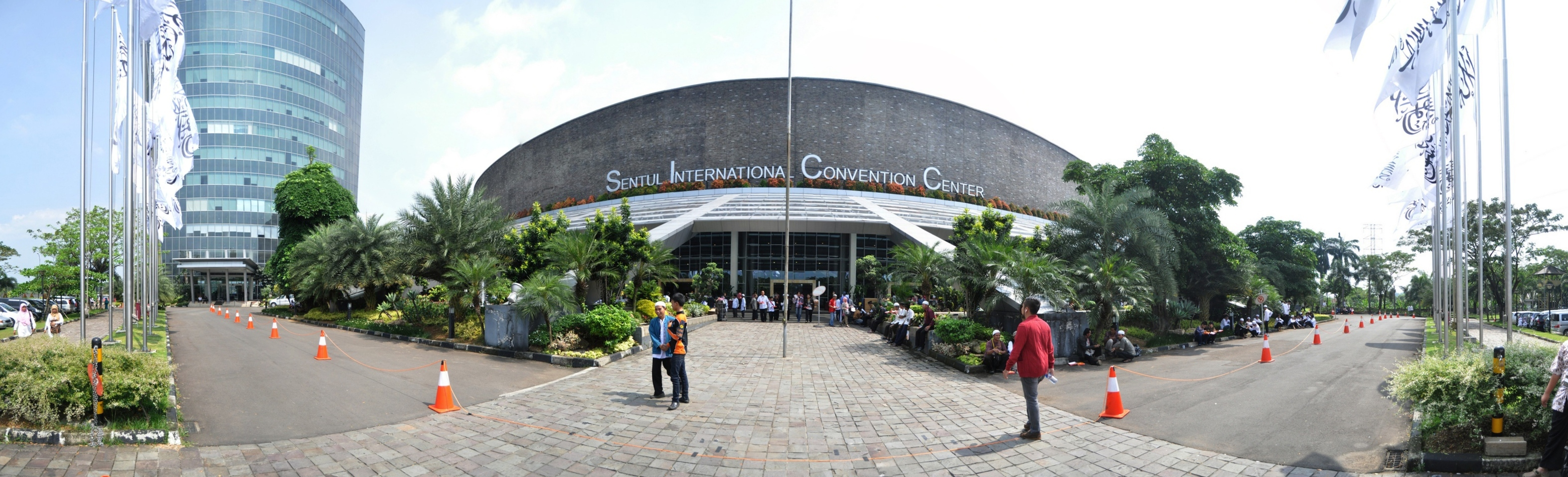
The front façade of the Sentul International Convention Center

Babakan Madang features a lot of new housing complexes and planned neighbourhoods built to serve commuters to Jakarta; with most of these projects being centred in an area now known as "Sentul". Out of all the many architectural and real estate projects that have ever taken place here, most were from the construction of "Sentul City".

Lying within these neighbourhoods and "Sentul City" itself, is the Sentul International Circuit, which has hosted international racing events in the past, namely in the years/seasons of 1996–97, 2005–07, and 2008. Also within the district is the large Sentul International Convention Center (or SICC for short), which became one of Greater Jakarta's largest and well-known commercial conference halls.

Overall, the main way to access both Sentul and Babakan Madang, is through the Jagorawi toll road, which is located on the district's western edge. It has direct access to both the capital city; that is Jakarta, as well as to Bogor and Ciawi to the south.
