= Taman Sari =

Taman Sari or Tamansari may refer to:

- Taman Sari, Jakarta, a district in Jakarta, Indonesia
- Taman Sari (Yogyakarta), a location in Yogyakarta, Indonesia
- Tamansari, Bandung, an area in Bandung, Indonesia
- Tamansari, Bogor, a district in Bogor Regency, West Java, Indonesia
