= Tenjo, Indonesia =

Tenjo
- Town and District
- Location in Bogor Regency, Java and Indonesia Tenjo (Java) Tenjo (Indonesia)
- Coordinates: 6°22′S 106°29′E
- Country: Indonesia
- Province: West Java
- Regency: Bogor Regency
- Established: 14 August 1992

Area
  - Total: 72.18 km^{2} (27.87 sq mi)
- Elevation: 51 m (167 ft)

Population (mid 2024 estimate)
  - Total: 81,761
  - Density: 1,133/km^{2} (2,934/sq mi)
- Time zone: UTC+7 (IWST)
- Area code: (+62) 251
- Vehicle registration: F
- Villages: 9
- Website: kecamatantenjo.bogorkab.go.id

Tenjo is a town and an administrative district (Indonesian: kecamatan) in the Bogor Regency of West Java Province, Indonesia and thus part of Jakarta's metropolitan area.

Tenjo District was previously part of the areas of Parung Panjang and Jasinga Districts before it was split off from the western and northern parts respectively of those districts on 14 August 1992.

Tenjo District covers an area of 72.18 km^{2}, and had a population of 66,077 at the 2010 Census and 73,272 at the 2020 Census; the official estimate as at mid 2024 was 81,761 (comprising 42,362 males and 39,399 females). The administrative centre is at the town of Singabraja, and the district is sub-divided into nine villages (desa), all sharing the postcode of 16370, as listed below with their areas and populations as at mid 2024.

Kode Wilayah	Name of desa	Area in km^{2}	Population mid 2024 estimate
32.01.23.2002	Ciomas	9.64	5,650
32.01.23.2001	Tapos	6.10	9,281
32.01.23.2003	Batok	13.00	14,124
32.01.23.2004	Babakan	12.55	11,965
32.01.23.2009	Bojong	8.37	10,800
32.01.23.2007	Singabraja	7.68	5,070
32.01.23.2005	Tenjo (town)	6.79	12,669
32.01.23.2006	Cilaku	5.02	8,346
32.01.23.2008	Singabangsa	3.03	3,856
32.01.23	Totals	72.18	81,761
