= Pamijahan =

- Town and District
- Location in Bogor Regency, Java and Indonesia Pamijahan (Java) Pamijahan (Indonesia)
- Coordinates: 6°41′00″S 106°39′20″E
- Country: Indonesia
- Province: West Java
- Regency: Bogor Regency
- Established: 23 August 1995

Area
  - Total: 80.83 km^{2} (31.21 sq mi)
- Elevation: 581 m (1,906 ft)

Population (mid 2024 estimate)
  - Total: 173,108
  - Density: 2,142/km^{2} (5,547/sq mi)
- Time zone: UTC+7 (IWST)
- Area code: (+62) 251
- Vehicle registration: F
- Villages: 15
- Website: kecamatanpamijahan.bogorkab.go.id

Pamijahan is a town and an administrative district (Indonesian: kecamatan) in the Bogor Regency, West Java, Indonesia and thus part of Jakarta's metropolitan area.

Pamijahan District was previously part of Cibungbulang District before it was split off from the northern part of that district on 23 August 1995.

Pamijahan District covers an area of 80.83 km^{2}, and had a population of 133,871 at the 2010 Census and 157,113 at the 2020 Census; the official estimate as at mid 2024 was 173,108 (comprising 89,392 males and 83,716 females). The administrative centre is at the town of Gunungsari, and the district is sub-divided into fifteen villages (desa), all sharing the postcode of 16812, as listed below with their areas and populations as at mid 2024.

Kode Wilayah	Name of desa	Area in km^{2}	Population mid 2024 estimate
32.01.17.2002	Cibunian	12.48	13,417
32.01.17.2001	Purwabakti	16.62	8,434
32.01.17.2015	Ciasmara	5.76	9,793
32.01.17.2013	Ciasihan	7.72	13,041
32.01.17.2014	Gunung Sari	6.83	16,351
32.01.17.2005	Gunung Bunder II	3.65	10,735
32.01.17.2010	Gunung Bunder I	3.30	10,432
32.01.17.2009	Cibening	3.46	15,452
32.01.17.2012	Gunung Picung	5.27	15,934
32.01.17.2011	Cibitung Kulon	2.44	7,892
32.01.17.2003	Cibitung Wetan	2.34	7,530
32.01.17.2008	Pamijahan (town)	3.99	14,464
32.01.17.2006	Pasarean	2.77	14,006
32.01.17.2004	Gunung Menyan	2.45	7,543
32.01.17.2007	Cimayang	1.75	8,084
32.01.17	Totals	80.83	173,108
