= Citeureup =

- Town and District
- Location in Bogor Regency, Java and Indonesia Citeureup (Java) Citeureup (Indonesia)
- Coordinates: 6.532226°S 106.900444°E
- Country: Indonesia
- Province: West Java
- Regency: Bogor Regency

Government
  - Camat: Tedjo Suryo Prayoga

Area
  - Total: 68.30 km^{2} (26.37 sq mi)
- Elevation: 136 m (446 ft)

Population (mid 2024 estimate)
  - Total: 228,820
  - Density: 3,350/km^{2} (8,677/sq mi)
- Time zone: UTC+7 (IWST)
- Area code: (+62) 251
- Vehicle registration: F
- Villages: 14
- Website: kecamatanciteureup.bogorkab.go.id

Citeureup is a town and an administrative district (Indonesian: kecamatan) in the Bogor Regency, West Java, Indonesia. It is a suburb to Jakarta, and is part of its metropolitan region, Jakarta Raya. It is also one of the districts that lies in between the city of Depok, and the city of Bogor.

Citeureup District originally covered a larger area, but on 26 May 1999 the southern half of the district was split away to create a separate Babakan Madang District. The reduced district covers an area of 68.30 km^{2}, and had a population of 198,380 at the 2010 Census and 214,668 at the 2020 Census; the official estimate as at mid 2024 was 228,820 (comprising 116,903 males and 111,917 females). The administrative centre is at the town of Puspanegara, and the district is sub-divided into two towns (kelurahan) - Puspanegara and Karang Asem Barat - and twelve villages (desa), all sharing the postcode of 16811, as listed below with their areas and populations as at mid 2024.

Kode Wilayah	Name of kelurahan or desa	Area in km^{2}	Population mid 2024 estimate
32.01.03.2011	Tangkil	6.11	1,475
32.01.03.2013	Hambalang	20.30	14,658
32.01.03.2004	Tajur	14.20	15,918
32.01.03.2014	Pasir Mukti	1.63	14,534
32.01.03.2012	Sukahati	5.56	13,790
32.01.03.2003	Leuwinutug	2.75	18,520
32.01.03.2005	Sanja	2.00	14,938
32.01.03.1007	Karang Asem Barat	2.69	22,959
32.01.03.2008	Karang Asem Timur	1.08	10,937
32.01.03.2009	Tarikolot	2.44	24,602
32.01.03.2010	Gunungsari	3.74	21,773
32.01.03.2002	Citeureup (town)	3.11	19,067
32.01.03.1006	Puspanegara	1.15	18,547
32.01.03.2001	Puspasari	1.54	17,102
32.01.03	Totals	68.30	228,820

== See also ==
- Bekasi river
