= Bojonggede =

- Town and District
- Location in Bogor Regency, Java and Indonesia Bojonggede (Java) Bojonggede (Indonesia)
- Coordinates: 6.479208°S 106.800139°E
- Country: Indonesia
- Province: West Java
- Regency: Bogor Regency
- Established: 5 May 1981

Government
  - Camat: Bambang Widodo Tawekal

Area
  - Total: 28.14 km^{2} (10.86 sq mi)
- Elevation: 140 m (460 ft)

Population (mid 2024 estimate)
  - Total: 286,995
  - Density: 10,200/km^{2} (26,410/sq mi)
- Time zone: UTC+7 (IWST)
- Area code: (+62) 251
- Vehicle registration: F
- Villages: 9
- Website: kecamatanbojonggede.bogorkab.go.id

Bojonggede (also can be spelled as Bojong Gede) is a town and an administrative district (Indonesian: Kecamatan) in the Bogor Regency of West Java Province, Indonesia. It is a suburb to Jakarta, and is part of its metropolitan region, Jakarta Raya (Greater Jakarta).

The district covers an area of 28.14 km^{2}, and had a population of 236,486 at the 2010 Census and 287,554 at the 2020 Census; the official estimate as at mid 2024 was 286,995 (comprising 145,000 males and 141,995 females). Thanks to its location being a suburb, Bojong Gede is a rather urbanized district, which also makes it densely populated. Like its neighbouring districts of Cibinong to the east and Tajurhalang to the west, it is one of the districts which lie between the city of Depok and the city of Bogor, both also part of Greater Jakarta. This attracts a rather large residential population for the people who would commute to the cities.

This district is served by Bojonggede railway station and Citayam railway station (located in Depok, near Pabuaran).

== History ==
Bojonggede District was established on 5 May 1981 from former parts of Depok District (formerly within Bogor Regency, but with another part now having become Depok city).

== Town and villages (Kelurahan and Desa) ==
The district of Bojonggede is divided into the urban town (kelurahan) of Pabuaran and eight "rural" villages (desa), listed below with their areas and their populations as at mid 2024, together with their postcodes.

Kode Wilayah	Name of kelurahan	Area in km^{2}	Population mid 2024 estimate	Post code
32.01.13.2002	Cimanggis	5.24	24,757	16920
32.01.13.2006	Waringin Jaya	1.73	19,077	16920
32.01.13.2005	Kedung Waringin	1.81	28,540	16923
32.01.13.2009	Bojonggede (town)	2.75	48,338	16922
32.01.13.2003	Susukan	3.40	27,663	16920
32.01.13.2001	Bojong Baru	3.25	26,236	16920
32.01.13.2008	Rawa Panjang	3.15	42,663	16920
32.01.13.1007	Pabuaran	2.48	40,322	16921
32.01.13.2004	Ragajaya	4.33	29,399	16920
32.01.13	Totals	28.14	286,995	
