= Jonggol =

- Town and District
- Nicknames: Bhutan van Java; Kota Seribu Curug
- Location in Bogor Regency, Java and Indonesia Jonggol (Java) Jonggol (Indonesia)
- Coordinates: 6.489835°S 107.042341°E
- Country: Indonesia
- Province: West Java
- Regency: Bogor Regency

Area
  - Total: 118.86 km^{2} (45.89 sq mi)
- Elevation: 295.32 m (968.9 ft)
- Highest elevation: 1,890 m (6,200 ft)
- Lowest elevation: 150 m (490 ft)

Population (mid 2025 estimate)
  - Total: 159,591
  - Density: 1,342.7/km^{2} (3,477.5/sq mi)
- Time zone: UTC+7 (IWST)
- Area code: (+62) 251
- Vehicle registration: F
- Villages: 14
- Website: kecamatanjonggol.bogorkab.go.id

Jonggol is a town and an administrative district (Indonesian: Kecamatan) in the Bogor Regency, West Java, Indonesia. The town is located 50 km to the southeast of Jakarta. The district is part of the Greater Jakarta metropolitan area, and is situated within the Kali Bekasi river basin. It covers a land area of 118.86 km^{2}, and had a population of 122,697 at the 2010 Census and 143,512 at the 2020 Census; the official estimate as at mid 2025 was 159,591 (comprising 80,405 males and 79,186 females). The district centre is at the town of Jonggol, and the district is sub-divided into 14 villages (desa), all sharing the postcode of 16830, as listed below with their areas and populations as at mid 2025. Besides being a district centre, Jonggol is now the centre of a vast tourist area in the southeast of the Jakarta Metropolitan Area which includes several neighbouring districts - Sukamakmur, Cariu, Tanjungsari, Cileungsi, and Klapanunggal.

Kode Wilayah	Name of kelurahan or desa	Area in km^{2}	Population mid 2025 estimate
32.01.06.2013	Sukajaya	11.82	26,729
32.01.06.2005	Sukanegara	6.40	4,738
32.01.06.2008	Cibodas	14.16	24,881
32.01.06.2011	Singasari	16.25	16,365
32.01.06.2003	Singajaya	11.53	6,792
32.01.06.2004	Sukasirna	11.45	14,218
32.01.06.2012	Balekambang	9.26	5,376
32.01.06.2010	Bendungan	6.54	4,855
32.01.06.2002	Sirnagalih	4.77	15,950
32.01.06.2009	Jonggol (town)	6.47	6,596
32.01.06.2001	Sukamaju	6.41	11,934
32.01.06.2006	Sukamanah	4.22	8,748
32.01.06.2007	Weninggalih	4.81	7,935
32.01.06.2014	Sukagalih	4.77	4,474
32.01.06	Totals	118.86	159,591

== History ==
Under Dutch administration, Jonggol was the centre of a wider administrative area (Kawedanan Jonggol), and after the proclamation of Independence it was stated that the kawedanan would be re-established as part of the proposed State of Pasundan. This was not done, but Jonggol was one of the areas subsequently considered in 2010 for new central administration (capital) of the Republic of Indonesia.

== Geography ==
Jonggol town is located about 50 kilometres (31 mi) southeast of Jakarta. The average elevation in the district is 295 metres, maximum 732 m (1.890 m in Mounth Baud, Sukamakmur, Jonggol District), and minimum 150 metres above sea level.

== Toll Road Access ==
Toll Road	Toll Gate	KM
Jagorawi Toll Road	Cibubur	21
Cimanggis-Cibitung Toll Road	Jatikarya	16
Padaleunyi Toll Road	Padalarang	92

== Climate ==
Jonggol has a tropical rainforest climate (Af) with heavy to very heavy rainfall year-round.

Climate data for Jonggol
Month	Jan	Feb	Mar	Apr	May	Jun	Jul	Aug	Sep	Oct	Nov	Dec	Year
Mean daily maximum °C (°F)	28.6 (83.5)	28.9 (84.0)	29.7 (85.5)	30.5 (86.9)	30.2 (86.4)	29.8 (85.6)	30.3 (86.5)	31.2 (88.2)	31.7 (89.1)	31.5 (88.7)	30.8 (87.4)	30.0 (86.0)	30.3 (86.5)
Daily mean °C (°F)	24.5 (76.1)	24.6 (76.3)	25.1 (77.2)	25.6 (78.1)	25.1 (77.2)	23.8 (74.8)	23.9 (75.0)	25.1 (77.2)	25.6 (78.1)	25.8 (78.4)	25.7 (78.3)	25.4 (77.7)	25.0 (77.0)
Mean daily minimum °C (°F)	20.9 (69.6)	21.2 (70.2)	21.8 (71.2)	21.4 (70.5)	20.5 (68.9)	19.8 (67.6)	20.3 (68.5)	20.8 (69.4)	21.3 (70.3)	21.5 (70.7)	21.8 (71.2)	21.4 (70.5)	21.1 (69.9)
Average rainfall mm (inches)	371 (14.6)	330 (13.0)	334 (13.1)	371 (14.6)	305 (12.0)	192 (7.6)	170 (6.7)	193 (7.6)	210 (8.3)	298 (11.7)	313 (12.3)	353 (13.9)	3,440 (135.4)
Source: Climate-Data.org

== Gallery ==
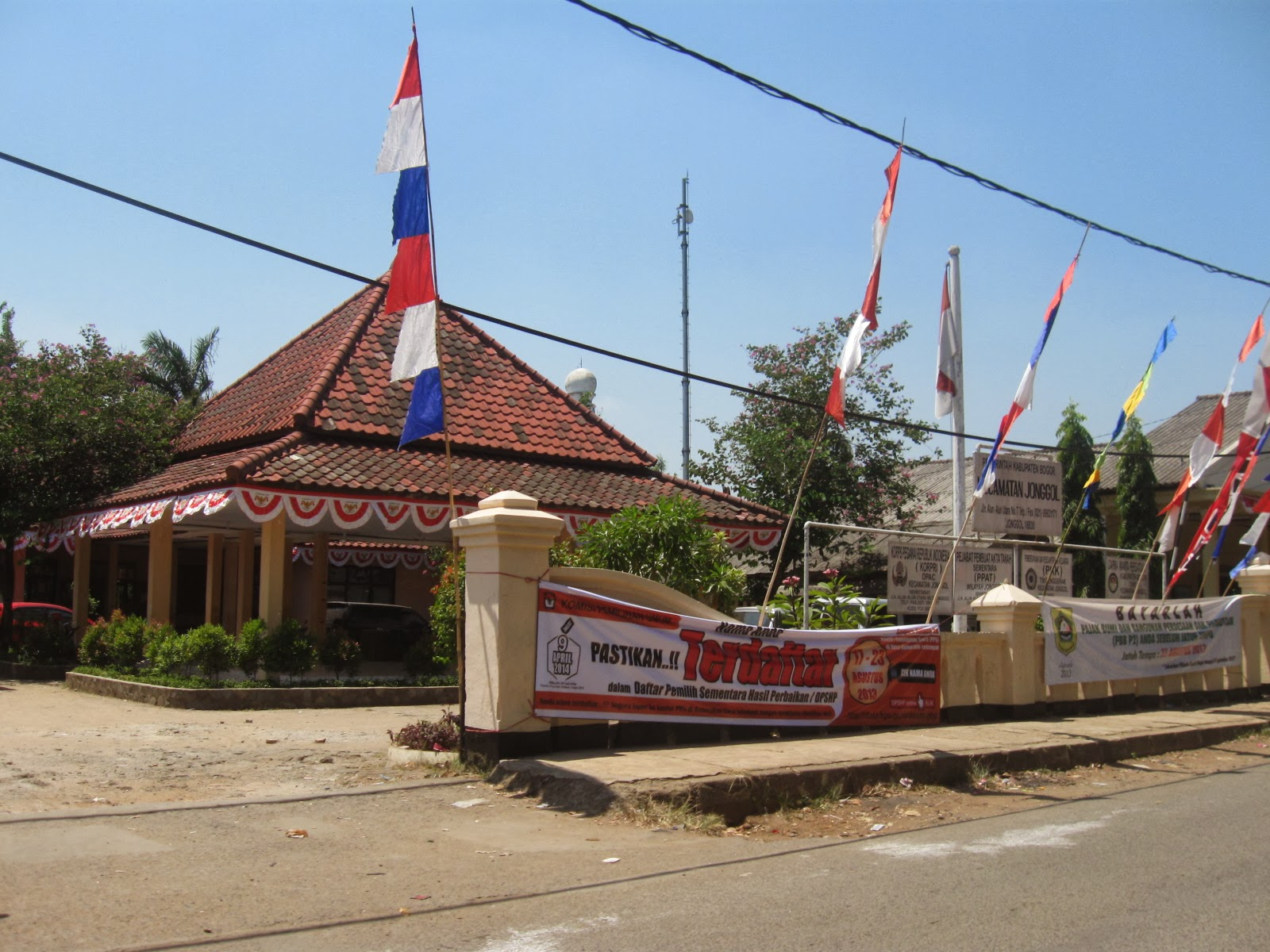
Administrative office of Jonggol District

== See also ==
- Bekasi river
