= Bogor Regency =

Regency in West Java, Indonesia

Bogor Regency Kabupaten Bogor
- Regency

other transcription(s)
  - Sundanese: ᮊᮘᮥᮕᮒᮨᮔ᮪ ᮘᮧᮌᮧᮁ
  - Betawi: Bogor Kabupatèn
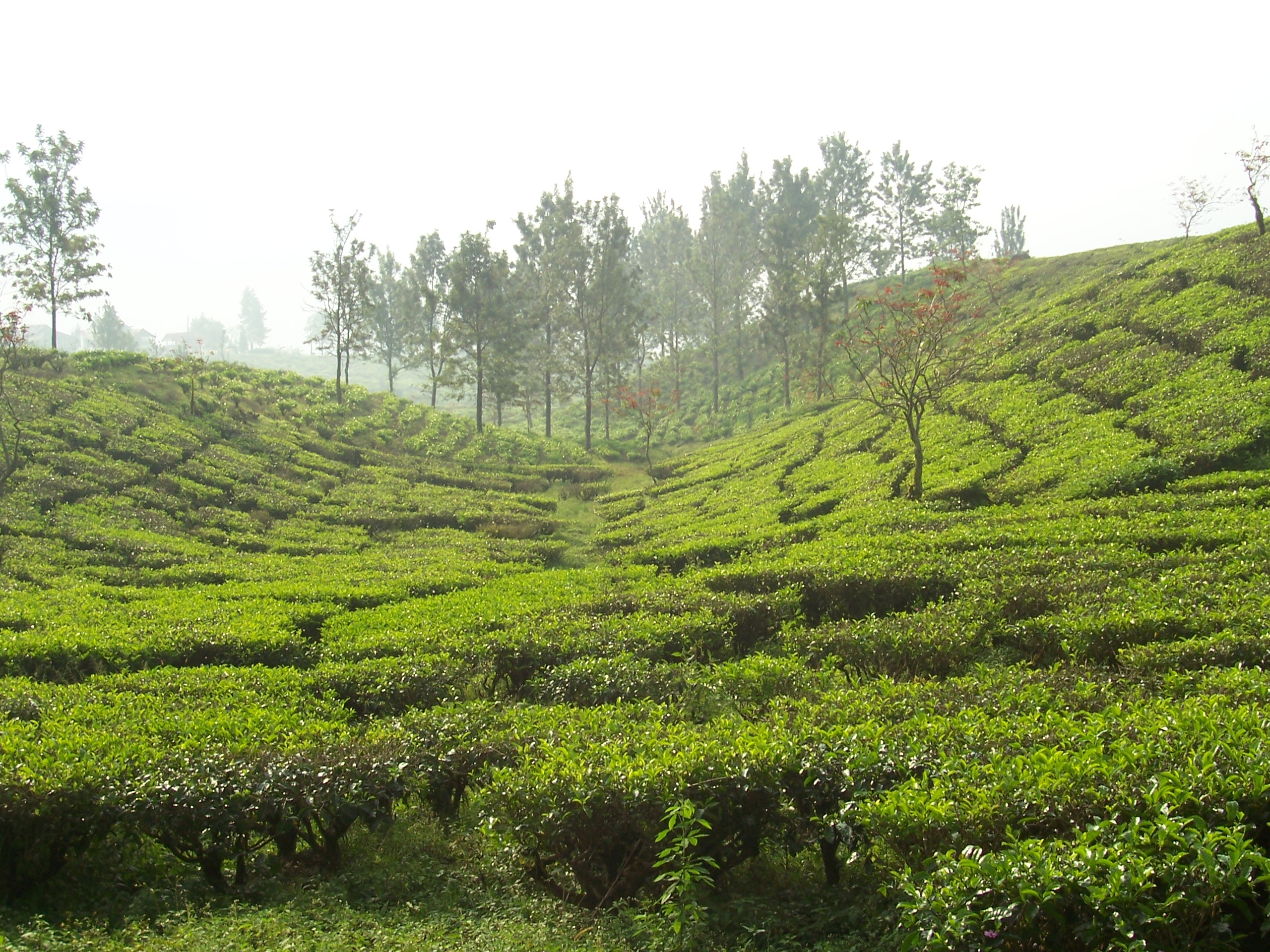
- Tea plantation in Puncak

- Coat of arms
- Mottoes: Prayoga Tohaga Sayaga ᮕᮢᮚᮧᮌ ᮒᮧᮠᮌ ᮞᮚᮌ (Foremost, Robust, Ready); Kuta Udaya Wangsa ᮊᮥᮒ ᮅᮓᮚ ᮝᮀᮞ (City of the dawn of the nation); Tegar Beriman (Steadfast in faith) (Note: Tegar Beriman is also an acronym of "Tertib, Segar, Bersih, Indah, Mandiri, Aman, dan Nyaman" (lit. 'Neat, Fresh, Clean, Beautiful, Self-reliant, Peaceful, and Comfortable'))
- Location within West Java

- Location in Java and Indonesia Bogor Regency (Indonesia)
- Coordinates: 6°28′49″S 106°49′29″E
- Country: Indonesia
- Province: West Java
- Regency seat: Cibinong

Government
  - Regent: Rudy Susmanto
  - Vice Regent: Ade Ruhandi

Area
  - Total: 2,991.78 km^{2} (1,155.13 sq mi)

Population (mid 2025 estimate)
  - Total: 5,721,618
  - Density: 1,912.45/km^{2} (4,953.21/sq mi)
- Time zone: UTC+7 (WIB)
- Area code: 0251
- Website: bogorkab.go.id

Bogor Regency (Indonesian: Kabupaten Bogor, Indonesian pronunciation: [kabuˌpat̪ɛn ˈbɔɡɔr]; Sundanese: ᮊᮘᮥᮕᮒᮨᮔ᮪ ᮘᮧᮌᮧᮁ, romanized: Kabupatén Bogor, Betawi: Kabupatén Bogor) is a landlocked regency (kabupaten) of West Java province in Indonesia, situated 40-50 kilometers south from the city of Jakarta as a national capital. Covering an area of 2,991.78 km^{2}, it is considered largely a bedroom community for Jakarta, and was home to 5,427,068 people at the 2020 census. The official estimate as of mid-2025 was 5,721,618 (comprising 2,930,563 males and 2,791,055 females). The town of Cibinong serves as the seat of the regency administration.

The area has witnessed significant population growth. Two areas formerly within the regency have been split off as autonomous cities; on 27 April 1999, the city of Depok was unified with some neighbouring districts of Bogor Regency to form an autonomous city of Depok (independent of the regency), while Bogor city had previously been formed as an autonomous city (similarly independent of the regency). Despite these subtractions, Bogor Regency remains the most populous regency in Indonesia.

== Origin of name ==
There are various opinions about the origin of the name Bogor itself. One opinion states that the name Bogor comes from Arabic language, namely Baqar which means cow on the grounds that there is evidence in the form of a statue of a cow in the Bogor Botanical Gardens. Another opinion states that the name Bogor comes from the word Bokor which means palm tree stump. The opinion above has its own basis and reasons for being believed to be true by each expert.

However, based on historical records, on 7 April 1752 the word "Bogor" appeared in a document and it was written as "Hoofd van de Negorij Bogor", which means Head of Kampung Bogor. In the documents it is also known that the village headquarters was located within the site of the Botanical Gardens itself, which began construction in 1817.

== History ==
In 1745, the forerunners of the Bogor community originally came from 9 settlement groups with 3 combined major groups, namely Bogor (central region), Tjibaroesa/Djonggol (eastern and northern regions) and Parung (western region) which was combined by the Governor-General Dutch Indies, Baron van Inhof into the core of the Bogor Regency community unit.

At that time, the Regent of Demang Wartawangsa tried to improve the quality of the environment and the welfare of the people based on agriculture by digging canals from Ciliwung River to Cimahpar and from Nanggewer to Kalimulya.

In 1908 Bogor Regency was composed of five kawedanan each led by a demang, namely Buitenzorg, Tjibaroesa, Cibinong, Parung, and Leuwiliang. Then, to facilitate district tasks, a number of under-districts were formed, each headed by an assistant demang.

The history of Bogor Regency had a close relationship with the era of the kingdom that once ruled in the region. In the previous four centuries, Sri Baduga Maharaja was known as the king who started the era of Pajajaran Kingdom, The king was famous for the teachings of his venerated ancestors who pursued prosperity. Since then successively recorded in the history of the kingdoms that once ruled in the region, namely;

- Tarumanagara Kingdom, ruled by 12 kings. Ruled from 358 to 669.
- Galuh Kingdom, ruled by 14 kings. Ruled from 516 to 852.
- Kingdom of Sunda, ruled by 28 kings. Reigned from 669 to 1333.
- Kingdom of Kawali, ruled by 6 kings. Ruled from 1333 to 1482.
- Pajajaran Kingdom, ruled from 1482 to 1579. The inauguration of the famous king as Sri Baduga Maharaja, became a special concern. At that time it was known as the Kuwedabhakti Ceremony. held on June 3, 1482. That date would have been later designated as the Anniversary of the City of Bogor and the Regency of Bogor.

After the Proclamation of Independence, to be precise in the era of United States of Indonesia or RIS, Bogor Regency was included in the proposed State of Pasundan area, then defined as SK Wali Negeri Pasundan Nomor 12 which stated that in the Bogor Regency, six kawedanan would be re-established, namely;

- Kawedanan Buitenzorg (covered Ciomas, Semplak, Kedunghalang, Tamansari, Cijeruk, Cigombong, Caringin, Ciawi, Cisarua and Megamendung Districts; note that Semplak and Kedunghalang Districts would subsequently be included in the modern Bogor City areas)
- Kawedanan Cibinong (covered Cibinong, Bojonggede, Tajurhalang, Sukaraja, Citeureup, and Babakan Madang Districts)
- Kawedanan Parung (covered Parung, Gunungsindur, Kemang, Rumpin, Rancabungur and Ciseeng Districts, and Depok City)
- Kawedanan Djonggol (covered Jonggol, Gunung Putri, Klapanunggal, Cileungsi, Sukamakmur, Cariu, and Tanjungsari Districts; note that two further Districts - Cibarusah and Jatisampura - would later be moved to Bekasi Regency, while Cikalongkulon District would be moved into Cianjur Regency and Pangkalan District would be moved to Karawang Regency)
- Kawedanan Leuwiliang (covered Leuwisadeng, Leuwiliang, Cibungbulang, Ciampea, Pamijahan, Tenjolaya and Dramaga Districts)
- Kawedanan Jasinga (covered Jasinga, Sukajaya, Tenjo, Parungpanjang, Nanggung, and Cigudeg Districts).

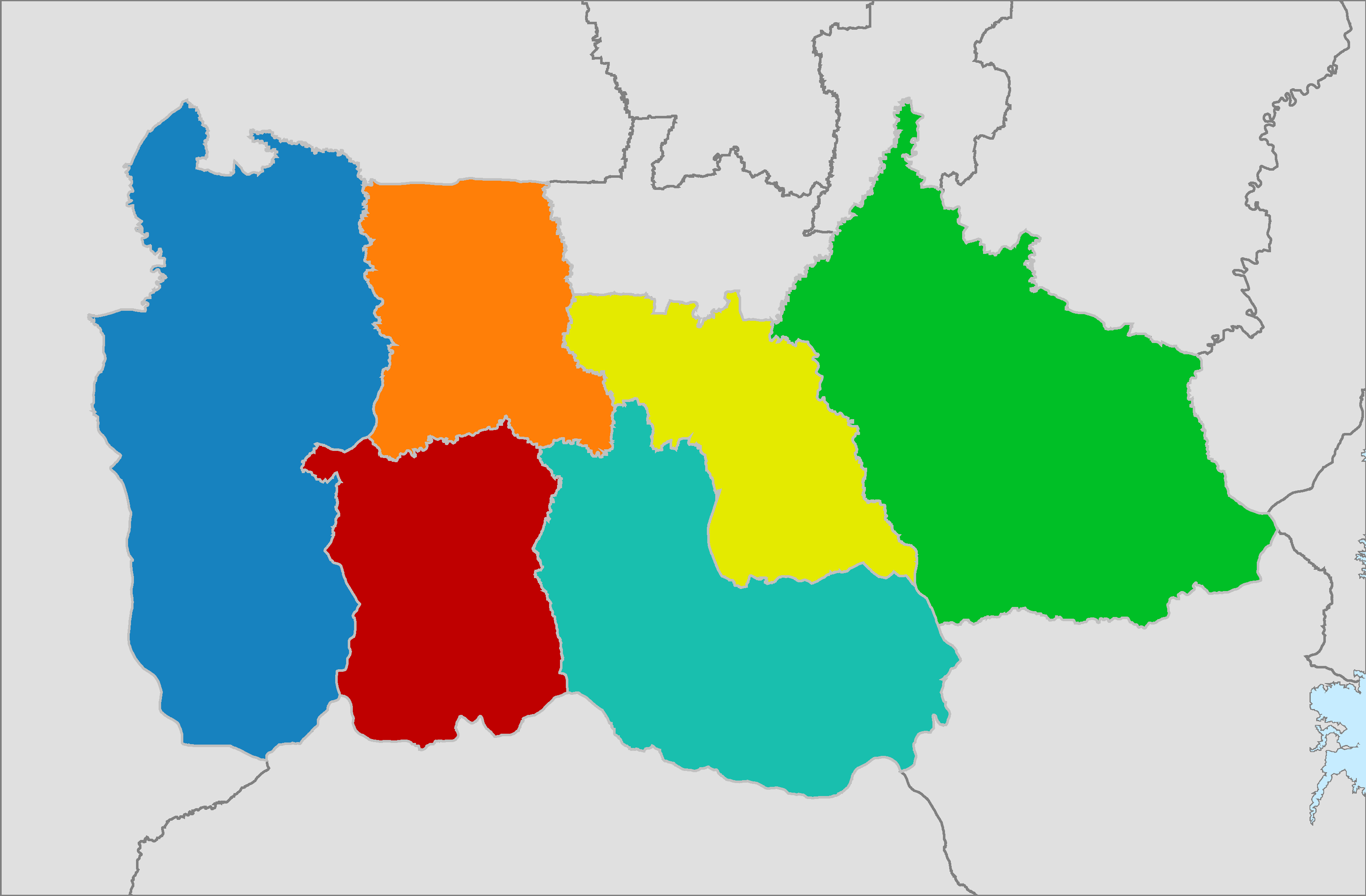
Intended division of Bogor Regency (prior to the creation of Bogor City as an independent administration) into six areas: Kawedanan Jasinga (blue), Kawedanan Parung (orange), Kawedanan Leuwiliang (red), Kawedanan Cibinong (yellow), Kawedanan Buitenzorg (tosca), Kawedanan Jonggol/Tjibaroesa (green). This map excludes the districts transferred to adjacent Regencies in the 1950s, as well as Depok City.

The kawedanan were never re-established. However, in the 1950s, in line with the restructuring policy of regional autonomy, particularly with regard to organization and territory, Bogor Regency lost a lot of territory. The area that lost the most territory was Kawedanan Jonggol, from which Cibarusah District and Jatisampurna District were transferred to Bekasi Regency (Jatisampurna became in turn part of the new Bekasi City when that was separated from Bekasi Regency on 16 December 1996), while Cikalongkulon District was transferred to Cianjur Regency and Pangkalan District was transferred to Karawang Regency.

In 1975, the Central Government instructed that Bogor Regency should have a Government Center in its own Regency area. On this basis, the Regional Government of Bogor Regency conducted research in several areas of Bogor Regency to become a candidate for the capital as well as to act as the center of government. Alternative locations that were to be considered included Ciawi District, Leuwiliang District, Parung District, Semplak District and Cibinong District.

The results of further research indicated that the location submitted to the Central Government for approval as a candidate for the regency capital was Rancamaya (currently a part of Bogor City). However, the Central Government considered that Rancamaya was still relatively close to the Government Center Bogor City and it was feared that it would be swallowed up by the regional expansion and development of Bogor City.

Considering the plans at that date for the establishment of Depok as a separate administrative City and for a putative Jonggol Regency, which had been discussed by the Minister of Home Affairs Amir Machmud with the Governor of West Java, the Regional Government of Bogor Regency took one alternative area, namely Kemang which was the most midpoint for the districts in Bogor Regency if the Administrative City of Depok was formed and Jonggol Regency was separated from Bogor Regency.

In the plenary session of the Bogor Regency DPRD in 1980, the village of Kemang was no longer to be considered as a candidate for the capital city of Bogor Regency. This was due to the limited availability of land owned by the district government and to minimal infrastructure, pending the debate on the formation of Jonggol Regency which is still considered raw. Finally, it was determined that the candidate for the capital city of Bogor Regency should be located in Tengah Village (now Tengah Kelurahan, in Cibinong District).

Government Regulation No. 6 of 1982 confirmed that the capital city of the Bogor Regency Government Center would be located in Tengah Village, Cibinong District. On 5 October 1985 the groundbreaking ceremony was held by the then Regent of Bogor Regency.

Considering the vast area of Bogor Regency plus the rapid population growth which is due to the geographical location of Bogor Regency as a buffer zone for Jakarta, several debates emerged regarding regional expansion based on regional development. In 1978, the Minister of Home Affairs Amir Machmud proposed the establishment of an administrative city of Depok which would include the District of Depok as well as other districts bordering Jakarta, especially those affected by the construction of Perumnas in the region. It was planned that administrative city of Depok would be made an organized residential area for workers in Jakarta.

The Governor of West Java, Aang Kunaefi, also proposed to the Minister of Home Affairs (Amir Machmud) the establishment of an area in the former Kawedanan Jonggol which has partially been to other districts to be unified as District Level II Regions. The Jonggol area and its surroundings were considered suitable, because the area is quite large, has abundant natural wealth, and has the potential as a new residential area, industry, and tourism.

The area proposed as part of the expansion was formerly part of the territory of Kawedanan Jonggol, including, among others, the areas of Jonggol, Gunung Putri, Cileungsi and Cibubur. Also considered were areas from outside Bogor Regency (such as parts of Bekasi Regency, namely Cibarusah District and Pondok Gede District (southern area)) and part of Karawang Regency (namely Pangkalan).

In 1981, the status of Depok District was finally upgraded from district to administrative city based on Government Regulation Number 43 of 1981. Depok Administrative City was headed by the Administrative Mayor. Meanwhile, the idea of forming a separate Jonggol Regency was not implemented.

In 1994, President Suharto was interested in making one of the Bogor Regency's areas, namely Jonggol District (at that time including Sukamakmur, Cariu and Babakan Madang). as the location for the new national capital to replace Jakarta, because Jonggol is located only 40 km southeast of Jakarta.

Post-reformation is in line with the policy of eliminating autonomous regions of Administrative Cities throughout Indonesia. The government through Law Number 15 of 1999 increased the status of Depok to that of a municipality. Thus Depok city was officially separated from Bogor Regency and exercised its own autonomy. Provisional plans and preparations for moving the nation's capital to Jonggol sank along with the fall of Suharto in 1998.

== Geographics ==
=== Borders ===
Bogor Regency is bordered by Tangerang Regency, the cities of South Tangerang, Depok and Bekasi, and finally Bekasi Regency, all to the north, Lebak Regency (in Banten Province) to the west, Sukabumi Regency to the south, Cianjur Regency to the southeast, Karawang Regency and Purwakarta Regency (with the shortest border) to the east; and this regency it fully encircles Bogor City, although the Bogor City latter is administratively are independent from that regency.

=== Geographical Conditions ===
Bogor Regency has several mountain ranges, Halimun Salak Mountains in the west, Gede Pangrango Mountains in the south, Jonggol Mountains in the east - southeast, Sanggabuana Mountains in the far east and Cibinong Karst Mountains in the north. In addition, Bogor has several popular mountain peaks. Such as, Mount Pangrango (3019 m), Mount Salak (2211 m), Mount Baud / Puncak Jonggol (1890 m), Mount Halimun (1900 m), Mount Kencana (1803 m), and Mount Batu Jonggol (875 m).

== Hydrology ==
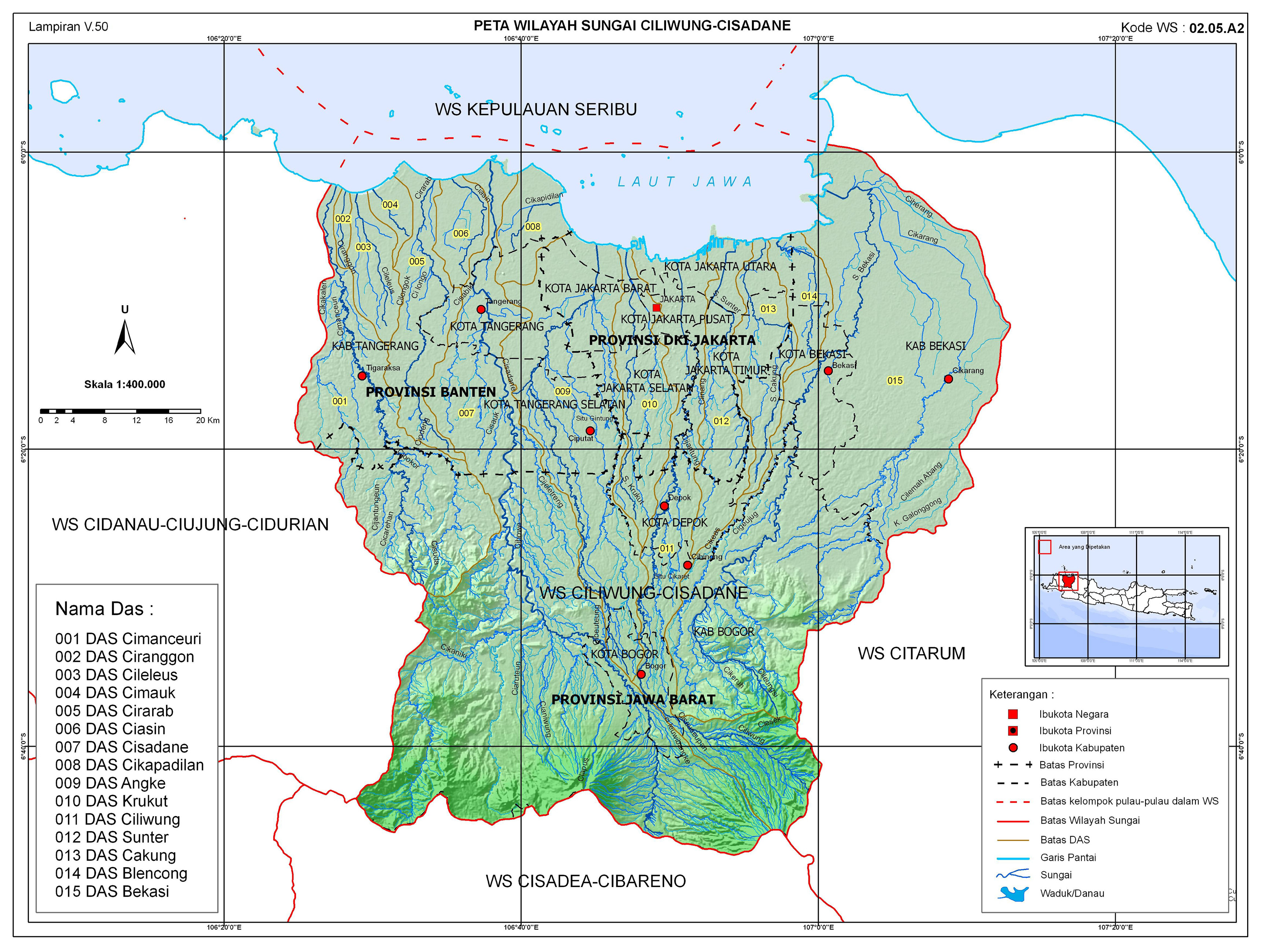
The Ciliwung-Cisadane river region, comprises multiple river basins, covers the regions of Jakarta, Bogor, Depok, Tangerang, and Bekasi, under the authority of BBWS Ciliwung-Cisadane (water resources management unit).

The area of Bogor Regency encompasses several river basins and serves as the upper part for some river basins, including the Bekasi basin (Bekasi River), Ciliwung basin (Liwung River), Angke basin (Angke river), and Cisadane basin (Sadane River). Many of the tributaries within these river basins originate in the Bogor Regency area. Their flows merge into larger streams, ultimately flowing and emptying into Jakarta Bay. Almost the entire regency comes under the authority of the BB Wilayah Sungai Ciliwung-Cisadane (water resources management unit). Note that the "Ci" prefix translates as "River" in the Sundanese language, as does "Sungai" in Javanese/Indonesian.

== Demographics ==
In the 2010 census the regency (minus the autonomous cities) counted 4,770,744 people, of which 2,450,426 were male. The 2020 census showed this had grown to 5,427,068, and the official estimate for mid 2025 showed this had risen further to 5,721,618. The regency is by far the most populous in Indonesia, with a population which is roughly the same size as the population of Finland. Given that the regency covers 2,991.78 km^{2} after the separation of Bogor and Depok cities, the density in 2025 stands at 1,912people per km^{2}.

Historical population
Year	Pop.	±%
1971	1,668,978	—
1980	2,493,843	+49.4%
1990	3,736,870	+49.8%
2000^{[*]}	3,508,826	−6.1%
2010	4,770,704	+36.0%
2020	5,427,068	+13.8%
2025	5,721,618	+5.4%
Source: Bogor Regency Census population (2025 figure is estimate).

.

If the two cities had not been separated from the regency, the regency would have had the following area and population, listed below with their populations according to the official estimates for mid-2025 as well as those projected for mid 2026.

Name of City or regency	Area (km^{2})	Pop'n estimate mid-2025	Pop'n projected mid 2026
Bogor City	111.17	1,083,776	1,089,180
Depok City	199.91	2,167,961	2,173,250
Bogor Regency	2,991.78	5,721,618	5,760,940
Totals	3,302.86	8,973,355	9,023,370

=== Ethnic groups ===
Based on official data from Badan Pusat Statistik for Bogor Regency for mid 2025, the population of Bogor Regency was 5,721,618 people, with an average density of 1,912 people/km^{2}. Bogor Regency is an administrative area at the level of Regency; as such, it has the largest regency population in West Java and in Indonesia as a whole. The original inhabitants of Bogor Regency and West Java are generally Sundanese. Another ethnic group that is quite prominent is the Javanese, who are immigrants from the middle and east of Java Island, and some Betawi people, and also other immigrant ethnic groups including the Cirebonese, Batak, Tionghoa, Minangkabau, Bantenese.

Basede on data from the 2000 Indonesian Population Census, the following is the population size of Bogor Regency based on ethnicity;

No.	Ethnic groups	Population (2000)	%
1	Sundanese	2,928,415	83.62%
2	Javanese	224,037	6.40%
3	Betawi	162,529	4.64%
4	Batak	22,053	0.63%
5	Minangkabau	17,445	0.50%
6	Tionghoa	9,123	0.26%
7	Bantenese	1,995	0.06%
8	Cirebonese	1,939	0.05%
9	Other ethnicity	134,562	3.84%
Bogor Regency		3,502,098	100.00%

=== Languages ===
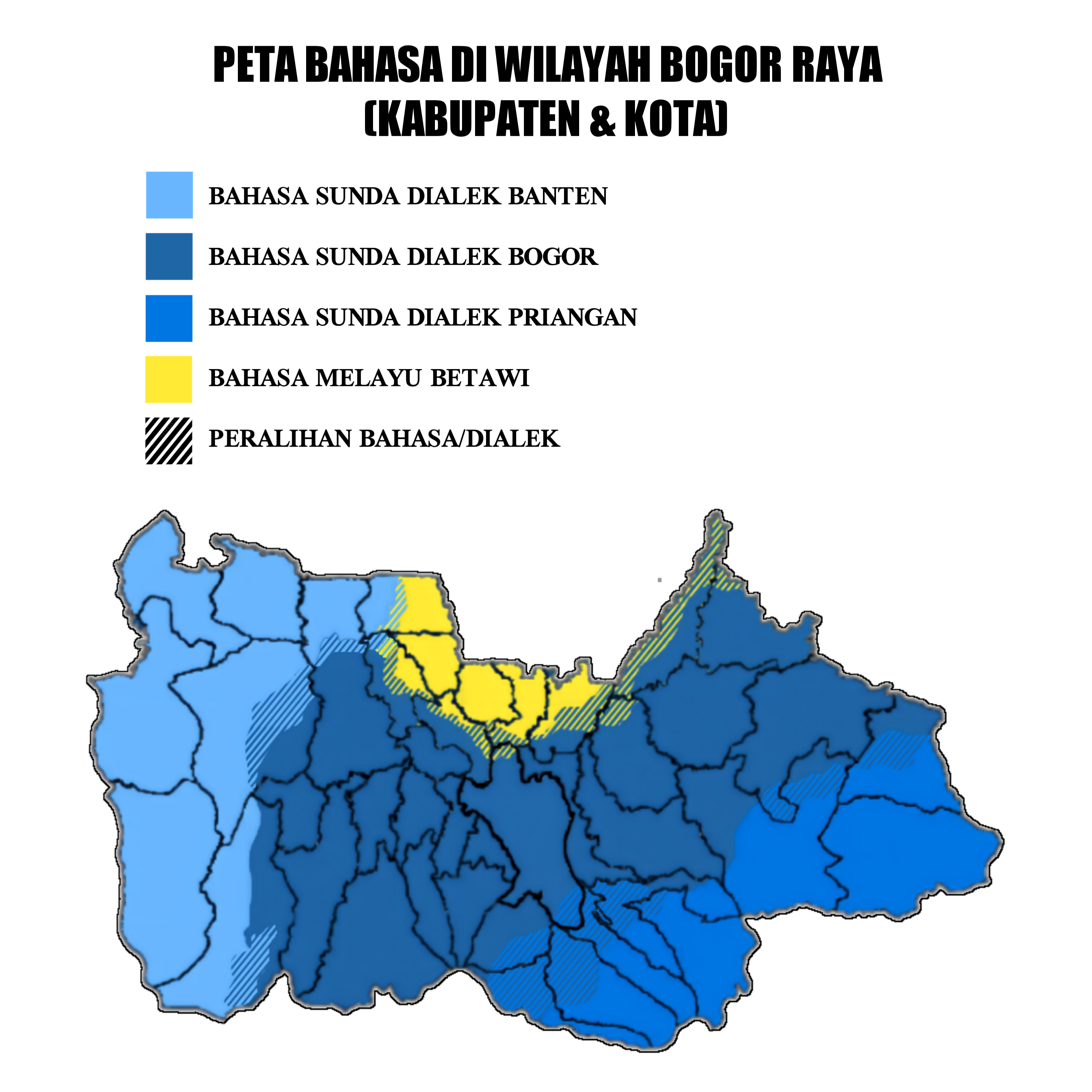
Map of languages and dialects distribution in Greater Bogor (regency and city).

Sundanese is used as the main language in almost all of Bogor Regency. This language is a lingua franca, especially in the village areas. The Sundanese language used in Bogor Regency is mainly divided into three dialects, the Bogor Sundanese dialect (Northern Sundanese) is used in the central and eastern regions of Bogor Regency; Banten Sundanese dialect is used in the Greater Jasinga area in the western part of Bogor Regency, where it is known as basa Sunda Jasinga (Jasinga Sundanese), and in the northern part of Bogor district, especially in the western part of Gunungsindur and the northern part of Rumpin; and the Priangan Sundanese dialect which is used in the southern and southeastern parts bordering Cianjur Regency and Sukabumi Regency.

Betawi language is also spoken in Bogor Regency, a Malay-based creole language with influences from other local languages, especially Sundanese. In Bogor Regency, this language is spoken in the north central part which borders the Depok and South Tangerang cities. The distribution area includes the districts of Bojonggede, Tajurhalang, Kemang (northern and eastern parts), Cibinong (northern part), Citeureup (northern part), Gunung Putri (northern part), Gunungsindur (eastern part), Parung, Ciseeng (eastern part), and Sukaraja (northern part), especially in the villages of West and East Cilebut, where the language there is a mixture of Sundanese and Betawi, known as the bahasa Cilebut (Cilebut language).

== Nature reserves (cagar alam) ==
Within Bogor Regency the following nature reserves exist:

- Yanlappa
- Gunung Pancar
- Telaga Warna
- Pancoran Mas

== Administration ==
Bogor Regency comprises 40 administrative districts (Kecamatan), listed below with their areas and populations at the 2010 census and the 2020 census, together with the mid-2025 official estimates. The table also includes the locations of the district administrative centres, the number of administrative villages in each district (totaling 416 rural desa and 19 urban kelurahan), and their postal code(s). The districts are here grouped into five parts, which have no administrative significance (although the East "part" coincides with the proposed "East Bogor Regency", and the Northwest and Southwest "parts" together coincide with the proposed "West Bogor Regency") but show very approximate geographical locations within the regency.

Kode Wilayah	Name of District (kecamatan)	Area in km^{2}	Pop'n 2010 census	Pop'n 2020 census	Pop'n mid 2025 Estimate	Admin centre	No. of villages	Post code
32.01.21	Nanggung	157.93	84,015	98,492	105,136	Parakan Muncang	11	16650
32.01.14	Leuwiliang	92.27	113,280	124,670	129,074	Leuwimekar	11	16640
32.01.39	Leuwisadeng	36.07	70,847	77,382	79,822	Leuwisadeng	8	16641
32.01.17	Pamijahan	125.17	133,871	157,113	167,802	Gunungsari	15	16812
32.01.16	Cibungbulang	37.70	125,177	145,706	155,001	Cimanggu II	15	16630
32.01.15	Ciampea	33.98	147,130	168,359	177,624	Bojong Rangkas	13	16620
32.01.40	Tenjolaya	36.33	54,887	63,645	67,580	Tapos I	7	16371
32.01.30	Dramaga	25.57	100,679	110,374	114,059	Dramaga	10	16680
	Sub-totals for Southwest; Part of Regency	545.02	829,886	945,741	996,098		166	
32.01.29	Ciomas	17.88	149,167	170,486	179,765	Pagelaran	11 ^{(a)}	16610
32.01.31	Tamansari	39.26	91,985	108,913	116,821	Tamansari	8	16611
31.01.28	Cijeruk	47.99	78,634	91,662	97,577	Cipelang	9	16740
32.01.38	Cigombong	46.54	88,309	97,651	101,333	Cigombong	9	16110
32.01.27	Caringin	77.89	114,229	131,012	138,376	Cimande Hilir	12	16730
32.01.24	Ciawi	47.06	102,994	114,853	119,671	Bendungan	13	16720
32.01.25	Cisarua	71.04	112,655	127,096	133,174	Leuwimalang	10 ^{(b)}	16750
32.01.26	Megamendung	63.42	96,887	107,137	111,177	Sukamaju	12	16770
32.01.04	Sukaraja	43.49	173,245	206,323	221,927	Cimandala	13	16711
32.01.05	Babakan Madang	88.58	103,049	114,641	119,312	Babakan Mandang	9	16810
	Sub-totals for South Part of Regency	543.15	1,111,154	1,269,774	1,339,133		106	
32.01.09	Sukamakmur	182.94	74,578	85,565	90,390	Sukamakmur	10	16831
32.01.08	Cariu	84.81	46,186	51,619	53,842	Cariu	10	16840
32.01.36	Tanjungsari	147.27	50,014	57,027	60,062	Tanjungsari	10	16841
32.01.06	Jonggol	134.38	122,697	143,512	153,024	Jonggol	14	16830
32.01.07	Cileungsi	70.08	276,369	288,347	307,554	Cileungsi	12	16820
32.01.32	Klapanunggal (Kelapa Nunggal)	95.81	95,025	127,561	145,391	Kembang Kuning	9	16710
32.01.02	Gunung Putri	60.99	329,918	297,724	294,633	Wanaherang	10	16960: 16969
	Sub-totals for East Part of Regency	776.28	994,787	1,051,355	1,104,896		75	
32.01.03	Citeureup	72.32	198,380	214,668	220,441	Puspanegara	14 ^{(c)}	16811
32.01.01	Cibinong (regency capital)	47.08	326,519	363,424	378,321	Cirimekar	13 ^{(d)}	16911: 16918
32.01.13	Bojonggede	28.93	236,486	287,554	312,428	Bojonggede	9 ^{(e)}	16920 ^{(f)}
32.01.37	Tajurhalang	30.38	97,255	123,454	136,954	Tajurhalang	7	16320
32.01.12	Kemang	33.09	92,401	104,872	110,207	Kemang	9 ^{(g)}	16310
32.01.34	Rancabungur	23.18	50,052	60,711	65,884	Rancabungur	7	16311
32.01.10	Parung	27.74	112,529	123,078	127,044	Warujaya	9	16330
32.01.33	Ciseeng	39.91	98,227	110,592	115,766	Cibentang	10	16120
32.01.11	Gunungsindur	48.56	102,998	126,834	138,651	Gunungsindur	10	16340
	Sub-totals for North Part of Regency	351.19	1,314,847	1,515,187	1,605,696		88	
32.01.18	Rumpin	139.07	129,150	146,007	153,143	Rumpin	14	16350
32.01.22	Cigudeg	179.30	117,278	133,931	141,165	Cigudeg	15	16660
32.01.35	Sukajaya	166.24	55,671	66,922	72,309	Sukajaya	11	16661
32.01.19	Jasinga	137.54	93,078	106,343	112,111	Pamagersari	16	16670
32.01.23	Tenjo	83.03	66,077	73,272	76,138	Singabraja	9	16370
32.01.20	Parung Panjang	70.98	110,004	118,176	120,929	Parung Panjang	11	16360
	Sub-totals for Northwest; Part of Regency	776.16	571,258	644,651	675,795	Cibinong	166	
	Totals for South, East and North parts of Regency	1,670.60	3,370,791	3,836,676	4,049,725		269	
	Totals for Southwest and Northwest Parts of Regency	1,321.18	1,401,144	1,590,392	1,671,893	Cibinong	166	

Notes: (a) including the kelurahan of Padasuka. (b) including the kelurahan of Cisarua. (c) includes the 2 kelurahan of Karang Asem Barat and Puspanegara.
(d) comprises all 13 kelurahan in Cibining District (Cibinong, Cirimekar, Ciriung, Harapan Jaya, Karadenan, Nanggewer, Nanggewer Mekar, Pabuaran, Pabuaran Mekar, Pakansari, Pondok Rajeg, Sukahati, and Tengah).
(e) including the kelurahan of Pabuaran. (f) apart from kelurahan of Pabuaran (which has post code of 16921), and desa of Bojonggede (16922) and Kedung Waringin (16923). (g) including the kelurahan of Atang Senjaya.

The westernmost fourteen districts which were proposed in 2013 to be split off to form the new "West Bogor Regency" are those listed as "Southwest" and "Northwest" in the table above. The twenty-six districts in the east of the Regency (which would have remained part of Bogor Regency) are listed as "South", "East" and "North" in the table above. However, separate plans were also under discussion at that time to split off the seven districts listed as "East" in the table above to form a new "East Bogor Regency"; this would equate to reviving the former proposal to create a separate East Bogor Regency which was dropped in 1998.

The above table excludes the independent cities of Bogor and Depok, whose component districts are listed below with their populations according to the mid-2025 official estimates:

- Bogor Selatan (213,862)
- Bogor Timur (108,040)
- Bogor Utara (193,240)
- Bogor Tengah (95,315)
- Bogor Barat (242,997)
- Tanah Sareal (230,322)
- Total Bogor City (1,083,776)
- Sawangan (206,515)
- Bojongsari (151,911)
- Pancoran Mas (254,370)
- Cipayung (190,849)
- Sukmajaya (253,712)
- Cilodong (187,319)
- Cimanggis (247,999)
- Tapos (279,577)
- Beji (168,484)
- Limo (127,509)
- Cinere (99,716)
- Total Depok City (2,167,961)

Bogor Regency, together with Bekasi Regency and the cities of Bogor, Depok and Bekasi, are often collectively grouped as "BODEBEK" (an acronym of the names) and together constitute precisely those parts of West Java Province that lie within the Greater Jakarta metropolitan area or Jabodetabek (an acronym of Jakarta–Bogor–Depok–Tangerang–Bekasi).

== Sports ==
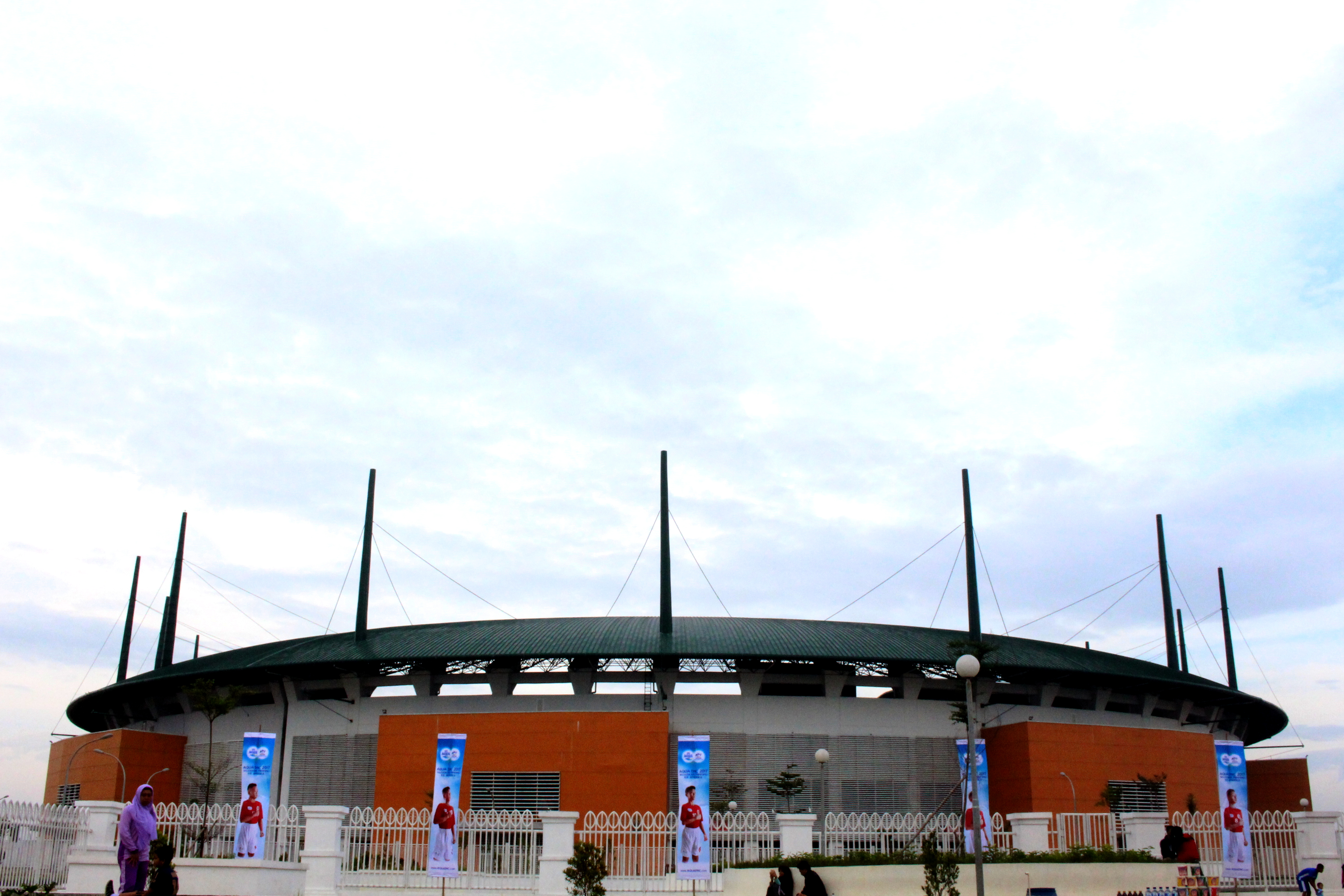
Pakansari Stadium seen from the front.

Bogor Regency has good sports facilities. In Bogor Regency, there are also several Sports Centers located in Cibinong and other districts. Besides Sports Centers, Bogor Regency also has several stadiums, for example Pakansari Stadium and Persikabo Stadium are stadiums which are located in the administrative center of Bogor Regency, namely Cibinong.

The association football team representing Bogor Regency in Liga 1 is Persikabo 1973, which was formed by the merger of PS TIRA and Persikabo Bogor. The women's football club in Bogor Regency is Persikabo Kartini which is a women's team from Persikabo 1973. Persikabo 1973 has several support groups, for example, Kabomania and Ultras Persikabo Curva Sud.

Bogor Regency also has representatives in Proliga which is the highest division in the volleyball competition in Indonesia, namely Bogor LavAni, which is a team founded by former president of Indonesia Susilo Bambang Yudhoyono on 1 December 2019, and made its debut in 2022 and won the title in its first season. The team is based in LavAni Sports Center, Gunung Putri.

== Tourism ==
In Sukajadi village, Tamansari District there are three waterfalls which can be easily reached by local tourists using Angkot 03 from Bogor to Ciapus in about 45 minutes. They are Curug (Waterfall) Daun, Curug Nangka and Curug Kawung. About 8 kilometres from the gate there is another waterfall in Gunung Malang village, Gunung Malang district. The Curug Luhur falls are 50 metres high and easily accessible.

== See also ==
- Paspampres Resident
