= Tenjolaya =

- District
- Location in Bogor Regency, Java and Indonesia Tenjolaya (Java) Tenjolaya (Indonesia)
- Coordinates: 6°39′06″S 106°42′19″E
- Country: Indonesia
- Province: West Java
- Regency: Bogor Regency

Area
  - Total: 22.64 km^{2} (8.74 sq mi)

Population (mid 2024 estimate)
  - Total: 70,915
  - Density: 3,132/km^{2} (8,113/sq mi)
- Time zone: UTC+7 (IWST)
- Area code: (+62) 251
- Vehicle registration: F
- Villages: 7
- Website: kecamatantenjolaya.bogorkab.go.id

Tenjolaya is an administrative district (Indonesian: kecamatan) in the Bogor Regency of West Java Province, Indonesia and thus part of Jakarta's metropolitan area.

Tenjolaya District covers an area of 22.64 km^{2}, and had a population of 54,887 at the 2010 Census and 63,645 at the 2020 Census; the official estimate as at mid 2024 was 70,915 (comprising 36,536 males and 34,379 females). The administrative centre is at the town of Tapos I, and the district is sub-divided into seven villages (desa), all sharing the postcode of 16371, as listed below with their areas and populations as at mid 2024.

Kode Wilayah	Name of desa	Area in km^{2}	Population mid 2024 estimate
32.01.40.2001	Tapos I	4.81	10,809
32.01.40.2006	Gunung Malang	3.45	8,261
32.01.40.2002	Tapos II	2.27	8,984
32.01.40.2004	Situ Daun	3.29	10,943
32.01.40.2003	Cibitung Tengah	3.09	12,800
32.01.40.2005	Cinangneng	2.57	10,886
32.01.40.2007	Gunung Mulya	3.16	8,232
32.01.40	Totals	22.64	70,915
