= Parung =

- Town and District
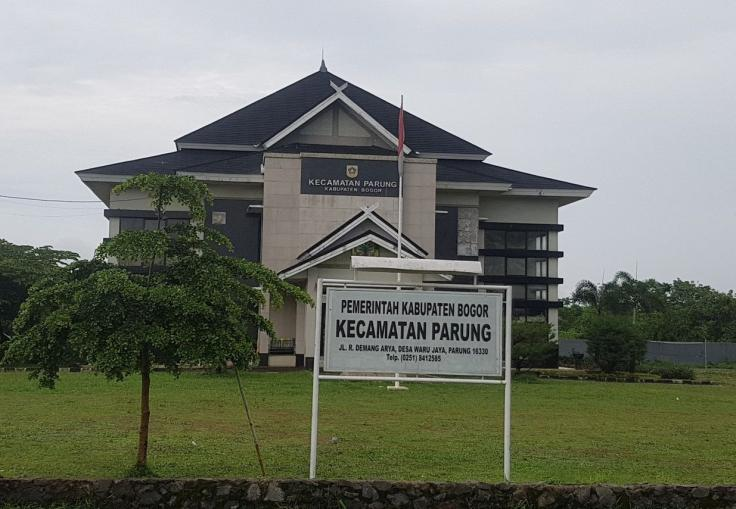

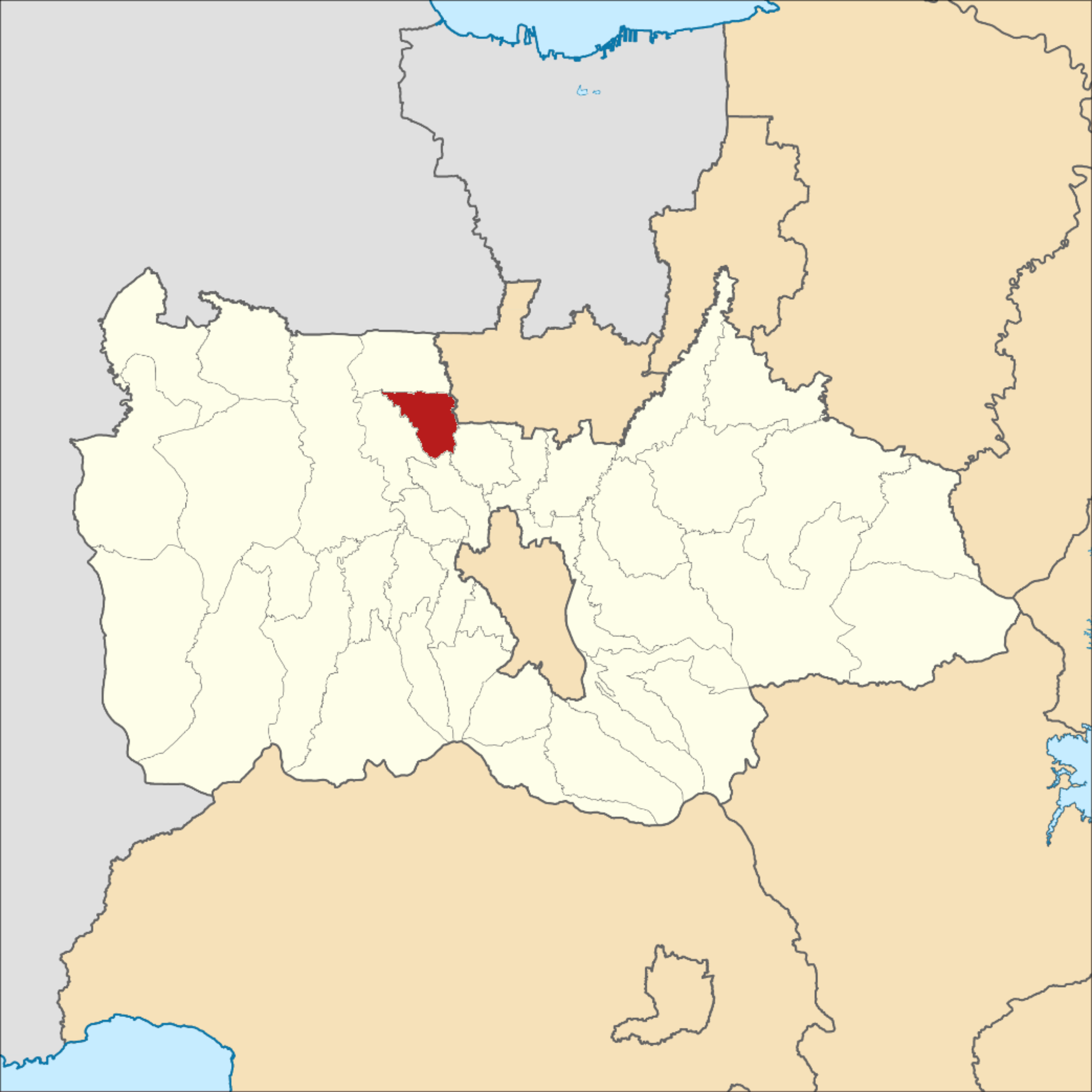

- Location in Bogor Regency, Java and Indonesia Parung (Java) Parung (Indonesia)
- Coordinates: 6.422284°S 106.732659°E
- Country: Indonesia
- Region: Java
- Province: West Java
- Regency: Bogor Regency

Government
  - Camat: Yudi Santosa

Area
  - Total: 25.86 km^{2} (9.98 sq mi)
- Elevation: 96 m (315 ft)

Population (mid 2023 estimate)
  - Total: 128,905
  - Density: 4,985/km^{2} (12,910/sq mi)
- Time zone: UTC+7 (IWST)
- Postcodes: 161xx, 163xx
- Area code: (+62) 21/251
- Vehicle registration: F
- Villages: 9
- Website: kecamatanparung.bogorkab.go.id

Parung (Sundanese:ᮕᮛᮥᮀ) is a town and administrative district (kecamatan) in Indonesia located near the southwestern suburb of South Jakarta, but officially still within the area of the Bogor Regency. Parung District covers 25.86 km^{2}, and had a population of 112,529 at the 2010 Census and 123,078 at the 2020 Census. The official estimate as at mid-2023 was 128,905, comprising 65,568 males and 63,337 females. Those who travel from Jakarta to Bogor through the western alternative road have to pass through Parung.

Parung has a traditional market, Pasar Parung, as its commercial centre. It is situated on both sides of the main road, which causes daily traffic congestion. Pasar Parung features a very large tree called Pohon Jubleg by locals, according to whom Jubleg means 'idle' and 'not going anywhere'. Locals often attributed mystical elements to the tree because of its old age.

== Administrative divisions ==
The administrative centre of the district is at the town of Warujaya, and the district is sub-divided into nine villages (desa), all sharing the postcode of 16330, as listed below with their areas and populations as at mid 2023.

Kode Wilayah	Name of desa	Area in km^{2}	Population mid 2023 estimate
32.01.10.2001	Parung (town)	1.69	16,329
32.01.10.2002	Iwul	4.00	8,639
32.01.10.2003	Bojong Sempu	1.59	10,520
32.01.10.2004	Waru	3.67	20,414
32.01.10.2005	Cogreg	5.23	18,925
32.01.10.2006	Pamager Sari	3.11	16,414
32.01.10.2007	Warujaya	2.93	16,572
32.01.10.2008	Bojong Indah	1.47	11,123
32.01.10.2009	Jabon Mekar	2.17	9,969
32.01.10	Totals	25.86	128,905

== Economy ==
Parung is famous locally for producing durian called durian parung. It is however becomes particularly rare to find such durian in Parung itself.

Parung is also famous for its fish cultivation, particularly ornamental fish. Pasar Parung, which serve as Parung's commercial center, is widely acknowledged as the biggest ornamental fish market in Indonesia, and maybe even in Southeast Asia.

== Cultures ==
Parung District is close to the border with the cities of South Tangerang and Depok which are the centres of Betawi culture, so that there is a mix of Betawi culture with local Sundanese culture in the Parung area.

The mixing of cultures in the Parung District causes the typical arts of the district to also vary. There are religious arts such as marawis, tambourines, then kelaran parade arts and cucurak which have existed in Parung District since ancient times and are still inherent in Parung.

The Sundanese language is also still used by the community in several villages in the Parung District which borders Ciseeng district and Kemang district, but some still use Betawi language in the area bordering Depok and South Tangerang. The language used in Parung is also a mixture of cultures between the nine villages in Parung District.
