= Cariu =

- Town and District
- Location in Bogor Regency, Java and Indonesia Cariu (Java) Cariu (Indonesia)
- Coordinates: 6.526090°S 107.134933°E
- Country: Indonesia
- Province: West Java
- Regency: Bogor Regency
- Established: 15 March 1984

Area
  - Total: 73.66 km^{2} (28.44 sq mi)
- Elevation: 167 m (548 ft)
- Highest elevation: 700 m (2,300 ft)
- Lowest elevation: 81 m (266 ft)

Population (mid 2025 estimate)
  - Total: 56,461
  - Density: 766.5/km^{2} (1,985/sq mi)
- Time zone: UTC+7 (IWST)
- Area code: (+62) 251
- Vehicle registration: F
- Villages: 10

Cariu is a town and an administrative district (Indonesian: kecamatan) in the Bogor Regency, West Java, Indonesia. The district is part of the Greater Jakarta metropolitan area, and covers a land area of 73.66 km^{2}. It had a population of 46,186 at the 2010 Census and 51,619 at the 2020 Census; the official estimate as at mid 2025 was 56,461 (comprising 28,249 males and 28,212 females).

Cariu District was previously part of Jonggol District before it was split off from the eastern part of that district on 15 March 1984.

The district centre is at the town of Cariu, and the district is sub-divided into ten villages (desa), all sharing the postcode of 16840, as listed below with their areas and populations as at mid 2024.

Kode Wilayah	Name of kelurahan or desa	Area in km^{2}	Population mid 2025 estimate
32.01.08.2001	Karya Mekar	8.08	4,181
32.01.08.2007	Bantar Kuning	10.15	5,519
32.01.08.2003	Cikutamahi	13.83	4,795
32.01.08.2010	Cibatu Tiga	9.98	4,721
32.01.08.2006	Mekarwangi	4.48	6,206
32.01.08.2009	Tegal Panjang	4.41	5,978
32.01.08.2005	Cariu (town)	5.12	11,529
32.01.08.2004	Kutamekar	6.66	3,970
32.01.08.2008	Sukajadi	4.27	3,349
32.01.08.2002	Babakan Raden	6.68	6,213
32.01.08	Totals	73.66	56,461
