= Cibinong =

Cibinong ᮎᮤᮘᮤᮔᮧᮀ
- Town and District
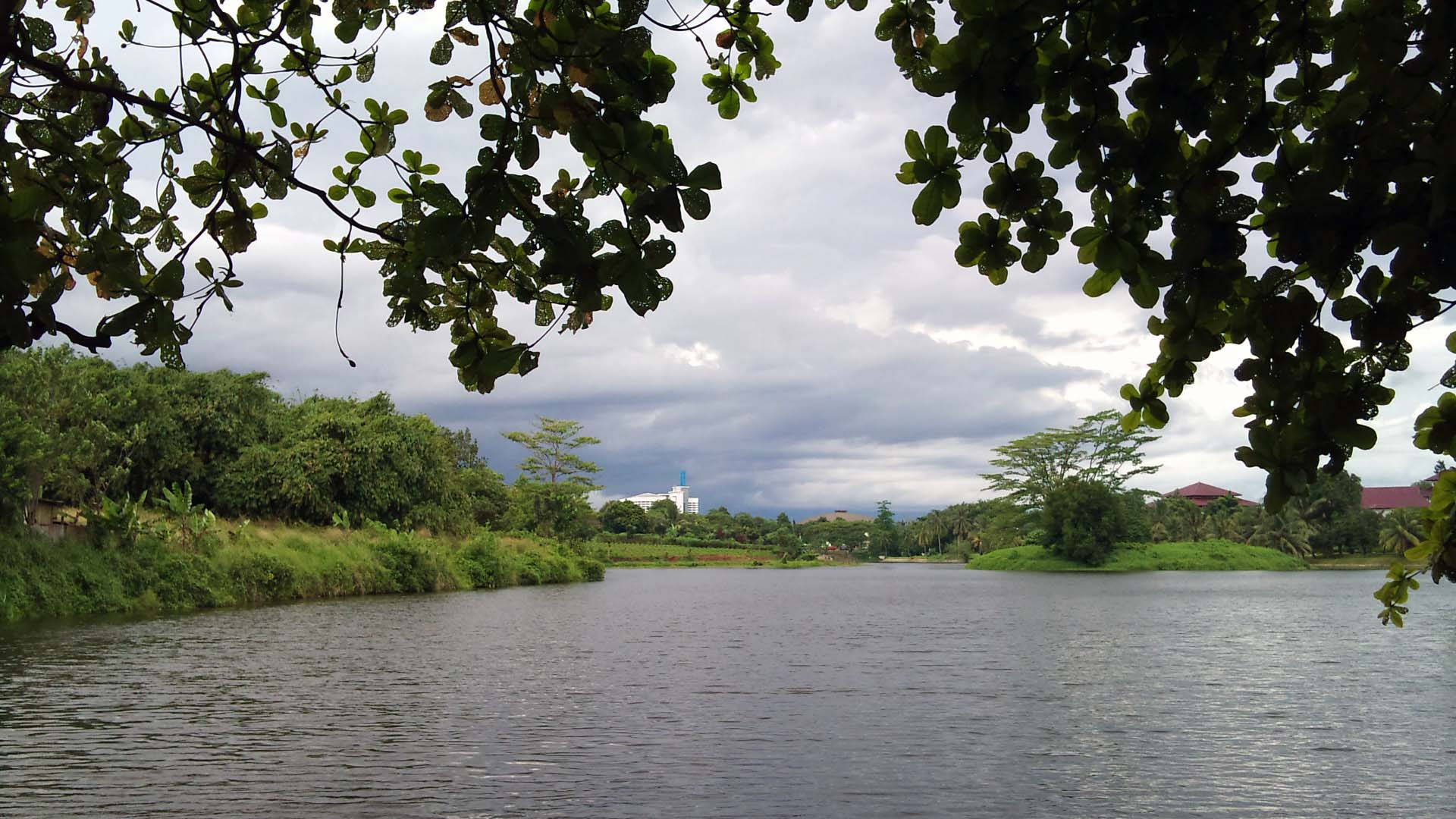
- Lake of Setu Cibinong

- Location in Bogor Regency, Java and Indonesia Cibinong (Java) Cibinong (Indonesia)
- Coordinates: 6°29′06″S 106°50′31″E
- Country: Indonesia
- Province: West Java
- Regency: Bogor Regency

Government
  - Camat: Bambang Widodo Tawekal
  - Secretary: Andri Rahman

Area
  - Total: 44.27 km^{2} (17.09 sq mi)
- Elevation: 130 m (430 ft)

Population (mid 2024 estimate)
  - Total: 379,786
  - Density: 8,579/km^{2} (22,220/sq mi)
- Time zone: UTC+7 (IWST)
- Area code: (+62) 251
- Vehicle registration: F
- Villages: 13
- Website: Official website

Cibinong (Sundanese: ᮎᮤᮘᮤᮔᮧᮀ) is a large town and an administrative district (kecamatan) in Bogor Regency, West Java Province, Indonesia which serves as the Regency's administrative seat - not to be confused with the district of the same name in Cianjur Regency. The town is located immediately due south of the city of Depok, which itself lies just south of Jakarta, with both Depok and Cibinong being part of the Jakarta Metropolitan Area. The town and district are named after the Binong River (the prefix "ci" means "river"). Cibinong District covers a land area of 44.27 km^{2}, and had 326,519 inhabitants at the 2010 Census and 363,424 inhabitants at the 2020 Census; the official estimate as at mid 2024 was 379,786 (comprising 190,790 males and 188,996 females}. The administrative headquarters are in the town of Cirimekar.

The Science Center of the Indonesian Institute of Sciences (Lembaga Ilmu Pengetahuan Indonesia) is located in the district. Cibinong contains a swamp forest, which was already mentioned by van Steenis in 1933, called Rawa (Swamp) Siradayah, and it is still preserved until the present time.

== Food and culture ==
Cuisine specialities of Cibinong include laksa cibinong and Mie ayam (Chicken noodles) due to the strong influence of Chinese community. Laksa is a spicy noodle soup from the Peranakan culture. Laksa Cibinong is a kind of thick yellowish coconut milk based soup, produced by a mixture of some spices, and it is served with bean sprout, rice vermicelli (bihun), hard-boiled eggs, cooked shredded chicken, fried shallots and Indonesian lemon-basil leaves. Sometime they are also served with rice cake (lontong). Mie ayam is easily found everywhere, as a cheap food for factory workers and school students. There are basically two preparation styles, one is more Indonesian in style (with Indonesian spices, sweet soy sauce, saos sambel), and the other one is more Chinese (using for example star anise, sesame oil or soy sauce). Most of the places offers, in addition to noddle, kwetiau or bihun.

Chinese Peranakan culture can be seen at the Chinese Temple Ho Tek Bio near Cibinong market, during Imlek or Chinese New Year. Near the market, in front of the lake, there is a Chinese cemetery compound (Sentiong).

== Administrative divisions ==
Cibinong District is divided into thirteen administrative urban communities (kelurahan), listed below with their areas and their populations as at mid 2024, together with their postcodes.

Kode Wilayah	Name of kelurahan	Area in km^{2}	Population mid 2024 estimate	Post code
32.01.01.1002	Karadenan	4.04	37,516	16913
32.01.01.1004	Nanggewer	3.91	36,8813	16912
32.01.01.1005	Nanggewer Mekar	2.53	16,727	16912
32.01.01.1006	Cibinong (town)	4.71	29,121	16911
32.01.01.1007	Pakansari	5.02	37,839	16915
32.01.01.1008	Tengah	3.26	31,945	16914
32.01.01.1009	Sukahati	4.69	16,338	16913
32.01.01.1001	Pondok Rajeg	2.76	18,982	16914
32.01.01.1003	Harapan Jaya	2.8	30,224	16914
32.01.01.1012	Pabuaran	3.18	51,569	16916
32.01.01.1011	Cirimekar	1.72	13,967	16917
32.01.01.1010	Ciriung	3.72	32,908	16918
32.01.01.1013	Pabuaran Mekar	1.92	25,769	16916
32.01.01	Totals	44.27	379,786	

== Climate ==
Cibinong has a tropical rainforest climate (Af) with heavy to very heavy rainfall year-round.

Climate data for Cibinong
Month	Jan	Feb	Mar	Apr	May	Jun	Jul	Aug	Sep	Oct	Nov	Dec	Year
Mean daily maximum °C (°F)	29.1 (84.4)	29.4 (84.9)	30.2 (86.4)	31.0 (87.8)	31.2 (88.2)	31.2 (88.2)	31.3 (88.3)	31.8 (89.2)	32.1 (89.8)	32.0 (89.6)	31.3 (88.3)	30.5 (86.9)	30.9 (87.7)
Daily mean °C (°F)	25.6 (78.1)	25.7 (78.3)	26.0 (78.8)	26.6 (79.9)	26.6 (79.9)	26.2 (79.2)	26.1 (79.0)	26.3 (79.3)	26.6 (79.9)	26.8 (80.2)	26.7 (80.1)	26.4 (79.5)	26.3 (79.4)
Mean daily minimum °C (°F)	22.1 (71.8)	22.0 (71.6)	21.9 (71.4)	22.2 (72.0)	22.1 (71.8)	21.3 (70.3)	20.9 (69.6)	20.8 (69.4)	21.1 (70.0)	21.7 (71.1)	22.1 (71.8)	22.3 (72.1)	21.7 (71.1)
Average rainfall mm (inches)	371 (14.6)	330 (13.0)	334 (13.1)	371 (14.6)	305 (12.0)	192 (7.6)	170 (6.7)	193 (7.6)	210 (8.3)	298 (11.7)	313 (12.3)	353 (13.9)	3,440 (135.4)
Source: Climate-Data.org

== See also ==
- Bekasi river
