= Parung Panjang =

- Town and District
- Location in Bogor Regency, Java and Indonesia Parung Panjang (Java) Parung Panjang (Indonesia)
- Coordinates: 6°22′00″S 106°33′20″E
- Country: Indonesia
- Province: West Java
- Regency: Bogor Regency

Area
  - Total: 64.65 km^{2} (24.96 sq mi)
- Elevation: 63 m (207 ft)

Population (mid 2024 estimate)
  - Total: 133,013
  - Density: 2,057/km^{2} (5,329/sq mi)
- Time zone: UTC+7 (IWST)
- Area code: (+62) 251
- Vehicle registration: F
- Villages: 11
- Website: kecamatanparungpanjang.bogorkab.go.id

Parung Panjang is a town (classed as desa) and an administrative district (Indonesian: kecamatan) in the Bogor Regency of West Java Province, Indonesia (Parung Panjang District is not to be confused with Parung District in the same regency), and is thus part of Jakarta's metropolitan area.

Parung Panjang District covers an area of 64.65 km^{2}, and had a population of 110,004 at the 2010 Census and 118,176 at the 2020 Census; the official estimate as at mid 2024 was 133,013 (comprising 68,467 males and 64,546 females). The administrative centre is at the town of Parung Panjang, and the district is sub-divided into eleven villages (desa), all sharing the postcode of 16360, as listed below with their areas and populations as at mid 2024.

Kode Wilayah	Name of desa	Area in km^{2}	Population mid 2024 estimate
32.01.20.2001	Jagabaya	9.81	9,120
32.01.20.2002	Gorowong	10.07	10,688
32.01.20.2003	Dago	6.71	7,559
32.01.20.2005	Cikuda	4.94	10,188
32.01.20.2004	Pingku	6.45	9,644
32.01.20.2007	Lumpang	6.81	17,067
32.01.20.2010	Gintung Cilejet	7.02	9,911
32.01.20.2009	Jagabita	3.11	8,440
32.01.20.2008	Cibunar	3.78	15,201
32.01.20.2006	Parung Panjang (town)	2.43	19,912
32.01.20.2011	Kabasiran	3.52	15,283
32.01.20	Totals	64.65	133,013
