= Caringin =

- Town and District
- Location in Bogor Regency, Java and Indonesia Caringin (Java) Caringin (Indonesia)
- Coordinates: 6°42′14″S 106°49′30″E
- Country: Indonesia
- Province: West Java
- Regency: Bogor Regency

Area
  - Total: 45.44 km^{2} (17.54 sq mi)
- Elevation: 455 m (1,493 ft)

Population (mid 2024 estimate)
  - Total: 144,219
  - Density: 3,174/km^{2} (8,220/sq mi)
- Time zone: UTC+7 (IWST)
- Area code: (+62) 251
- Vehicle registration: F
- Villages: 12
- Website: kecamatancaringin.bogorkab.go.id

Caringin is a town and an administrative district (Indonesian: kecamatan) in the Bogor Regency, West Java, Indonesia - not to be confused with the district of the same name in Sukabumi Regency - and thus part of Jakarta's larger conurbation; the district is often considered as one of Jakarta's outermost suburbs, although the closest city in the region to Caringin is Bogor city, as it lies just a few kilometres south of that city.

Caringin District covers an area of 45.44 km^{2}, and had a population of 114,229 at the 2010 Census and 131,012 at the 2020 Census; the official estimate as at mid 2024 was 144,219 (comprising 74,570 males and 69,649 females). The administrative centre is at the town of Cimande Hilir ("Upper Cimande"), and the district is sub-divided into twelve villages (desa), all sharing the postcode of 16730, as listed below with their areas and populations as at mid 2024.

Kode Wilayah	Name of desa	Area in km^{2}	Population mid 2024 estimate
32.01.27.2010	Pasir Buncir	6.05	8,360
32.01.27.2006	Cinagara	4.96	11,784
32.01.27.2012	Tangkil	6.44	11,525
32.01.27.2001	Pasir Muncang	1.91	9,928
32.01.27.2009	Muara Jaya	1.27	6,820
32.01.27.2004	Caringin (town)	1.48	11,959
32.01.27.2011	Lemah Duhur	4.58	15,695
32.01.27.2007	Cimande	3.35	7,697
32.01.27.2008	Pancawati	6.26	17,425
32.01.27.2003	Ciderum	3.22	17,497
32.01.27.2005	Ciherang Pondok	4.07	15,633
32.01.27.2002	Cimande Hilir	1.85	9,896
32.01.27	Totals	45.44	144,219
