= Sukamakmur =

- Town and District
- Nickname: Bhutan Van Java (The nickname includes Jonggol)
- Location in Bogor Regency, Java and Indonesia Sukamakmur (Java) Sukamakmur (Indonesia)
- Coordinates: 6.552038°S 107.056940°E
- Country: Indonesia
- Province: West Java
- Regency: Bogor Regency
- Established: 26 May 1999

Area
  - Total: 175 km^{2} (68 sq mi)
- Elevation: 577 m (1,893 ft)
- Highest elevation: 1,890 m (6,200 ft)
- Lowest elevation: 340 m (1,120 ft)

Population (mid 2025 estimate)
  - Total: 98,244
  - Density: 561/km^{2} (1,450/sq mi)
- Time zone: UTC+7 (IWST)
- Area code: (+62) 251
- Vehicle registration: F
- Villages: 10

Sukamakmur is a town and an administrative district (Indonesian: kecamatan) in the Bogor Regency, West Java, Indonesia. The district is part of the Greater Jakarta metropolitan area, and covers a land area of about 175 km^{2}. It had a population of 74,578 at the 2010 Census and 85,565 at the 2020 Census; the official estimate as at mid 2025 was 98,244 (comprising 51,042 males and 47,202 females). The Sukamakmur District area is currently included in the Jonggol Tourism Area or known as "Puncak Dua", a vast alternative tourism area in Greater Jakarta.

Sukamakmur District was previously part of Jonggol District before it was split off from the southern part of that district on 26 May 1999. At the time of the discussion about moving the capital of Indonesia to Jonggol, Sukamakmur was also included in the area that would have become the capital of Indonesia instead of Jakarta.

The district centre is at the town of Sukamakmur, and the district is sub-divided into ten villages (desa), all sharing the postcode of 16831, as listed below with their areas and populations as at mid 2025.

Kode Wilayah	Name of kelurahan or desa	Area in km^{2}	Population mid 2025 estimate
32.01.09.2004	Sukawangi	19	12,338
32.01.09.2008	Sukaharja	37	8,948
32.01.09.2001	Wargajaya	16	9,068
32.01.09.2009	Sirnajaya	15	9,648
32.01.09.2007	Sukamulya	16	9,275
32.01.09.2010	Sukamakmur (town)	16	8,598
32.01.09.2005	Cibadak	10	10,400
32.01.09.2002	Pabuaran	19	15,375
32.01.09.2003	Sukadamai	17	6,875
32.01.09.2006	Sukaresmi	10	7,719
32.01.09	Totals	175	98,244
