= Tajurhalang =

- Town and District
- Location in Bogor Regency, Java and Indonesia Tajurhalang (Java) Tajurhalang (Indonesia)
- Country: Indonesia
- Province: West Java
- Regency: Bogor Regency
- Established: 15 June 2001 (regional expansion from Bojonggede)

Area
  - Total: 29.91 km^{2} (11.55 sq mi)
- Elevation: 125 m (410 ft)

Population (mid 2024 estimate)
  - Total: 136,752
  - Density: 4,572/km^{2} (11,840/sq mi)
- Time zone: UTC+7 (IWST)
- Area code: (+62) 251
- Vehicle registration: F
- Villages: 7

Tajurhalang is a town and an administrative district (Indonesian: kecamatan) in the Bogor Regency, West Java, Indonesia. The district is part of the Greater Jakarta metropolitan area, and covers a land area of 29.91 km^{2}. It had a population of 97,255 at the 2010 Census and 123,454 at the 2020 Census; the official estimate as at mid 2024 was 136,752 (comprising 69,158 males and 67,594 females.

== Administrative divisions ==
The district centre is at the town of Tajurhalang, and the district is sub-divided into seven villages (desa), all sharing the postcode of 16320, as listed below with their areas and populations as at mid 2024.

Kode Wilayah	Name of kelurahan or desa	Area in km^{2}	Population mid 2024 estimate
32.01.37.2006	Tonjong	3.96	12,702
32.01.37.2001	Tajurhalang (town)	6.12	25,473
32.01.37.2005	Sukmajaya	2.84	12,207
32.01.37.2004	Nanggerang	2.43	13,247
32.01.37.2003	Sasakpanjang	5.66	33,939
32.01.37.2007	Kalisuren	5.30	24,287
32.01.37.2002	Citayam	3.59	14,897
32.01.37	Totals	29.91	136,752
