= Paspampres Resident =

- Motto: Setia Waspada (Indonesian language)
- Location within Bogor Regency
- Coordinates: 6°25′59.01″S 107°1′47.78″E
- Country: Indonesia
- Province: West Java
- Regency: Bogor

Area
  - Total: 34 km^{2} (13 sq mi)

Population (2010)
  - Total: 26,591
  - Density: 780/km^{2} (2,000/sq mi)
- Time zone: UTC+7 (Indonesia Western Standard Time)

Paspampres Resident or Perumahan Paspampres is the Housing in the Bogor Regency of West Java, Indonesia. Perumahan (Resident) Paspampres had 26,591 inhabitants at the 2010 Census.
