= Tamansari, Bandung =

Area in Bandung, Indonesia

Coordinates: 6°54′07″S 107°36′26″E

Tamansari is an area in Bandung, Indonesia. It includes the Bandung Zoo, Babakan Siliwangi, and Bandung Institute of Technology.
