= Ciampea =

- Town and District
- Location in Bogor Regency, Java and Indonesia Ciampea (Java) Ciampea (Indonesia)
- Coordinates: 6°36′46″S 106°40′56″E
- Country: Indonesia
- Province: West Java
- Regency: Bogor Regency

Area
  - Total: 30.62 km^{2} (11.82 sq mi)
- Elevation: 188 m (617 ft)

Population (mid 2024 estimate)
  - Total: 181,305
  - Density: 5,921/km^{2} (15,340/sq mi)
- Time zone: UTC+7 (IWST)
- Area code: (+62) 251
- Vehicle registration: F
- Villages: 13
- Website: kecamatanciampea.bogorkab.go.id

Ciampea is a town and an administrative district (Indonesian: kecamatan) in the Bogor Regency, West Java, Indonesia and thus part of Jakarta's metropolitan area.

Ciampea District covers an area of 30.62 km^{2}, and had a population of 147,130 at the 2010 Census and 168,359 at the 2020 Census; the official estimate as at mid 2024 was 181,305 (comprising 93,142 males and 88,163 females). The administrative centre is at the town of Bojong Rangkas, and the district is sub-divided into thirteen villages (desa), all sharing the postcode of 16620, as listed below with their areas and populations as at mid 2024.

Kode Wilayah	Name of desa	Area in km^{2}	Population mid 2024 estimate
32.01.15.2013	Ciampea Udik	2.62	8,827
32.01.15.2002	Cinangka	3.40	15,945
32.01.15.2006	Cibuntu	2.54	9,667
32.01.15.2007	Cicadas	3.20	14,843
32.01.15.2005	Tegal Waru	3.38	15,796
32.01.15.2004	Bojong Jengkol	2.12	11,929
32.01.15.2003	Cihideung Udik	2.84	18,336
32.01.15.2010	Cihideung Ilir	1.78	11,994
32.01.15.2011	Cibanteng	1.62	19,252
32.01.15.2009	Bojong Rangkas	1.04	14,388
32.01.15.2008	Cibadak	1.14	12,533
32.01.15.2012	Benteng	2.48	13,221
32.01.15.2001	Ciampea (town)	2.46	14,281
32.01.15	Totals	30.62	181,305
