= Jakarta Bay =

- Teluk Jakarta (Indonesian)
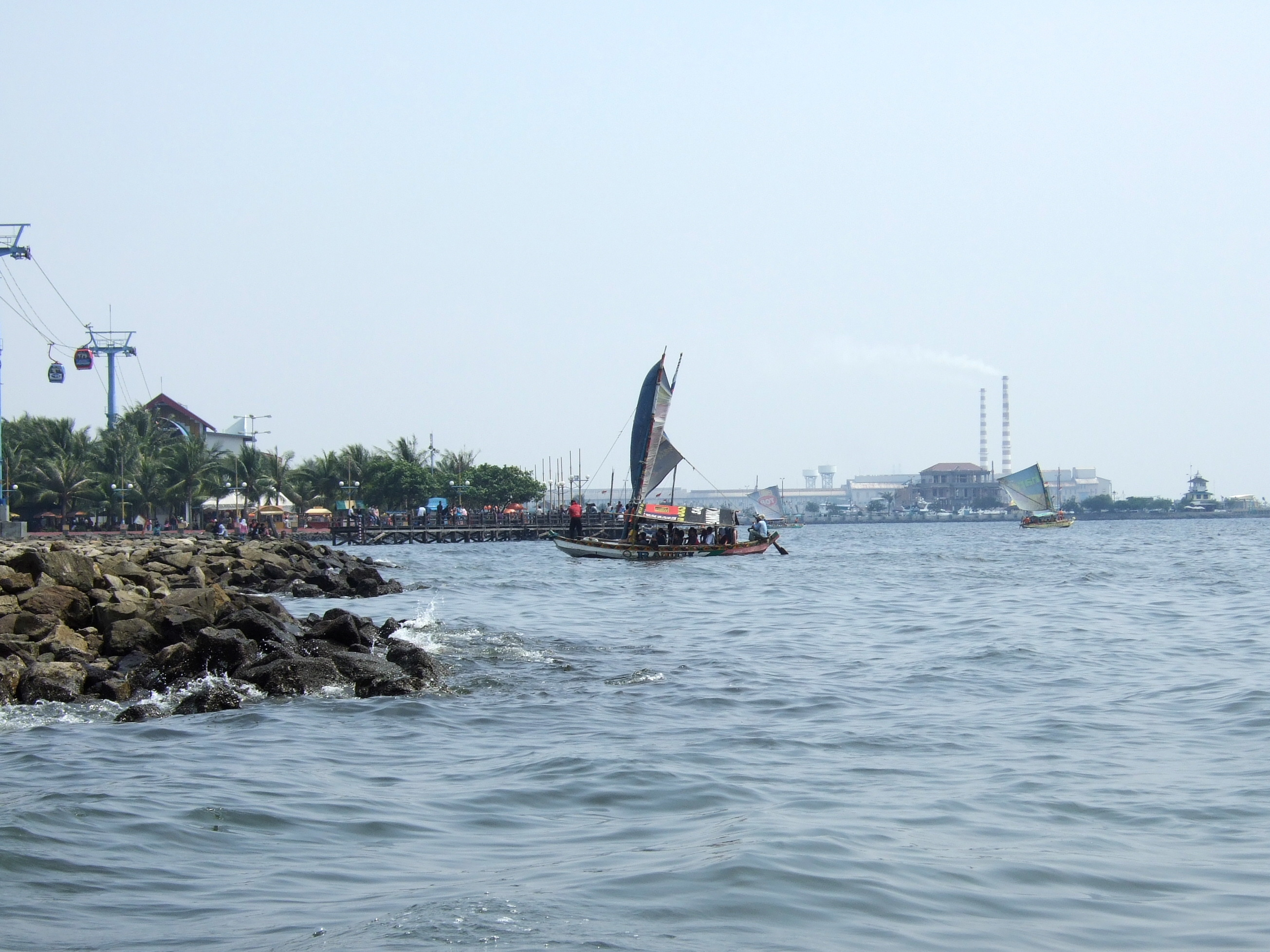
- Jakarta Bay seen from Ancol

- Location within Java
- Location: Southeast Asia
- Coordinates: 6°00′00″S 106°51′32.40″E
- Type: Bay
- Basin countries: Indonesia
- References: Jakarta Bay

Jakarta Bay (Indonesian: Teluk Jakarta) is a bay north of North Jakarta city. The Thousand Islands are located in Jakarta Bay. 13 rivers flow into the bay. The majority of the bay's coastal communities consist of people living below the poverty line, in conditions of poor sanitation. Nutrient inputs from agricultural runoff, industrial pollution, and wastewater have led to eutrophication, which in turn led to changes in the area's biodiversity. Harmful algal blooms have been observed.

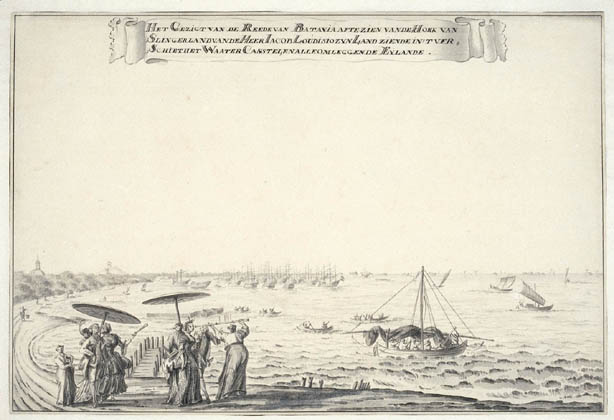
Bay of Batavia in the 18th century

It was known as Bay of Batavia by the Dutch, who founded their city of Batavia, an administrative capital of the Dutch East Indies Company, in 1619.

There are several rivers that flow into Jakarta Bay, including (in order from east to west): Kali Bekasi, Kali Cakung, Kali Buaran, Kali Sunter, Ciliwung, Kali Krukut, Kali Angke.
