= Jasinga =

- Town and District
- Location in Bogor Regency, Java and Indonesia Jasinga (Java) Jasinga (Indonesia)
- Coordinates: 6°28′51″S 106°27′51″E
- Country: Indonesia
- Province: West Java
- Regency: Bogor Regency

Area
  - Total: 122.95 km^{2} (47.47 sq mi)
- Elevation: 107 m (351 ft)

Population (mid 2024 estimate)
  - Total: 116,144
  - Density: 944.64/km^{2} (2,446.6/sq mi)
- Time zone: UTC+7 (IWST)
- Area code: (+62) 251
- Vehicle registration: F
- Villages: 16
- Website: kecamatanjasinga.bogorkab.go.id

Jasinga is a town and an administrative district (Indonesian: kecamatan) in the Bogor Regency of West Java Province, Indonesia and thus part of Jakarta's metropolitan area.

Jasinga District covers an area of 122.95 km^{2}, and had a population of 93,078 at the 2010 Census and 106,343 at the 2020 Census; the official estimate as at mid 2024 was 116,144 (comprising 60,313 males and 55,831 females). The administrative centre is at the town of Pamagersari, and the district is sub-divided into sixteen villages (desa), all sharing the postcode of 16670, as listed below with their areas and populations as at mid 2024.

Kode Wilayah	Name of desa	Area in km^{2}	Population mid 2024 estimate
32.01.19.2002	Pangradin	11.75	6,908
32.01.19.2003	Kalongsawah	11.74	12,696
32.01.19.2004	Sipak	5.58	13,230
32.01.19.2012	Pamagersari	3.15	5,492
32.01.19.2013	Jugalajaya	11.59	6,271
32.01.19.2001	Curug	12.60	6,321
32.01.19.2014	Tegalwangi	9.46	6,528
32.01.19.2006	Koleang	6.30	6,812
32.01.19.2005	Jasinga (town)	3.95	6,204
32.01.19.2008	Setu	3.17	5,908
32.01.19.2007	Cikopomayak	4.56	7,532
32.01.19.2015	Neglasari	4.70	3,444
32.01.19.2010	Bagoang	4.50	7,779
32.01.19.2009	Barengkok	5.51	10,315
32.01.19.2011	Pangaur	12.66	6,063
32.01.19.2016	Wirajaya	11.73	4,641
32.01.19	Totals	122.95	116,144
