= Tanjungsari, Bogor =

Tanjungsari
- Town and District
- Location in Bogor Regency, Java and Indonesia Tanjungsari (Java) Tanjungsari (Indonesia)
- Coordinates: 6.611054°S 107.138672°E
- Country: Indonesia
- Province: West Java
- Regency: Bogor Regency
- Established: 15 June 2001

Area
  - Total: 191.60 km^{2} (73.98 sq mi)
- Elevation: 310 m (1,020 ft)
- Highest elevation: 1,291 m (4,236 ft)
- Lowest elevation: 149 m (489 ft)

Population (mid 2025 estimate)
  - Total: 64,601
  - Density: 337.17/km^{2} (873.26/sq mi)
- Time zone: UTC+7 (IWST)
- Area code: (+62) 251
- Vehicle registration: F
- Villages: 10

Tanjungsari is a town and an administrative district (Indonesian: kecamatan) in the Bogor Regency, West Java, Indonesia, not to be confused with other districts of the same name in Sumedang Regency and in Gunungkidul Regency. The district is part of the Jabodetabek area, and covers a land area of 191.60 km^{2}. It had a population of 50,014 at the 2010 Census and 57,027 at the 2020 Census; the official estimate as at mid 2025 was 64,601 (comprising 32,758 males and 31,843 females). The district centre is at the town of Tanjungsari, and the district is sub-divided into ten villages (desa), all sharing the postcode of 16841, as listed below with their areas and populations as at mid 2025.

Kode Wilayah	Name of kelurahan or desa	Area in km^{2}	Population mid 2025 estimate
32.01.36.2006	Cibadak	13.26	7,640
32.01.36.2001	Tanjungsari (town)	7.60	9,168
32.01.36.2008	Sinarsari	8.55	6,983
32.01.36.2010	Sinarrasa	54.10	7,043
32.01.36.2009	Buanajaya	39.76	4,719
32.01.36.2004	Antajaya	16.56	6,459
32.01.36.2005	Pasir Tanjung	3.15	5,567
32.01.36.2003	Tanjung Rasa	8.27	4,049
32.01.36.2007	Sukarasa	15.16	6,142
32.01.36.2002	Selawangi	25.19	6,831
32.01.36	Totals	191.60	64,601
