= Tamansari, Bogor =

Tamansari
- Town and District
- Location in Bogor Regency, Java and Indonesia Tamansari (Java) Tamansari (Indonesia)
- Coordinates: 6°39′00″S 106°45′19″E
- Country: Indonesia
- Province: West Java
- Regency: Bogor Regency

Area
  - Total: 33.74 km^{2} (13.03 sq mi)

Population (mid 2024 estimate)
  - Total: 117,285
  - Density: 3,476/km^{2} (9,003/sq mi)
- Time zone: UTC+7 (IWST)
- Area code: (+62) 251
- Vehicle registration: F
- Villages: 8
- Website: kecamatantamansari.bogorkab.go.id

Tamansari is a town and an administrative district (Indonesian: kecamatan) in the Bogor Regency, West Java, Indonesia and thus part of Jakarta's larger conurbation. It is not to be confused with other districts of the same name in Boyolali Regency, West Jakarta City or Tasikmalaya City.

Tamansari District covers an area of 33.74 km^{2}, and had a population of 91,985 at the 2010 Census and 108,913 at the 2020 Census; the official estimate as at mid 2024 was 117,285 (comprising 60,159 males and 57,126 females). The administrative centre is at the town of Tamansari, and the district is sub-divided into eight villages (desa), all sharing the postcode of 16611, as listed below with their areas and populations as at mid 2024.

Kode Wilayah	Name of desa	Area in km^{2}	Population mid 2024 estimate
32.01.31.2008	Sukajadi	3.04	10,569
32.01.31.2005	Sukaluyu	3.01	11,296
32.01.31.2007	Sukajaya	4.27	11,894
32.01.31.2006	Sukaresmi	3.06	15,175
32.01.31.2003	Pasireurih	2.85	15,472
32.01.31.2004	Tamansari (town)	9.35	15,130
32.01.31.2001	Sukamantri	6.39	19,284
32.01.31.2002	Sirnagalih	1.77	18,465
32.01.31	Totals	33.74	117,285
