= Cibungbulang =

- District
- Location in Bogor Regency, Java and Indonesia Cibungbulang (Java) Cibungbulang (Indonesia)
- Coordinates: 6°34′32″S 106°39′37″E
- Country: Indonesia
- Province: West Java
- Regency: Bogor Regency

Area
  - Total: 32.42 km^{2} (12.52 sq mi)

Population (mid 2024 estimate)
  - Total: 158,653
  - Density: 4,894/km^{2} (12,670/sq mi)
- Time zone: UTC+7 (IWST)
- Area code: (+62) 251
- Vehicle registration: F
- Villages: 15
- Website: kecamatancibungbulang.bogorkab.go.id

Cibungbulang is an administrative district (Indonesian: kecamatan) in the Bogor Regency, West Java, Indonesia and thus part of Jakarta's metropolitan area.

Cibungbulang District covers an area of 32.42 km^{2}, and had a population of 125,177 at the 2010 Census and 145,706 at the 2020 Census; the official estimate as at mid 2024 was 158,653 (comprising 82,216 males and 76,437 females). The administrative centre is at the town of Cimanggu II, and the district is sub-divided into fifteen villages (desa), all sharing the postcode of 16630, as listed below with their areas and populations as at mid 2024.

Kode Wilayah	Name of desa	Area in km^{2}	Population mid 2024 estimate
32.01.16.2001	Situ Udik	3.70	16,702
32.01.16.2002	Situ Ilir	3.04	11,562
32.01.16.2012	Cibatok II	1.77	8,998
32.01.16.2005	Ciaruteun Udik	2.05	8,936
32.01.16.2004	Cibatok I	2.45	10,207
32.01.16.2013	Sukamaju	2.00	9,851
32.01.16.2003	Cemplang	2.24	11,105
32.01.16.2014	Galuga	1.71	7,094
32.01.16.2009	Dukuh	1.62	7,907
32.01.16.2008	Cimanggu II	1.23	10,036
32.01.16.2007	Cimanggu I	1.70	11,248
32.01.16.2015	Girimulya	1.22	10,740
32.01.16.2006	Leuweung Kolot	1.90	9,056
32.01.16.2011	Ciaruteun Ilir	3.60	14,008
32.01.16.2010	Cijujung	2.90	11,203
32.01.16	Totals	32.42	158,653
