= Kemang, Bogor =

Kemang
- Town and District
- Location in Bogor Regency, Java and Indonesia Kemang (Java) Kemang (Indonesia)
- Coordinates: 6°30′45″S 106°45′19″E
- Country: Indonesia
- Province: West Java
- Regency: Bogor Regency

Area
  - Total: 26.68 km^{2} (10.30 sq mi)
- Elevation: 175 m (574 ft)

Population (mid 2024 estimate)
  - Total: 115,206
  - Density: 4,318/km^{2} (11,180/sq mi)
- Time zone: UTC+7 (IWST)
- Area code: (+62) 251
- Vehicle registration: F
- Villages: 8
- Website: kecamatankemang.bogorkab.go.id

Kemang is a town and an administrative district (Indonesian: kecamatan) in the Bogor Regency, West Java, Indonesia and thus part of Jakarta's larger conurbation. It is not to be confused with other districts of the same name in Boyolali Regency, West Jakarta City or Tasikmalaya City.

Kemang District covers an area of 26.68 km^{2}, and had a population of 92,401 at the 2010 Census and 104,872 at the 2020 Census; the official estimate as at mid 2024 was 115,206 (comprising 58,424 males and 56,782 females). The administrative centre is at the town of Kemang, and the district is sub-divided into the town (kelurahan) of Atang Senjaya and eight villages (desa), all sharing the postcode of 16310, as listed below with their areas and populations as at mid 2024.

Kode Wilayah	Name of desa	Area in km^{2}	Population mid 2024 estimate
32.01.12.2005	Semplak Barat	0.88	8,764
32.01.12.1006	Atang Senjaya	2.00	3,578
32.01.12.2002	Parakan Jaya	2.19	11,470
32.01.12.2001	Bojong	2.87	15,656
32.01.12.2003	Kemang (town)	2.70	15,144
32.01.12.2004	Pabuaran	3.78	14,695
32.01.12.2009	Tegal	6.16	22,733
32.01.12.2008	Pondok Udik	3.23	9,889
32.01.12.2007	Jampang	2.87	13,277
32.01.12	Totals	26.68	115,206
