= Babakan Siliwangi =

Urban forest in Bandung. Indonesia

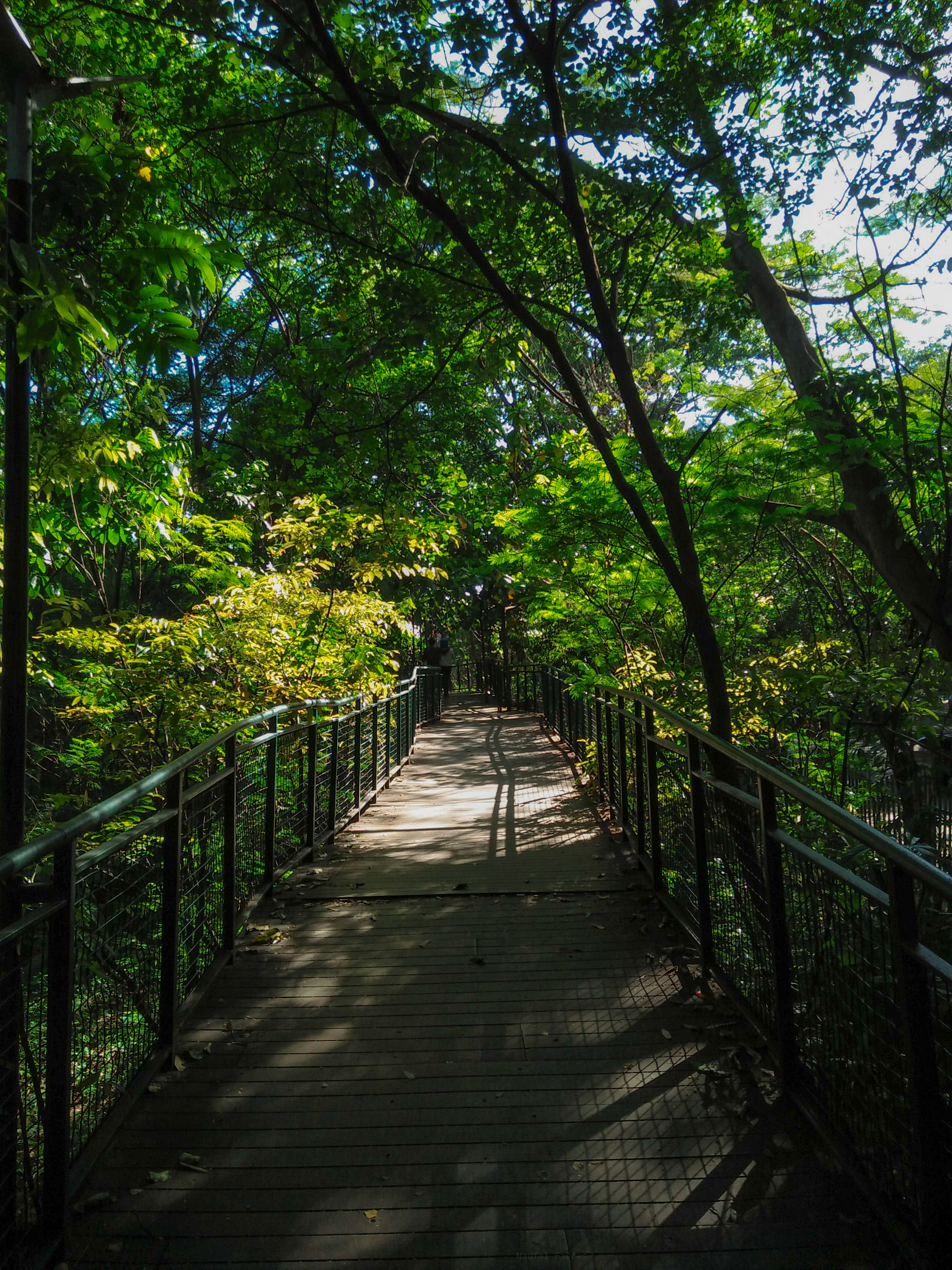
Forest Walk Babakan Siliwangi

Babakan Siliwangi (also abbreviated as Baksil) is a 3.8-hectare urban forest in Bandung, Indonesia It is part of the green belt of Bandung and is a place of recreation for local residents and features a canopied walking path. On 27 September 2011, the United Nations Environment Programme declared Babakan Siliwangi a protected World City Forest.
