= Sukaraja, Bogor =

Sukaraja
- Town and District
- Location in Bogor Regency, Java and Indonesia Sukaraja (Java) Sukaraja (Indonesia)
- Country: Indonesia
- Province: West Java
- Regency: Bogor Regency
- Established: 26 May 1999

Government
  - Camat: Azzhahir

Area
  - Total: 41.43 km^{2} (16.00 sq mi)
- Elevation: 220 m (720 ft)
- Highest elevation: 1,515 m (4,970 ft)
- Lowest elevation: 168 m (551 ft)

Population (mid 2024 estimate)
  - Total: 209,811
  - Density: 5,064/km^{2} (13,120/sq mi)
- Time zone: UTC+7 (IWST)
- Area code: (+62) 251
- Vehicle registration: F
- Villages: 13
- Website: kecamatansukaraja.bogorkab.go.id

Sukaraja is a town and an administrative district (Indonesian: kecamatan) in the Bogor Regency, West Java, Indonesia (not to be confused with other districts of the same name in Sukabumi Regency, Tasikmalaya Regency and Seluma Regency). Part of Jakarta's larger conurbation, the district lies immediately to the north and the east of Bogor city, of which it is effectively suburban.

Sukaraja District covers an area of 41.43 km^{2}, and had a population of 173,245 at the 2010 Census and 206,323 at the 2020 Census; the official estimate as of mid-2024 was 209,811 (comprising 107,045 males and 102,766 females). The administrative centre is at the town of Cimandala, and the district is subdivided into thirteen villages (desa), all sharing the postcode of 16711, as listed below with their areas and populations as of mid 2024.

Kode Wilayah	Name of kelurahan or desa	Area in km^{2}	Population mid 2024 estimate
32.01.04.2004	Cibanon	2.99	5,625
32.01.04.2001	Gunung Geulis	4.65	8,490
32.01.04.2005	Nagrak	6.56	14,701
32.01.04.2006	Sukatani	1.54	5,455
32.01.04.2007	Sukaraja (town)	2.22	10,483
32.01.04.2008	Cikeas	3.13	12,978
32.01.04.2012	Cadas Ngampar	1.82	8,574
32.01.04.2013	Pasirlaja	3.36	14,139
32.01.04.2011	Cijujung	4.11	28,913
32.01.04.2010	Cimandala	3.16	25,976
32.01.04.2009	Pasir Jambu	2.19	17,444
32.01.04.2002	Cilebut Timur	1.30	20,380
32.01.04.2003	Cilebut Barat	4.40	36,653
32.01.04	Totals	41.43	209,811
