= Kali Bekasi =

River in West Java, Indonesia

Coordinates: 6°07′36″S 107°03′35″E

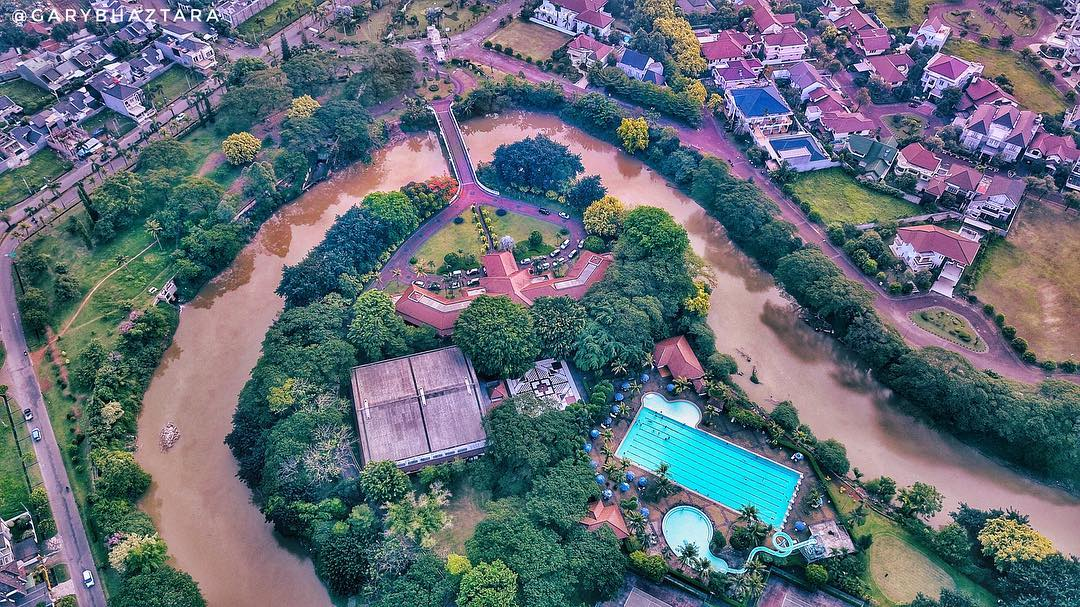
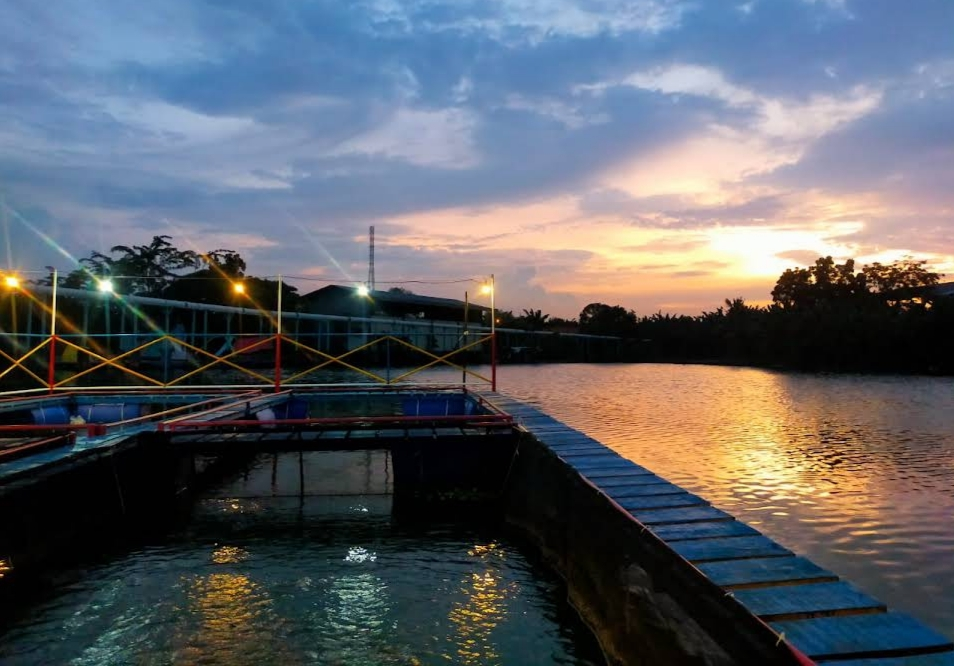
- The meandering of Kali Bekasi passing through Pekayon. The view of Kali Bekasi around Rawalumbu
- The upstream area for the river branches (1), the confluence of the Cikeas and Cileungsi rivers (2), the Kali Bekasi Tragedy (3), the confluence of Kali Bekasi with the CBL canal (4), and the mouth of the CBL canal in Jakarta Bay (5).

Location
- Country: Indonesia
- Province: West Java
- Regency: Bekasi, Bekasi Regency

Physical characteristics
- Source confluence: Cikeas and Cileungsi
- Mouth: Jakarta Bay (Java Sea)
  - location: Babelan, Bekasi Regency
- Basin size: 1,410 km^{2} (540 mi^{2})

Basin features
- River system: DAS Bekasi (DAS220046)
- Tributaries
  - left: Cikeas River
  - right: Cileungsi River
- KML file: Drainage basin of Bekasi

Kali Bekasi (Bekasi River) is an Indonesian river that originates from a confluence of the Cikeas and Cileungsi rivers in the south of the border between the city of Bekasi and Bogor Regency. It flows northward, cutting through the city center of Bekasi towards the downstream area in Bekasi Regency, where it merges the flood control canal CBL (Cikarang-Bekasi-Laut), built during the era of President Soeharto's government in 1977 to prevent flooding in the northern coastal region of Bekasi. This canal intercepts numerous tributaries coming from the south, spanning from Cikarang to Bekasi. From the confluence point in the Babelan district, its flow is directed northwest until it meets the eastern of Jakarta Bay, part of the Java Sea.

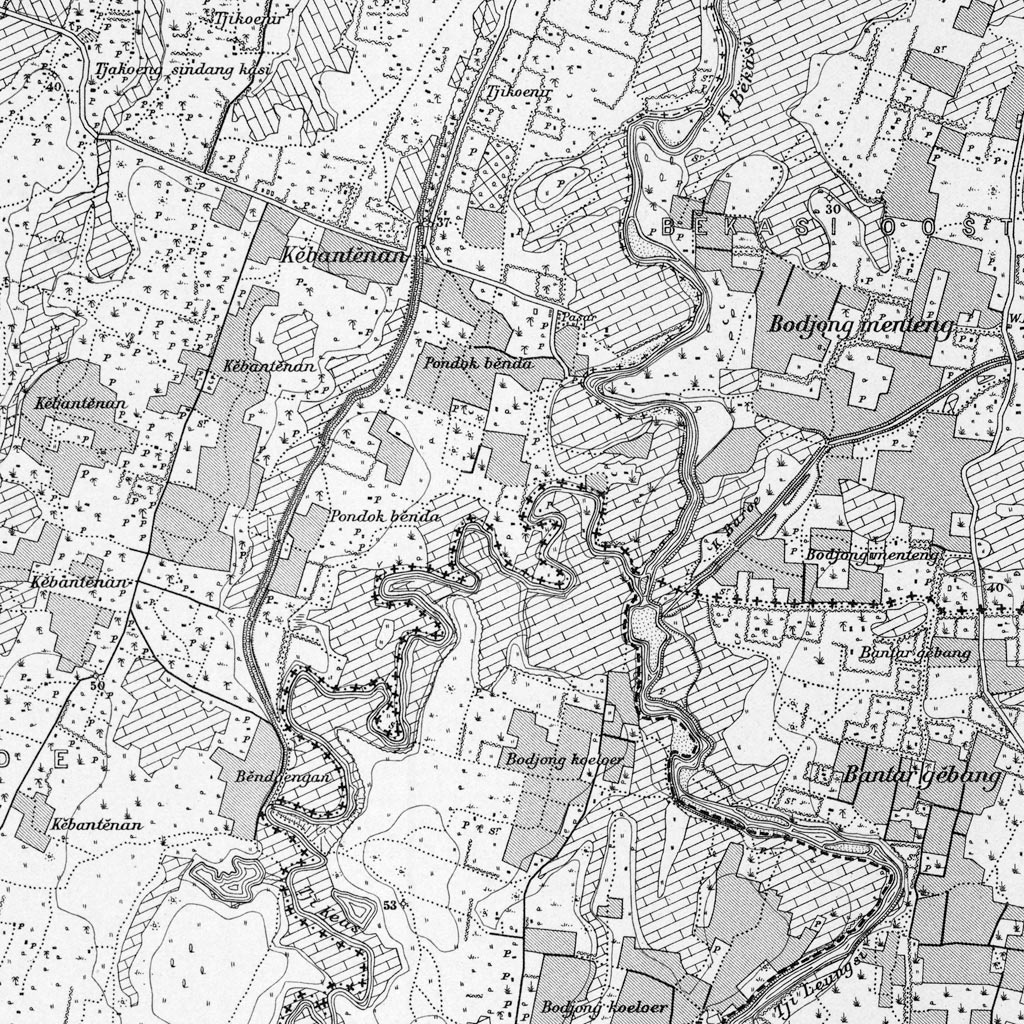
The confluence of the Cikeas and Cileungsi rivers in the upper reaches of the Bekasi River in a 1901 map.

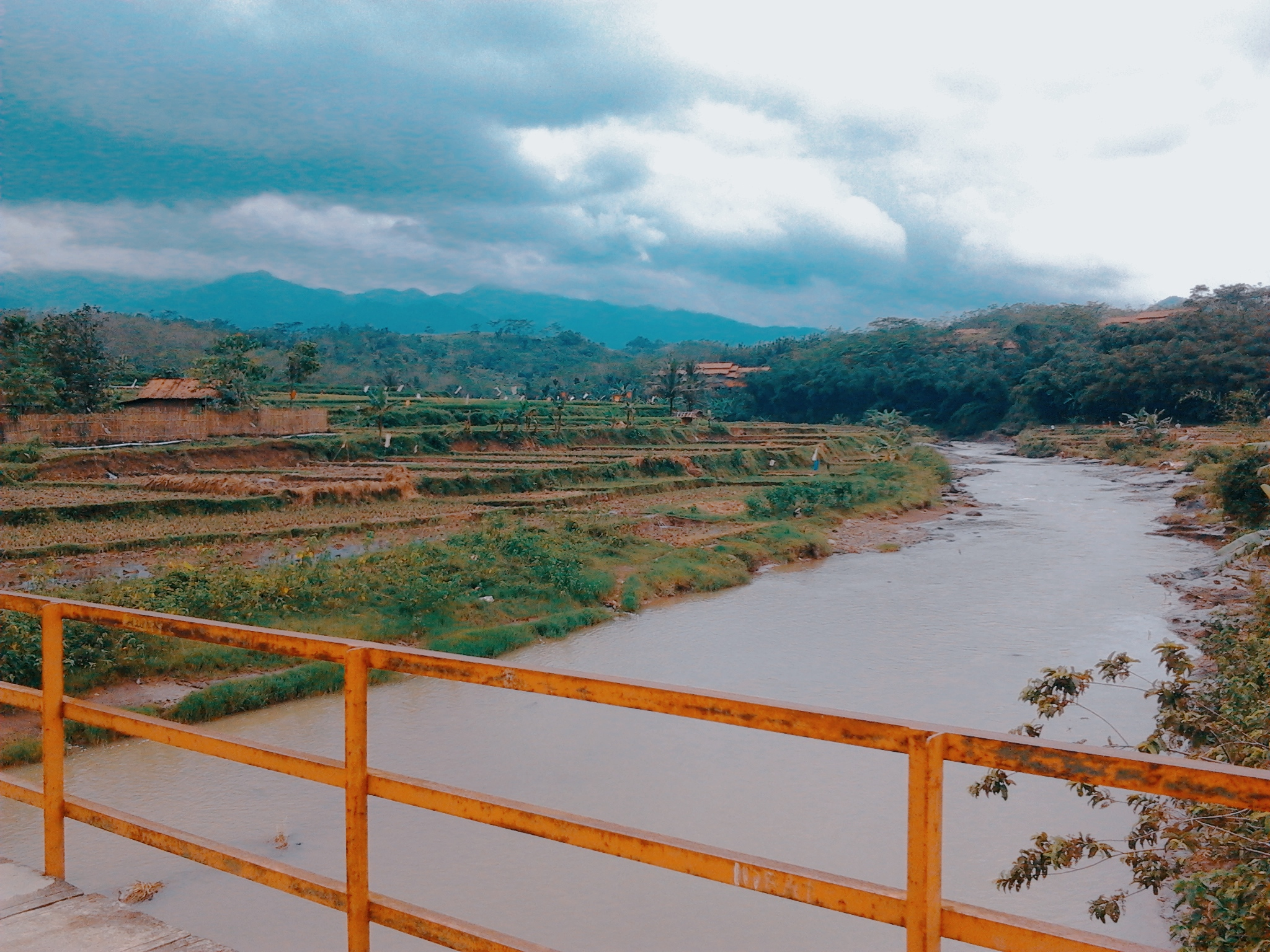
The upstream area of the Bekasi river basin is located in Sukamakmur, Bogor Regency. Cijanggala is a tributary of the upper part of the Cileungsi River, which will later converge with the Cikeas River in the Bantargebang area, marking the boundary between Bogor Regency and the City of Bekasi. This convergence point serves as the headwaters of the Bekasi River.

Kali Bekasi serves as the main stem in the Bekasi river system, covering an area of 1,410 km^{2} (540 mi^{2}). The area includes parts of Bogor Regency in the upper reaches to the mid-section of the basin, parts of the city of Bekasi in the central section of the basin, and a significant portion of Bekasi Regency, extending from the central to the lower part of the basin.

The Bekasi river basin is adjacent to the Citarum river basin on the eastern side, spanning from the upper to the lower reaches of the Bekasi river basin. In the upper southern region, the Bekasi river basin shares its boundary with the upper Ciliwung river basin extending to the west. It is further followed by the Sunter river basin and the Cakung river basin all the way to its lower part.

== Bekasi River Tragedy ==
The tragedy of the massacre of Japanese soldiers on 19 October 1945, around Bekasi Train Station and Bekasi River, is a bloody event that occurred after Indonesia's declaration of independence on 17 August 1945. The event, known as the Bekasi River Tragedy, is one of the episodes of the tumultuous early days of Indonesian independence, demonstrating how political turmoil and wartime mentalities continued to influence post-conflict societal dynamics, significantly affecting the actions of the people of Bekasi towards the Japanese soldiers (kaigun).

After Japan unconditionally surrendered to the Allies during World War II and Indonesia proclaimed its independence on 17 August 1945, the Japanese government began the gradual repatriation of its troops from Indonesia. The repatriation efforts were carried out through Kalijati Airport in Subang. On 19 October 1945, a total of 90 Japanese soldiers, divided into three train cars, were transported by train. The train was scheduled to pass through Bekasi Train Station, a city that had already witnessed significant changes amidst the turmoil of war and post-independence revolution.

A Second Lieutenant named Zakaria Burhanuddin, the Deputy Commander of the Bekasi People's Security Army (TKR), ordered the Bekasi Station Master to divert the train's route from the regular track leading to a bridge to a dead-end track (near the current location of the Kali Bekasi Monument). The train carrying Japanese soldiers was forced to stop on the banks of the Bekasi River to inspect the completeness of travel documents issued by the central government, signed by Ahmad Soebardjo, the Foreign Minister of Indonesia at that time, with the signature of President Sukarno.

The deep-seated hatred and trauma caused by Japanese colonial rule fueled the people's anger. The people of Bekasi forcibly opened the train cars and searched the belongings of the Japanese soldiers. Gunshots from one of the train cars escalated the situation. Provoked, the people launched an attack on the Japanese soldiers inside the train cars. The bodies of the Japanese soldiers killed in the incident were discarded into the Bekasi River.

The central government responded to this tragedy with concern. Admiral Maeda, who served as the Liaison Commander of the Navy and Army of the Imperial Japanese Army, condemned the violence against the Nippon soldiers. He felt that his comrades had been betrayed and requested accountability from the Indonesian government for the Bekasi River Tragedy. The Chief of the Indonesian Police at the time, Lieutenant General Raden Said Soekanto Tjokrodiatmodjo, apologized for the incident and pledged to prevent similar tragedies from recurring. President Sukarno intervened and worked to defuse tensions. On 25 October 1945, Sukarno visited Bekasi to deliver a message of peace to the local community. He urged that such incidents should not happen again, and the people of Bekasi should not engage in harmful acts of violence.

The Indonesian government made efforts to rebuild peace by constructing a monument to commemorate the tragedy. The Bekasi River Monument, known as the Bekasi People's Struggle Front Monument, stands in the place that once witnessed these tragic events. When standing near this monument on Ir. H. Juanda Street, visitors can see visual depictions of the past events. The artwork on the monument depicts the train, Japanese soldiers, and the armed people of Bekasi, reflecting the dramatic atmosphere of that time. This monument was built as a symbol of peace and compassion, serving as a reminder of the importance of avoiding violence in resolving conflicts.

== The Kali Bekasi in the history of ancient floods of the Tarumanegara Kingdom. ==
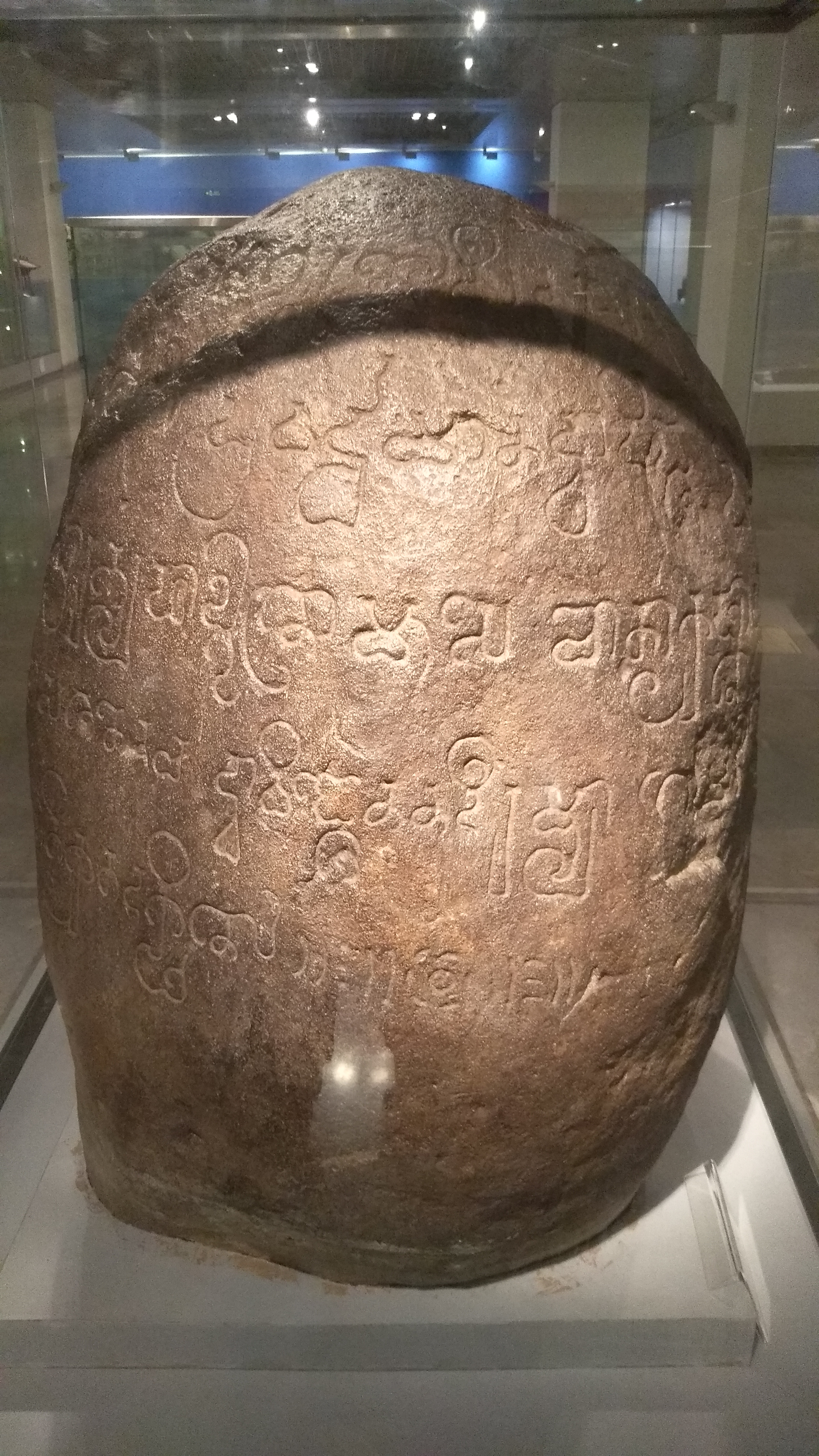
Tugu inscription displayed in National Museum mentioned about King Purnawarman of Tarumanagara.

In the ancient manuscript of the Old Sundanese Inscription (Tatar Sunda Kuno), it is stated that the Candrabhagha River is one of the legacies of the Tarumanegara Kingdom, the second oldest kingdom in the Nusantara that ruled from the 5th to the 7th century AD. In the inscription manuscript, the Candrabhagha River was excavated with the aim of controlling flood disasters at that time. King Purnawarman, who ruled from 317 to 356 Shaka years (395-434 AD), ordered the excavation of the river.

"Once the Candrabhagha River was dug by Purnawarman, the noble Maharaja who had strong and powerful arms. After reaching the palace, the river was directed to the sea. The palace of His Majesty the Most Beloved King. Then His Majesty Parnuwarman ordered the excavation of another river. This river is very beautiful and clear. This river is called the Gomati River. This river flows through the residence of King Purnawarman's grandmother. The Gomati River is 6,122 fathoms long, and this work began on a auspicious day, the 8th Paro Evening of the Phalguna month. Then it was completed on the 13th Paro Bright of the Caitra month. So, it only took 21 days, and for this, a ceremony was held by the Brahmins. For this ceremony, King Purnawarman gave a gift of 1,000 cows."

The Ancient Sunda region, which includes the areas of Banten, Jakarta, Bogor, Bekasi, Karawang, and Purbalingga in Central Java. The capital of the Tarumanegara Kingdom was located north of Bekasi, precisely in the Babelan and Tarumajaya areas, Bekasi Regency. This is reinforced by the abundance of artifacts found at several sites there.

First, the change of the word from Candrabhaga to Bekasi was suggested by Prof. Dr. R. Ng. Poerbatjaraka in 1951, a philology expert at the University of Indonesia who obtained a doctorate at Leiden University, the Netherlands, in Javanese literature in 1926. He stated that Bekasi comes from the word Candrabhaga, the name of a river built in the 5th century AD by the Tarumanagara King named Rajadhiraja Yang Mulia Purnawarman. This data is mentioned in the Tugu Inscription, Cilincing, North Jakarta.

Then the word Candrabhaga is divided into two, namely Candra which means "moon" and Bhaga which means "happy." The word Chandra in Sanskrit is the same as the word Sasi in ancient Javanese, so the name Candrabhaga is identical to the word Sasibhaga, which, when translated in reverse, becomes Bhagasasi. Based on this, Poerbatjaraka interpreted the Candrabhaga River as identical to the Bekasi River.

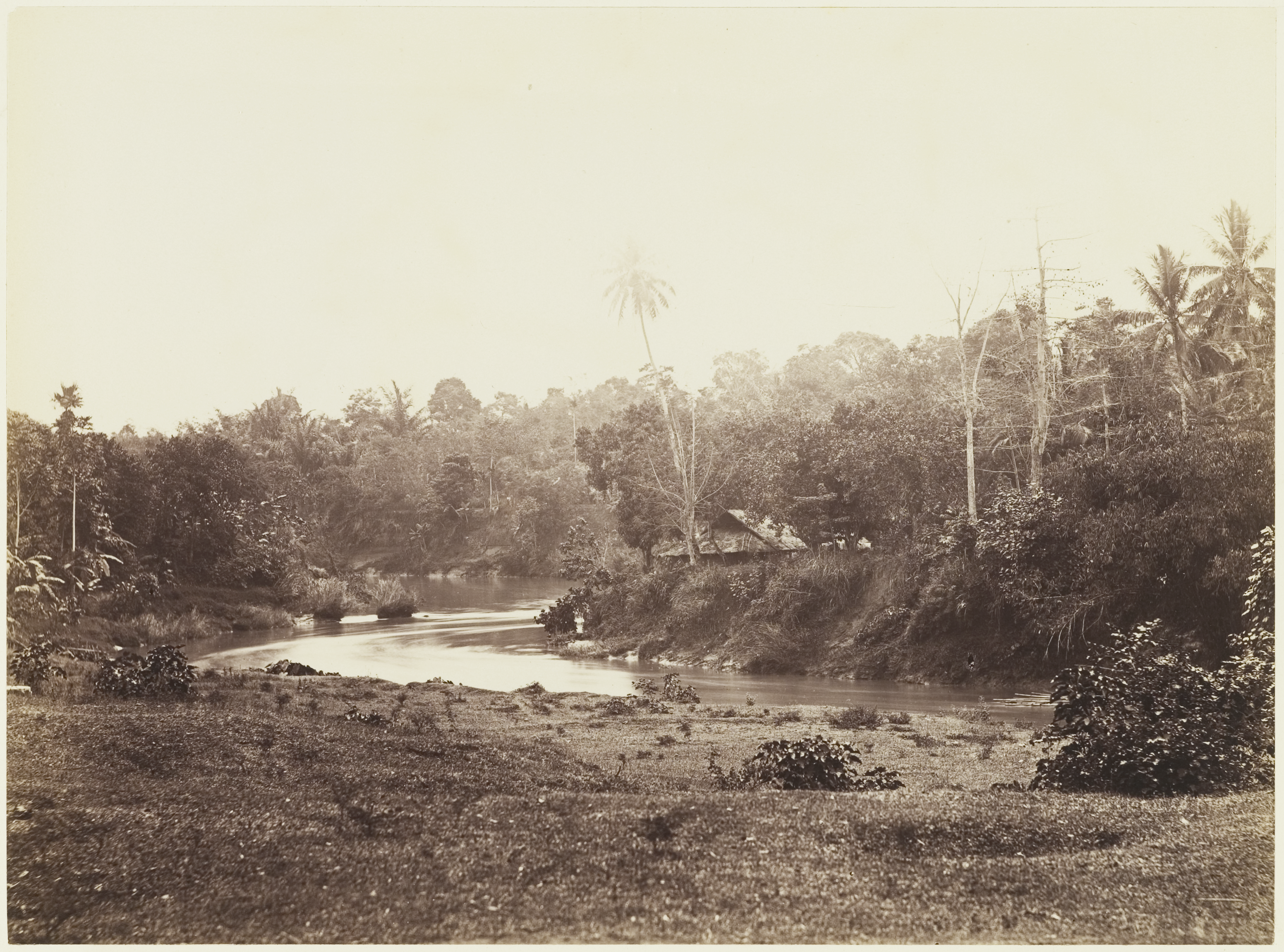
A photo of the Bekasi River that was published prior to 1880
