= Pondok Melati, Bekasi =

Coordinates: 6°15′20″S 106°58′07″E

Pondok Melati
- District
- Location in Bekasi, Java and Indonesia Pondok Melati (Java) Pondok Melati (Indonesia)
- Country: Indonesia
- Province: West Java
- City: Bekasi

Area
  - Total: 11.02 km^{2} (4.25 sq mi)

Population (mid 2023 estimate)
  - Total: 132,560
  - Density: 12,030/km^{2} (31,160/sq mi)
- Time zone: UTC+7 (IWST)
- Area code: (+62) 21
- Vehicle registration: B
- Villages: 4
- Website: kec-pondok%20melati.bekasikota.go.id

Pondok Melati is one of the twelve administrative districts (kecamatan) within the city municipality of Bekasi, in Jabodetabek (Jakarta's metropolitan area) on the island of Java, Indonesia. The district covers an area of 1,102 hectares (2,723 acres), and had a population of 128,934 at the 2010 Census and 131,122 at the 2020 Census; the official estimate as at mid 2023 was 128,690 - comprising 64,295 males and 64,395 females.mid 2023 estimate

The administrative centre is located in Jati Rahayu, and the district is sub-divided into four urban "villages" or communities (kelurahan), as listed below with their areas and their populations as at mid 2023, together with their postcodes.

| Kode Wilayah | Name of kelurahan | Area in km^{2} | Population mid 2023 estimate | Post code |
|---|---|---|---|---|
| 32.75.12.1001 | Jati Rahayu | 3.60 | 57,547 | 17414 |
| 32.75.12.1002 | Jati Warna | 1.82 | 23,008 | 17415 |
| 32.75.12.1003 | Jati Melati | 2.76 | 21,275 | 17414 |
| 32.75.12.1004 | Jati Murni | 2.83 | 26,860 | 17431 |
| 32.75.12 | Totals | 11.02 | 128,690 | |
