= West Bekasi =

Coordinates: 6°15′20″S 106°58′07″E

West Bekasi Bekasi Barat
- District
- Location in Bekasi, Java and Indonesia West Bekasi (Java) West Bekasi (Indonesia)
- Country: Indonesia
- Province: West Java
- City: Bekasi

Area
  - Total: 14.90 km^{2} (5.75 sq mi)

Population (mid 2023 estimate)
  - Total: 266,287
- Time zone: UTC+7 (IWST)
- Area code: (+62) 21
- Vehicle registration: B
- Villages: 5
- Website: kec-bekasibarat.bekasikota.go.id

West Bekasi (Indonesian: Bekasi Barat) is one of the twelve administrative districts (kecamatan) within the municipality of Bekasi, in Jabodetabek (Jakarta's metropolitan area) on the island of Java, Indonesia. The district covers an area of 1,490 hectares (3,682 acres), and had a population of 272,557 at the 2010 Census and 281,681 at the 2020 Census; the official estimate as at mid 2023 was 266,287 - comprising 133,054 males and 133,233 females.

The administrative centre is located in Bintara, and the district is sub-divided into five urban "villages" or communities (kelurahan), as listed below with their areas and their populations as at mid 2023, together with their postcodes.

Kode Wilayah	Name of kelurahan	Area in km^{2}	Population mid 2023 estimate	Post code
32.75.02.1001	Bintara	3.40	62,975	17134
32.75.02.1002	Kranji	1.80	49,610	17135
32.75.02.1003	Kota Baru	2.01	44,863	17133
32.75.02.1004	Bintara Jaya	2.69	34,159	17136
32.75.02.1005	Jaka Sampurna	5.01	74,680	17145
32.75.02	Totals	14.90	266,287	
