= North Bekasi =

Coordinates: 6°15′20″S 106°58′07″E

North Bekasi Bekasi Utara
- District
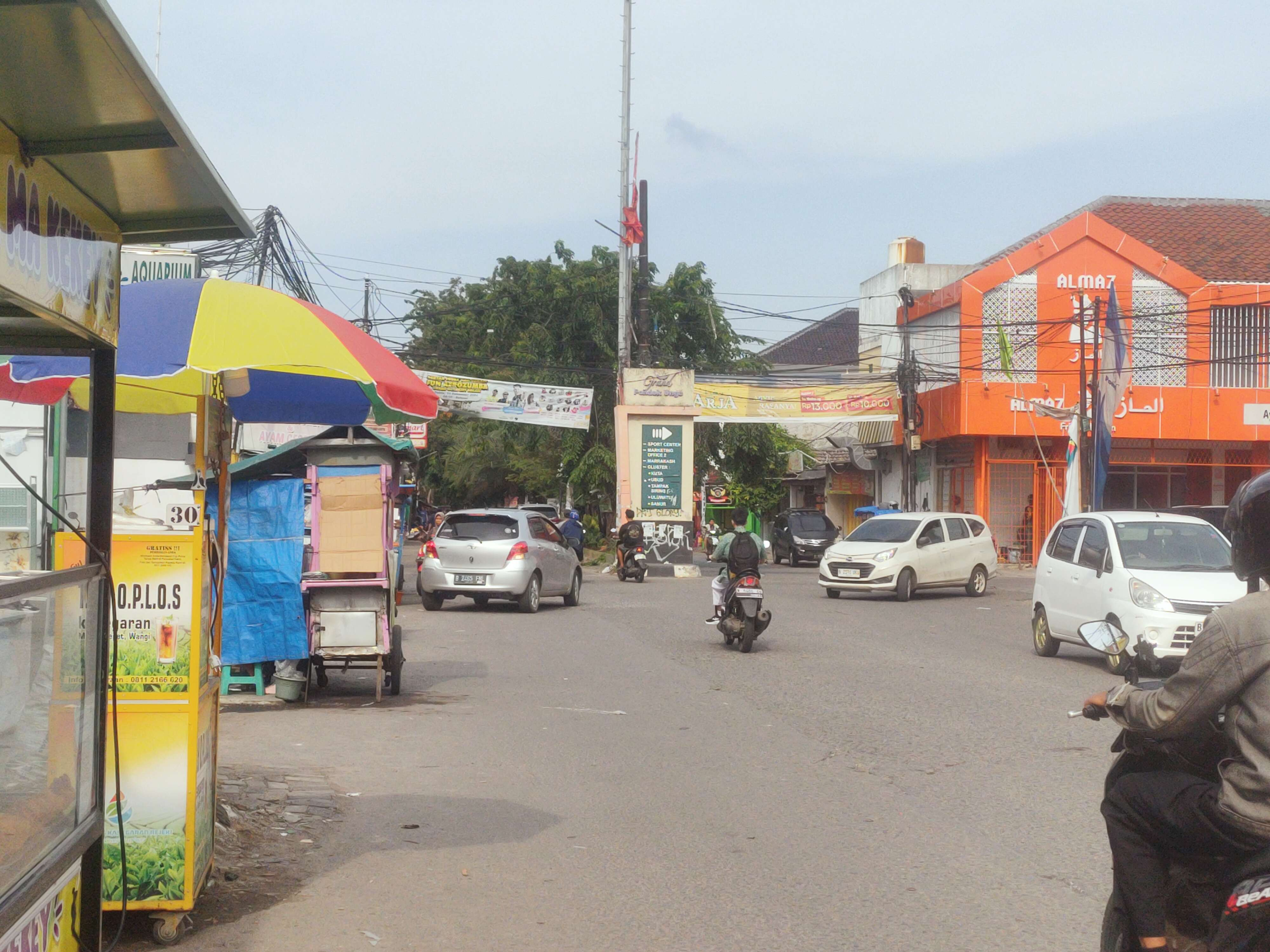
- Pondok Ungu Permai, Kaliabang Tengah

- Location in Bekasi, Java and Indonesia North Bekasi (Java) North Bekasi (Indonesia)
- Country: Indonesia
- Province: West Java
- City: Bekasi

Area
  - Total: 20.81 km^{2} (8.03 sq mi)

Population (mid 2023 estimate)
  - Total: 338,087
- Time zone: UTC+7 (IWST)
- Area code: (+62) 21
- Vehicle registration: B
- Villages: 6
- Website: kec-bekasiutara.bekasikota.go.id

North Bekasi (Indonesian: Bekasi Utara) is one of the twelve administrative districts (kecamatan) within the city municipality of Bekasi, in Jabodetabek (Jakarta's metropolitan area) on the island of Java, Indonesia. The district covers an area of 2,081 hectares (5,142 acres), and had a population of 308,593 at the 2010 Census and 337,013 at the 2020 Census; the official estimate as at mid 2023 was 338,087 - comprising 169,528 males and 168,559 females.

The administrative centre is located in Perwira, and the district is sub-divided into six urban "villages" or communities (kelurahan), as listed below with their areas and their populations as at mid 2023, together with their postcodes.

Kode Wilayah	Name of kelurahan	Area in km^{2}	Population mid 2023 estimate	Post code
32.75.03.1001	Kaliabang Tengah	4.66	94,383	17125
32.75.03.1002	Perwira	2.29	39,149	17122
32.75.03.1003	Harapan Baru	2.54	27,235	17123
32.75.03.1004	Teluk Pucung	3.54	69,982	17121
32.75.03.1005	Marga Mulya	2.89	24,208	17142
32.75.03.1006	Harapan Jaya	4.89	83,130	17124
32.75.03	Totals	20.81	338,087	
