= East Bekasi =

Coordinates: 6°15′20″S 106°58′07″E

East Bekasi Bekasi Timur
- District
- Location in Bekasi, Java and Indonesia East Bekasi (Java) East Bekasi (Indonesia)
- Country: Indonesia
- Province: West Java
- City: Bekasi

Area
  - Total: 14.64 km^{2} (5.65 sq mi)

Population (mid 2023 estimate)
  - Total: 273,703
- Time zone: UTC+7 (IWST)
- Area code: (+62) 21
- Vehicle registration: B
- Villages: 4
- Website: kec-bekasitimur.bekasikota.go.id

East Bekasi (Indonesian: Bekasi Timur) is one of the twelve administrative districts (kecamatan) within the municipality of Bekasi, in Jabodetabek (Jakarta's metropolitan area) on the island of Java, Indonesia. The district covers an area of 1,464 hectares (3,618 acres), and had a population of 247,357 at the 2010 Census and 257,025 at the 2020 Census; the official estimate as at mid 2023 was 273,703 - comprising 136,428 males and 137,275.

The administrative centre is located in Bekasi Jaya, and the district is sub-divided into four urban "villages" or communities (kelurahan), as listed below with their areas and their populations as at mid 2023, together with their postcodes.

Kode Wilayah	Name of kelurahan	Area in km^{2}	Population mid 2023 estimate	Post code
32.75.01.1001	Bekasi Jaya	3.48	65,635	17112
32.75.01.1002	Margahayu	4.66	66,527	17113
32.75.01.1003	Duren Jaya	3.64	75,359	17111
32.75.01.1004	Aren Jaya	2.86	66,182	17111
32.75.01	Totals	14.64	273,703	
