= Mustikajaya =

Coordinates: 6°15′20″S 106°58′07″E

- District
- Location in Bekasi, Java and Indonesia Mustikajaya (Java) Mustikajaya (Indonesia)
- Country: Indonesia
- Province: West Java
- City: Bekasi

Area
  - Total: 24.76 km^{2} (9.56 sq mi)
- Elevation: 54 m (177 ft)

Population (mid 2023 estimate)
  - Total: 216,604
  - Density: 8,748/km^{2} (22,660/sq mi)
- Time zone: UTC+7 (IWST)
- Area code: (+62) 21
- Vehicle registration: B
- Urban villages: 4
- Website: kec-mustikajaya.bekasikota.go.id

Mustikajaya is one of the twelve administrative districts (kecamatan) within the city municipality of Bekasi, in Jabodetabek (Jakarta's metropolitan area) on the island of Java, Indonesia. The district covers an area of 2,476 hectares (6,118 acres), and had a population of 159,773 at the 2010 Census and 213,515 at the 2020 Census; the official estimate as at mid 2023 was 216,604 – comprising 108,783 males and 107,721 females.

== Administrative divisions ==
The administrative centre is located in Musikajaya kelurahan, and the district is sub-divided into four urban villages or communities (kelurahan), as listed below with their areas and their populations as at mid 2023, together with their postcodes.

Kode Wilayah	Name of kelurahan	Area in km^{2}	Population mid 2023 estimate	Post code
32.75.11.1001	Padurenan	7.63	56,565	17156
32.75.11.1002	Cimuning	5.48	43,767	17155
32.75.11.1003	Mustikajaya	6.80	77,483	17158
32.75.11.1004	Mustikasari	4.84	38,789	17157
32.75.11	Totals	24.76	216,604	

== Demographics ==
=== Language ===
Although currently the majority of the residents of this district use Indonesian language and Betawi language, however, some of the native residents still use Sundanese language. Its speakers can mainly be found in the sub-districts of Cimuning and Padurenan. In addition, Sundanese speakers can also be found in the districts of Bantargebang and Jatisampurna, where its use is still dominant, even in some sub-districts it is the main language. The Sundanese language used in this region is a dialect similar to Bogor Sundanese, especially in the northern region, namely Bekasi Sundanese.
