= Jatiasih =

Coordinates: 6°15′20″S 106°58′07″E

- District
- Location in Bekasi, Java and Indonesia Jatiasih (Java) Jatiasih (Indonesia)
- Country: Indonesia
- Province: West Java
- City: Bekasi
- Established: 11 January 1992

Area
  - Total: 24.26 km^{2} (9.37 sq mi)
- Elevation: 49 m (161 ft)

Population (mid 2023 estimate)
  - Total: 239,159
  - Density: 9,858/km^{2} (25,530/sq mi)
- Time zone: UTC+7 (IWST)
- Area code: (+62) 21
- Vehicle registration: B
- Villages: 5
- Website: kec-jatiasih.bekasikota.go.id

Jatiasih is one of the twelve administrative districts (kecamatan) within the city municipality of Bekasi, in Jabodetabek (Jakarta's metropolitan area) on the island of Java, Indonesia. The district covers an area of 2,426 hectares (5,995 acres), and had a population of 198,444 at the 2010 Census and 247,362 at the 2020 Census; the official estimate as at mid 2023 was 239,159 - comprising 119,326 males and 119,823 remales.

Jatiasih was previously part of Pondok Gede district before it was split off from the southeastern part of the district in 1992.

The administrative centre is located in Jatiasih kelurahan, and the district is sub-divided into six urban "villages" or communities (kelurahan), as listed below with their areas and their populations as at mid 2022, together with their postcodes.

Kode Wilayah	Name of kelurahan	Area in km^{2}	Population mid 2023 estimate	Post code
32.75.09.1001	Jati Mekar	4.53	40,268	17422
32.75.09.1002	Jatiasih	3.63	37,678	17423
32.75.09.1003	Jati Kramat	3.54	45,574	17421
32.75.09.1004	Jati Rasa	2.97	40,521	17424
32.75.09.1005	Jati Luhur	4.13	34,475	17425
32.75.09.1006	Jati Sari	5.46	40,643	17426
32.75.09	Totals	24.26	239,159	
