= Jatisampurna, Bekasi =

Coordinates: 6°15′20″S 106°58′07″E

Jatisampurna
- District
- Location in Bekasi, Java and Indonesia Jatisampurna (Java) Jatisampurna (Indonesia)
- Country: Indonesia
- Province: West Java
- City: Bekasi

Area
  - Total: 20.19 km^{2} (7.80 sq mi)
- Elevation: 85 m (279 ft)
- Highest elevation: 97 m (318 ft)
- Lowest elevation: 49 m (161 ft)

Population (mid 2023 estimate)
  - Total: 114,108
  - Density: 5,652/km^{2} (14,640/sq mi)
- Time zone: UTC+7 (IWST)
- Area code: (+62) 21
- Vehicle registration: B
- Villages: 5
- Website: kec-jatisampurna.bekasikota.go.id

Jatisampurna is one of the twelve administrative districts (kecamatan) within the city municipality of Bekasi, in Jabodetabek (Jakarta's metropolitan area) on the island of Java, Indonesia. The district covers an area of 2,019 hectares (4,989 acres), and had a population of 103,715 at the 2010 Census and 123,924 at the 2020 Census; the official estimate as at mid 2023 was 114,108 – comprising 56,912 males and 57,196 females.

== Administrative divisions ==
The administrative centre is located in Jatisampurna kelurahan, and the district is sub-divided into five urban "villages" or communities (kelurahan), as listed below with their areas and their populations as at mid 2023, together with their postcodes.

Kode Wilayah	Name of kelurahan	Area in km^{2}	Population mid 2023 estimate	Post code
32.75.10.1001	Jatisampurna	4.19	30,627	17433
32.75.10.1002	Jatikarya	5.15	15,781	17435
32.75.10.1003	Jatiranggon	3.22	28,026	17432
32.75.10.1004	Jatirangga	4.54	18,316	17434
32.75.10.1005	Jatiraden	3.08	21,358	17433
32.75.10	Totals	20.19	114,108	

== Demographics ==
=== Languages ===
Jatisampurna district is one of the districts in Bekasi where the majority of its native population still speaks Sundanese. In addition, Sundanese speakers can also be found in the districts of Bantargebang and Mustikajaya, especially in the sub-districts of Cimuning and Padurenan. The Sundanese language used in this region is a dialect similar to Bogor Sundanese, namely Bekasi Sundanese, especially in the northern region.
