= Rawalumbu =

Coordinates: 6°15′20″S 106°58′07″E

- District
- Location in Bekasi, Java and Indonesia Rawalumbu (Java) Rawalumbu (Indonesia)
- Country: Indonesia
- Province: West Java
- City: Bekasi

Area
  - Total: 16.85 km^{2} (6.51 sq mi)

Population (mid 2023 estimate)
  - Total: 222,398
  - Density: 13,200/km^{2} (34,180/sq mi)
- Time zone: UTC+7 (IWST)
- Area code: (+62) 21
- Vehicle registration: B
- Villages: 6
- Website: kec-rawalumbu.bekasikota.go.id

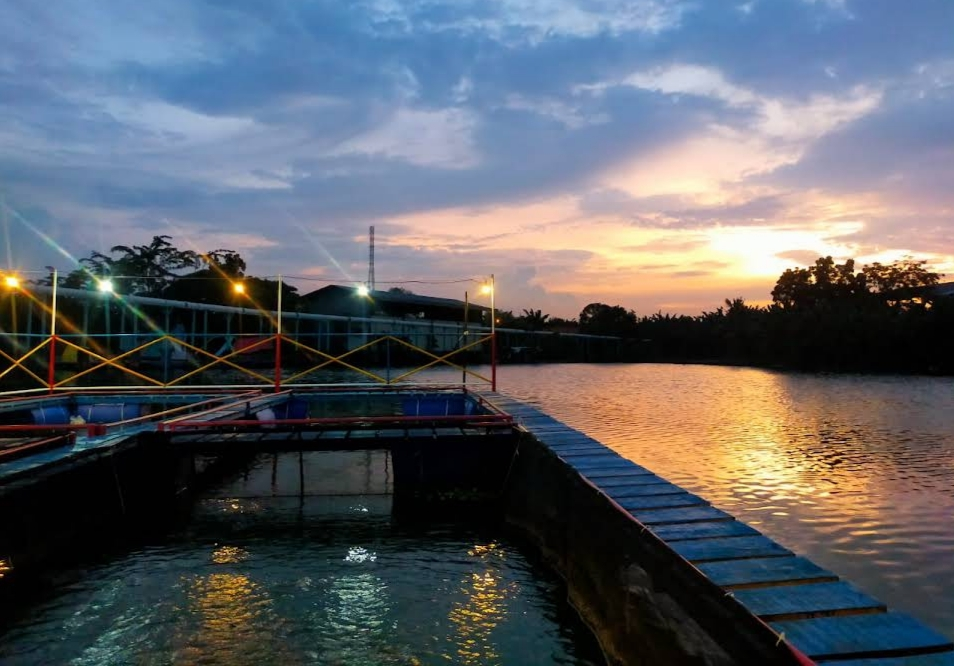
Rawalumbu, Bekasi, Indonesia.

Rawalumbu is one of the twelve administrative districts (kecamatan) within the city municipality of Bekasi, in Jabodetabek (Jakarta's metropolitan area) on the island of Java, Indonesia. The district covers an area of 1,685 hectares (4,164 acres), and had a population of 208,334 at the 2010 Census and 220,699 at the 2020 Census; the official estimate as at mid 2023 was 222,398 - comprising 111,408 males and 110,990 females.

The administrative centre is located in Bojong Rawalumbu, and the district is sub-divided into four urban "villages" or communities (kelurahan), as listed below with their areas and their populations as at mid 2023, together with their postcodes.

Kode Wilayah	Name of kelurahan	Area in km^{2}	Population mid 2023 estimate	Post code
32.75.05.1001	Bojong Rawalumbu	6.39	78,915	17116
32.75.05.1002	Pengasinan	3.49	62,048	17115
32.75.05.1003	Sepanjang Jaya	3.02	36,825	17114
32.75.05.1004	Bojong Menteng	3.95	44,610	17117
32.75.05	Totals	16.85	222,398	
