= Mall of Indonesia =

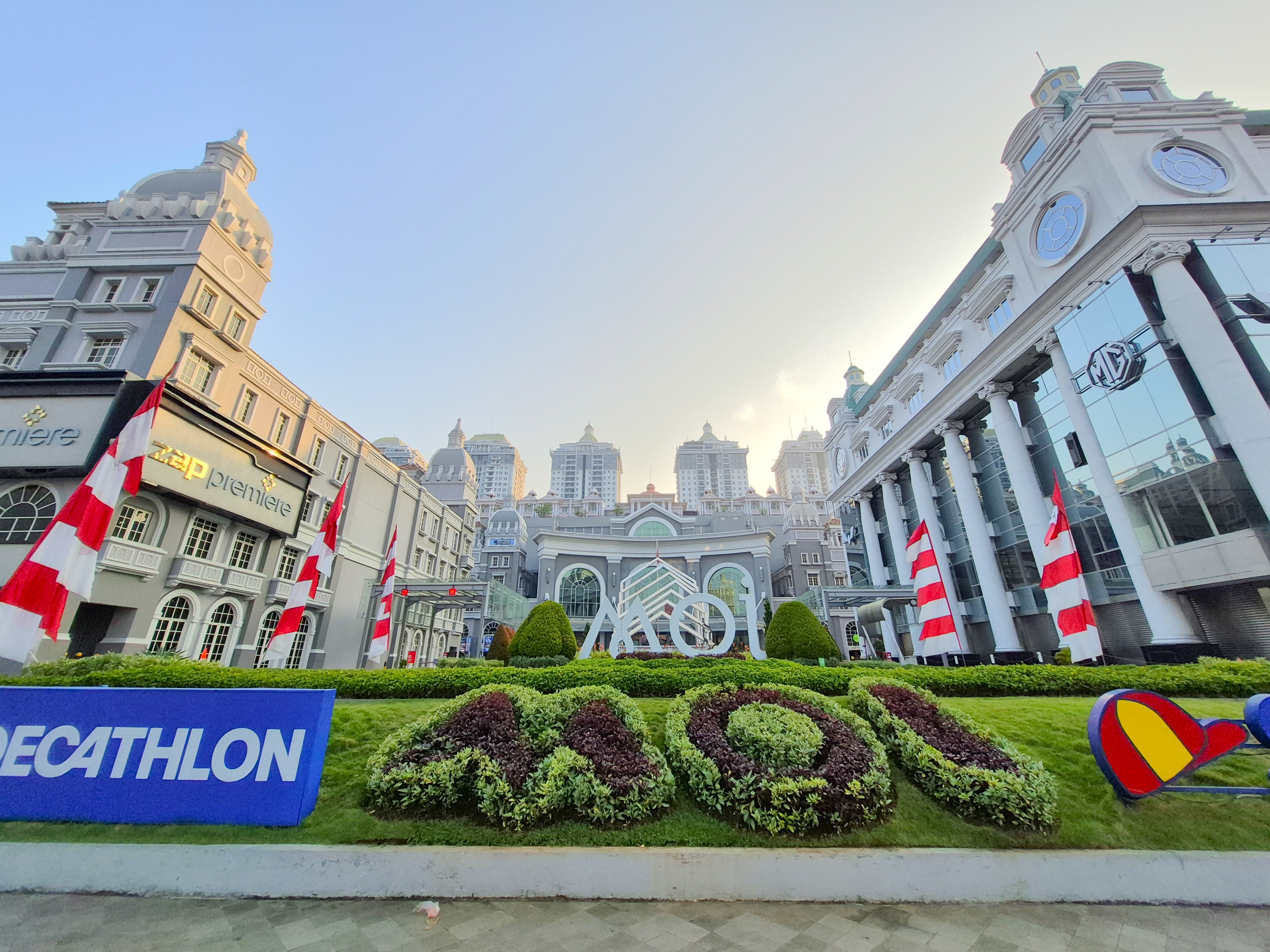
- Location: Jakarta, Indonesia
- Coordinates: 6.1511°S 106.8922°E
- Address: Jl. Raya Boulevard Barat, Kelapa Gading, North Jakarta
- Opened: 8 August 2008
- Developer: Agung Sedayu Group
- Manager: Agung Sedayu Group
- Owner: Agung Sedayu Group
- Floor area: 1 ha (110,000 sq ft)
- Floors: 5
- Parking: 3,000 cars and 8,000 motorcycles
- Website: www.mallofindonesia.com

The Mall of Indonesia (abbrievated as MOI) is a mall in Kelapa Gading, North Jakarta. Located in front of Kelapa Gading Square, it was built by the Agung Sedayu Group. Several major anchor stores can be found in the mall, including Carrefour, Uniqlo and Flix Cinema (formerly CGV).

Construction of the mall began in 2003 and was initially completed in 2006. However, it was only completed in September 2008. Previously, the Carrefour supermarket was opened in 2006 and followed by CGV which opened its third branch in Jakarta and the only CGV available in Kelapa Gading. Centro Department Store was opened on 5 September 2008, completing the opened anchors. Then newly-opened tenants include Moiland and Fun World. Beginning in November 2008, MOI opened Food Park which has the mall's main food court.

In 2019, Centro Department Store was replaced by Uniqlo, while CGV Cinemas was replaced by FLIX Cinema, a flagship cinema owned by Agung Sedayu Group. Singaporean amusement arcade centre Cow Play Cow Moo was opened at MOI on 14 February 2025.
