= Fun World (Indonesian video arcades) =

PT Funworld Prima
- Trade name: Fun World
- Company type: Private
- Industry: Entertainment
- Founded: 1983; 43 years ago
- Founder: Rachmat Sutiono
- Number of locations: 200
- Key people: David Sutiono; Daniel Sutiono
- Subsidiaries: Kidzlandia Playgrounds
- Website: funworld.co.id

PT Funworld Prima, doing business as Fun World, is an Indonesian entertainment company headquartered in Jakarta, established in 1983 by Rachmat Sutiono. It is the current member of the Indonesian Family Recreation Association (formerly the Indonesian Coin-Operated Arcade Machine Association). As of 2023, the company has over 200 locations in Indonesia.

== History ==
In the 1980s, Rachmat Sutiono, a former oil distributor of Pertamina, attempted to diversify businesses, including the companies that does not have entertainment chains. After its failure, he found the business through cash basis, with three cash-based businesses that he studied including food, retail and entertainment. To attract more attention, Sutiono attempted to combine the elements of retail and entertainment.

Sutiono traveled to Japan and visited some of the amusement parks, one of them being the Karakuen Amusement Park in Tokyo. He entered queue of the jack coaster because he tried it, while Indonesian college students queued in front of him.

After opening his theme parks at Kings Supermarket in Jakarta and the Kings Shopping Centre in the West Java, Sutiono opened the first Fun World — his first arcade — on the Metropolitan Mall, Bekasi, in 1993.

On 2 December 2022, Fun World established its new playground brand Kidzlandia aiming at children aged two to twelve years.

== Tach System ==
Fun World arcade system moved to a contactless card system known as the Tach System in 2022, replacing the Fun Card system. This means that customers, rather than having to carry many coins around, could simply deposit a larger amount of money onto their Tach card account.

Fun World chains now use Goldies as their game currency.
