= Al-Barkah Mosque =

Mosque in Bekasi, West Java, Indonesia

Al-Barkah Great Mosque Masjid Agung Al-Barkah
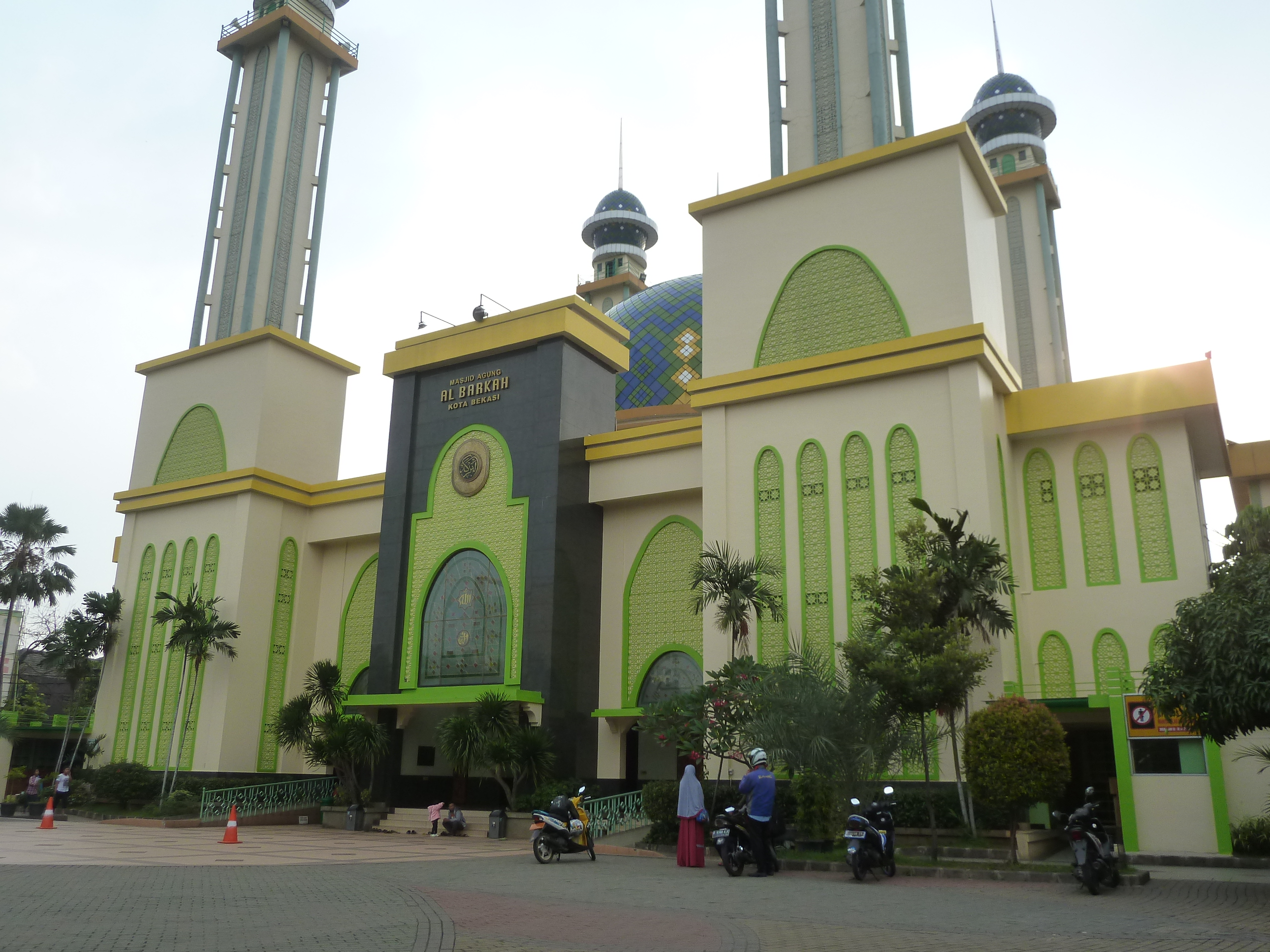

Religion
- Affiliation: Islam
- Branch/tradition: Sunni

Location
- Location: Bekasi, West Java, Indonesia
- Interactive map of Al-Barkah Great Mosque; Masjid Agung Al-Barkah
- Coordinates: 6°14′27″S 106°59′58″E

Architecture
- Type: Mosque
- Style: Islamic architecture
- Groundbreaking: 1890
- Completed: 1894

Specifications
- Capacity: 10,000
- Dome: 2
- Dome height (outer): 20
- Minaret: 4
- Minaret height: 40

Al-Barkah Great Mosque (Indonesian: Masjid Agung Al-Barkah) is a congregational mosque in the city of Bekasi, West Java, Indonesia. Opened in 1894, it is the largest mosque in City of Bekasi.

== Description ==
Al Barkah Grand Mosque is a landmark in Bekasi, and has undergone several renovations. It was constructed in 1890, located several meters from the town square. The main door is made of teak wood with geometric carvings typical of the Middle East.

Preparations for the construction of the Al-Barkah Grand Mosque in Bekasi city began in 2003 with the rearrangement of the layout of the town square, roads and other existing facilities. The mosque was designed to be more modern, but still characterized by Middle Eastern architecture. There was a desire from the mayor at that time to present a representative grand mosque and become an icon of the city of Bekasi. The mosque, which can accommodate up to 10,000 worshipers, only accommodated 2,500 worshipers during the implementation of the Eid al-Fitr Prayer 1443 H (May 2, 2022), because it implemented health protocols.
