= Summarecon Bekasi =

Planned township in Bekasi, West Java, Indonesia

Coordinates: 6.1334°S 107.0010°E

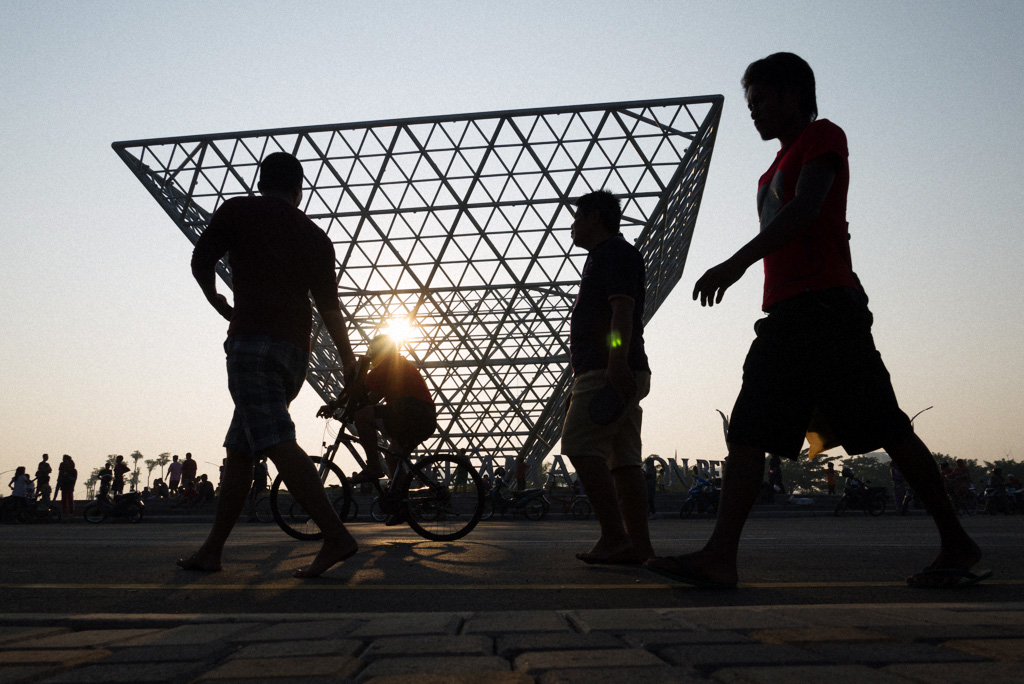
People taking a jog nearby the Summarecon Bekasi roundabout, with its iconic upside-down pyramid landmark.

Summarecon Bekasi is a planned township at Bekasi, Indonesia, located within Greater Jakarta metropolitan area. The development has a land area of about 240 hectares. The township is divided into commercial and a residential zone.

== Facilities ==
- Summarecon Mall Bekasi
- Al-Azhar Islamic School
- BINUS University.
- HARRIS Hotel & Conventions Bekasi
- Sekolah BPK Penabur Summarecon Bekasi
- Pasar Modern Sinpasa
- Amongan

== Summarecon Mall Bekasi ==
Summarecon Mall Bekasi was opened on 28 June 2013 and has a retail area of over 60,000 m^{2}. The shopping center is complemented by facilities such as The Downtown Walk, Food Temptation, Bekasi Food City and Atrium which can be used for event and exhibition events. The Harris Hotel & Conventions Bekasi is built adjoining the mall.

== Transportation ==
The township has direct access to Jakarta-Cikampek Toll Road at West Bekasi Toll Gate (km 12). Transjakarta operates one feeder route from the township to Jakarta, namely route B11 (Summarecon Bekasi–Cawang). Transjakarta also caters two premium feeder bus routes named Royaltrans: B13 (Summarecon Bekasi–Blok M) and B14 (Summarecon Bekasi–Kuningan). Shuttle buses are available within the township. There is a 1-kilometer long flyover, which connects the township main avenues of Bekasi.

== See also ==
- Bekasi
- Jabodetabek
