= Bekasi =

Largest city in West Java, Indonesia

- City
- City of Bekasi; Kota Bekasi

Other transcription(s)
  - Betawi: Bekasih Kota'
  - Sundanese: ᮓᮚᮩᮂ ᮘᮨᮊᮞᮤ
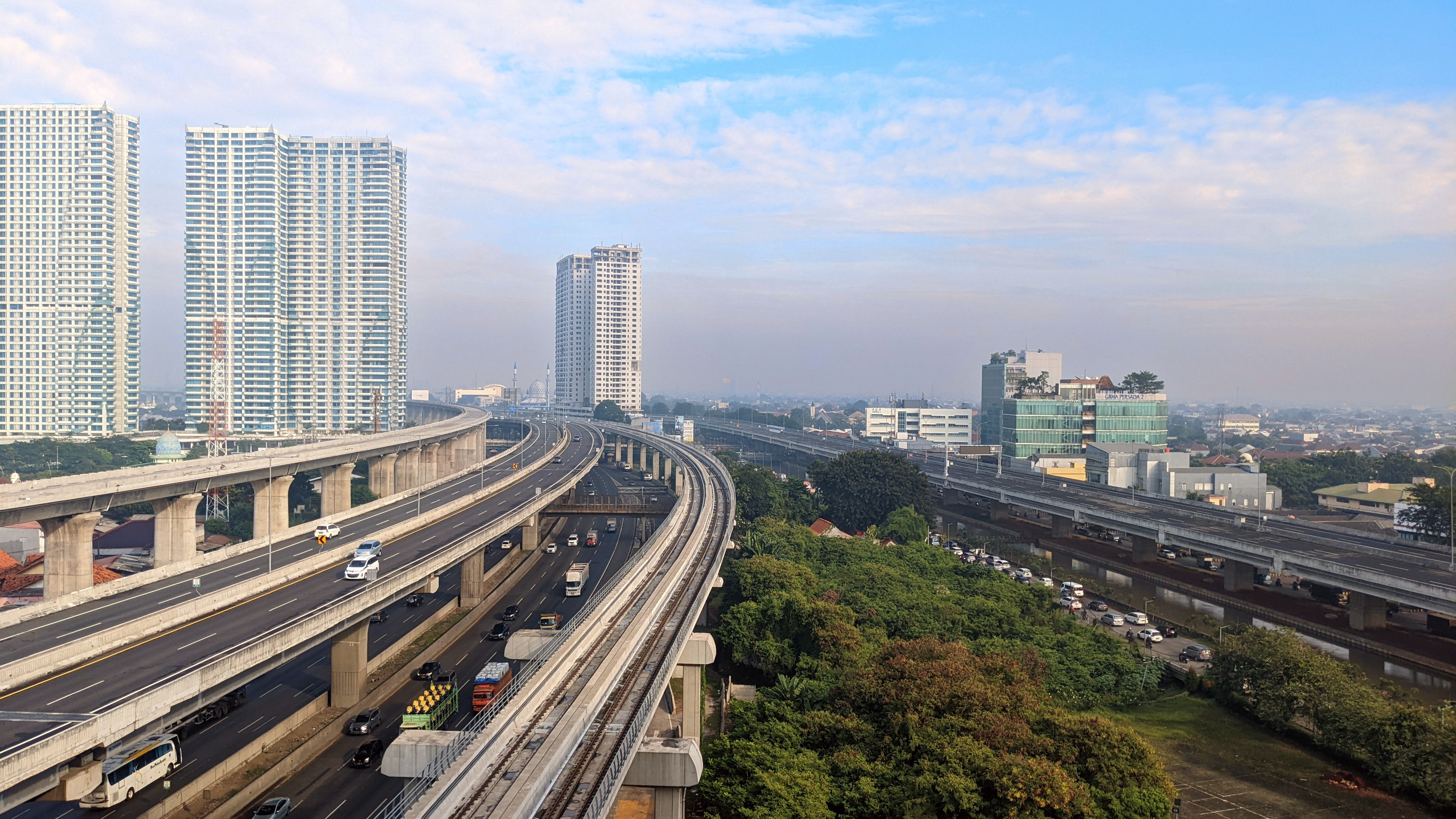
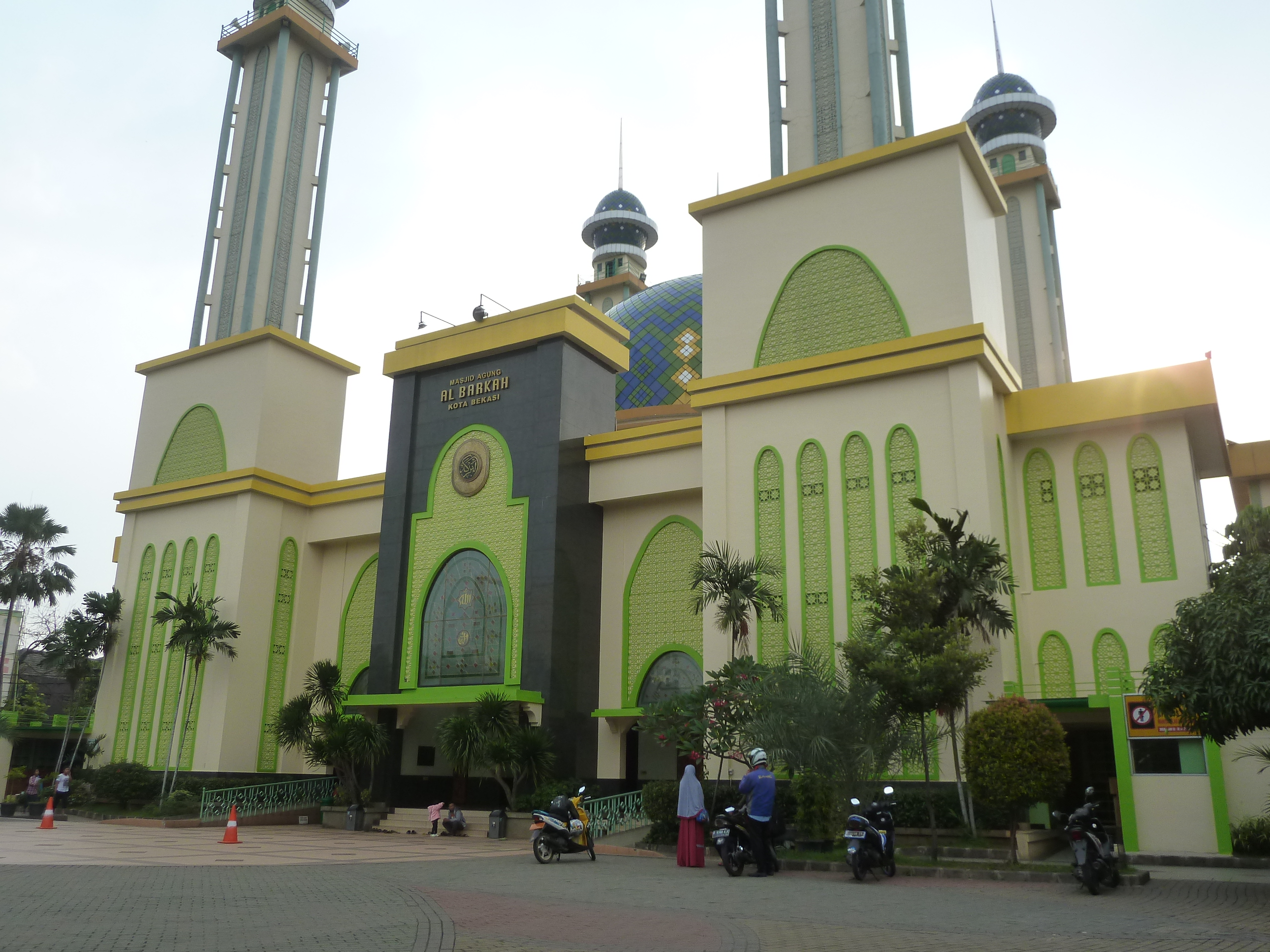
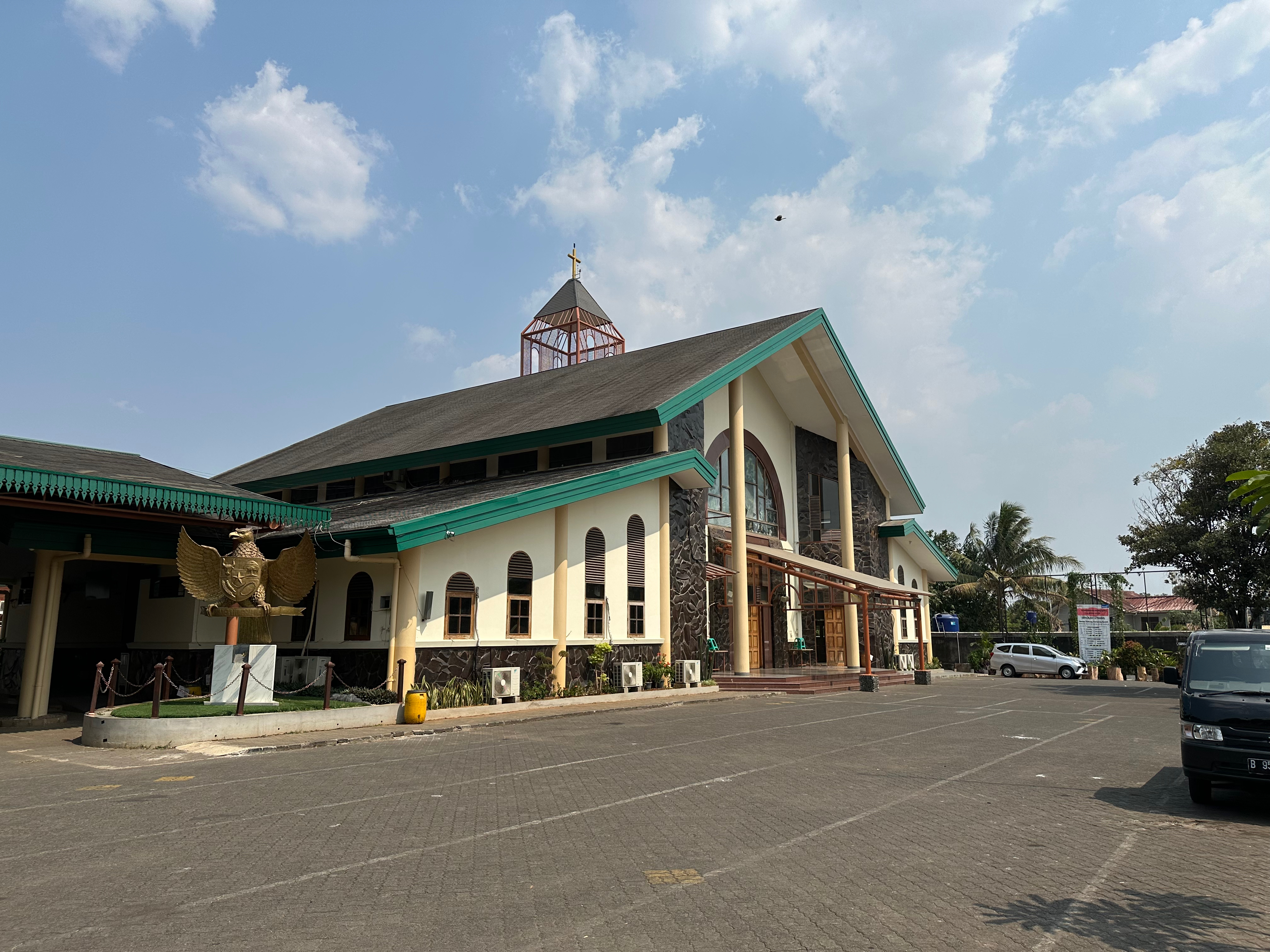
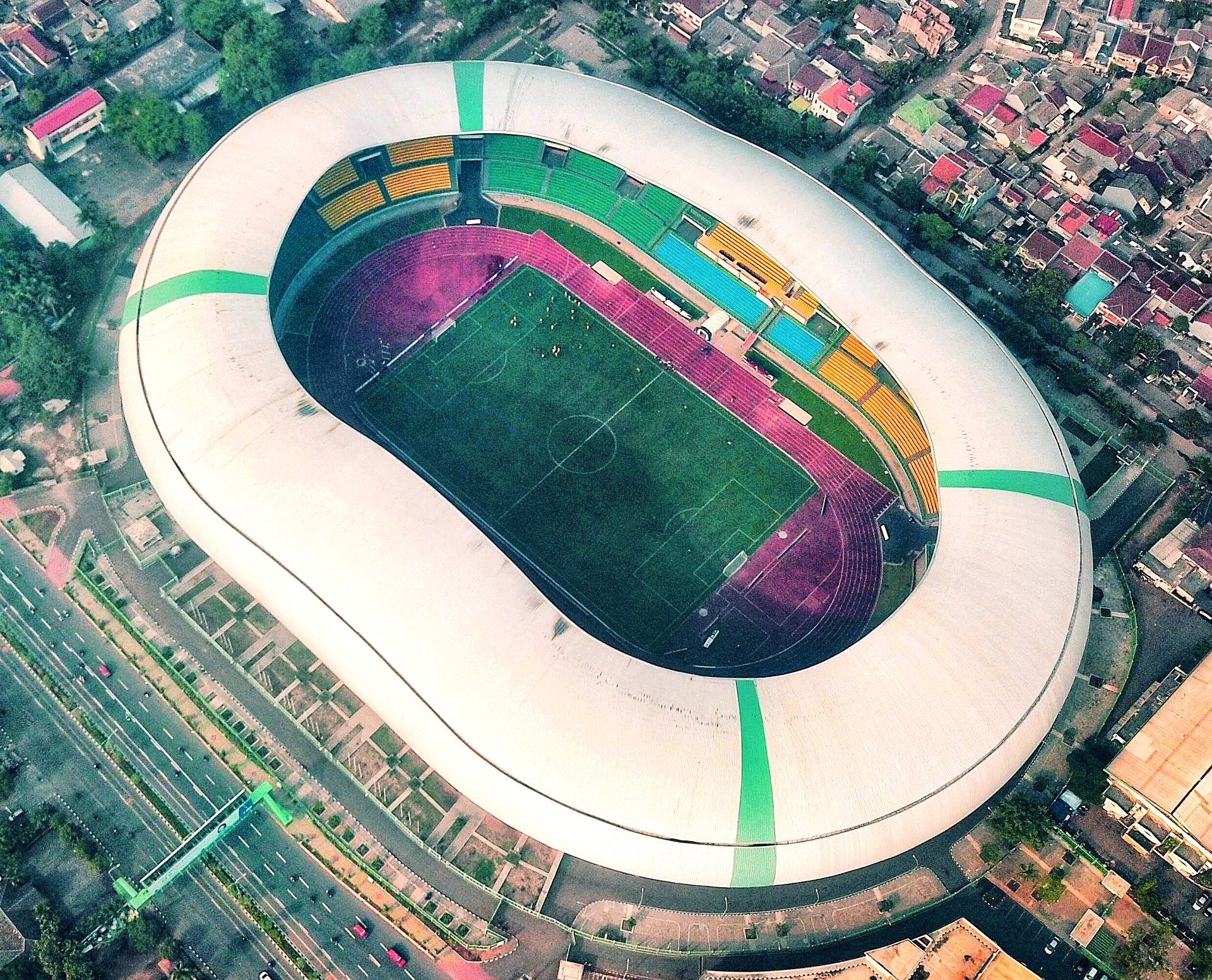
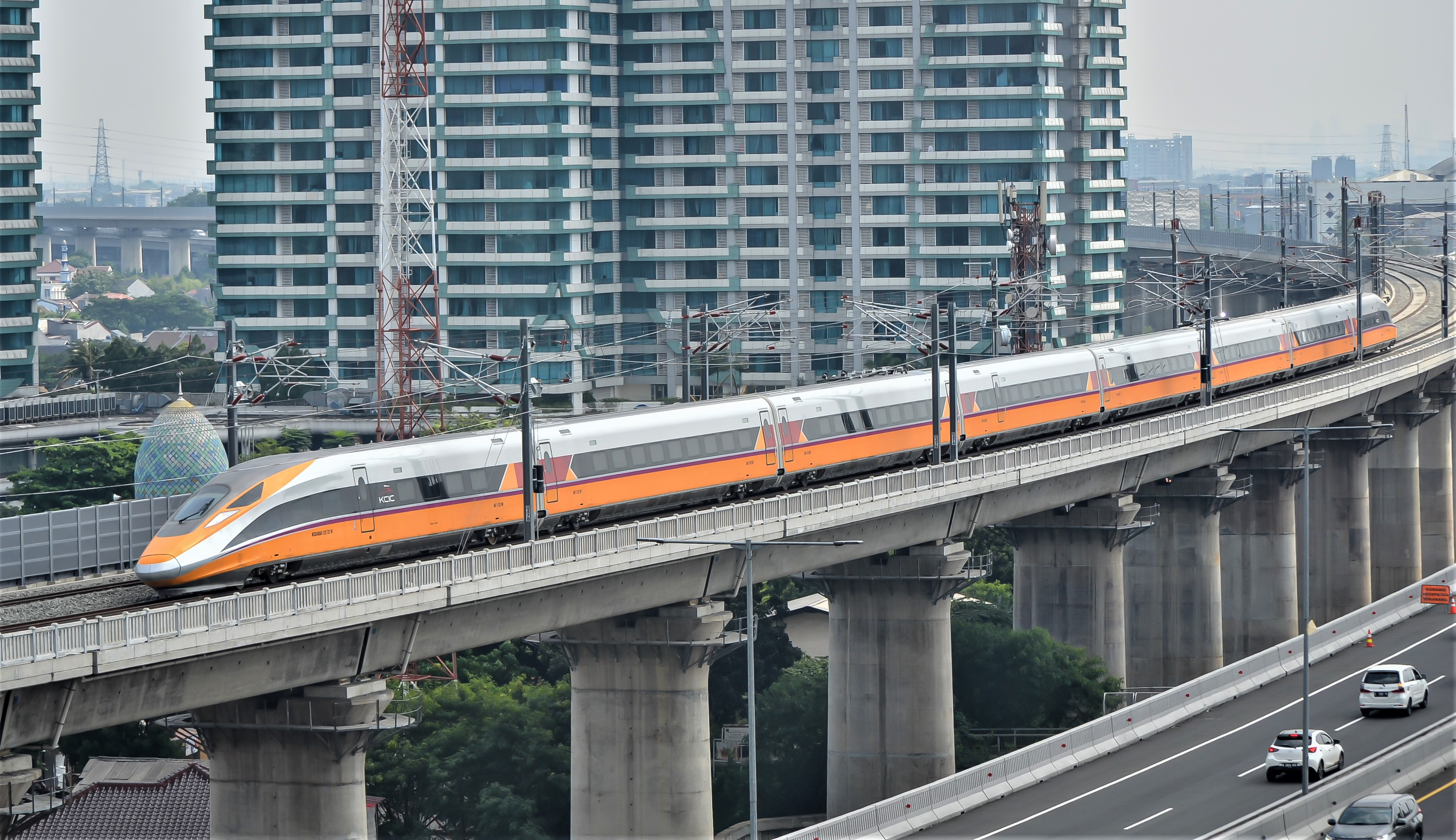
- View of Sheikh Mohammed bin Zayed Skyway and Bekasi Line Al-Barkah Mosque St. Servatius Church Patriot Stadium Whoosh passing through in MBZ Skyway

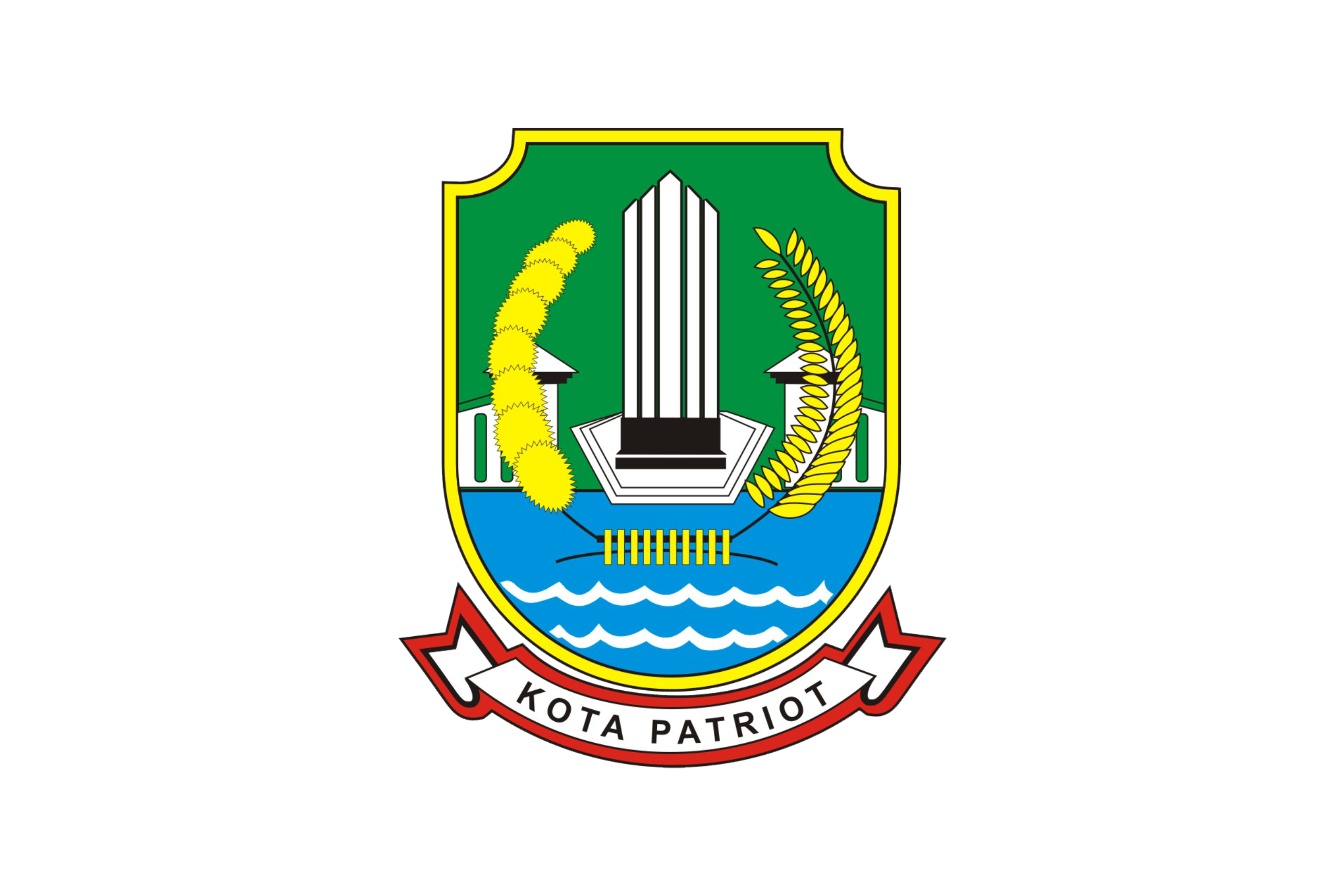
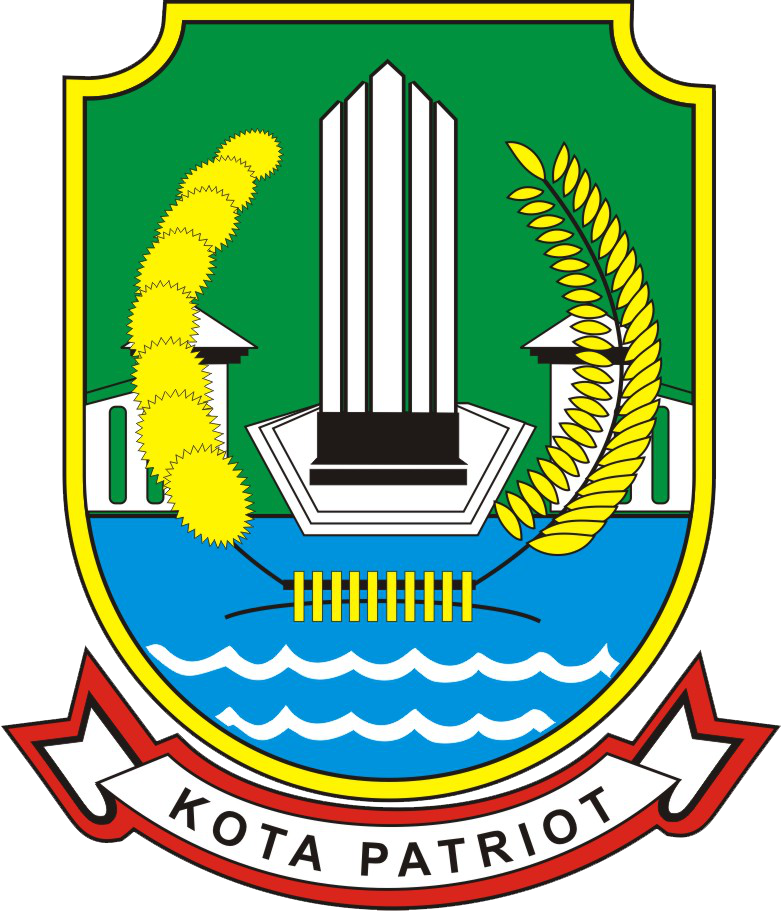
- Flag Coat of arms
- Nickname: Kota Patriot (City of the Patriots)
- Motto: Bekasi Maju, Sejahtera dan Ihsan (Bekasi for the Developed, Prosperous, and Good people)
- Location within West Java

- Location in Java Location in Indonesia
- Coordinates: 6°14′06″S 106°59′32″E
- Country: Indonesia
- Province: West Java
- Metropolitan area: Jabodetabek
- Founded (as Administrative City of Bekasi): 20 April 1982
- Incorporated (as kotamadya): 16 December 1996
- Inaugurated: 10 March 1997

Government
  - Mayor: Tri Adhianto Tjahyono
  - Vice Mayor: Abdul Harris Bobihoe

Area
  - Total: 213.12 km^{2} (82.29 sq mi)
- Elevation: 11–81 m (36–266 ft)

Population (mid 2025 official estimate)
  - Total: 2,648,272
  - Rank: 3rd
  - Density: 12,426/km^{2} (32,184/sq mi)
- Time zone: UTC+7 (Indonesia Western Time)
- Area code: (+62) 21
- Vehicle registration: B xxxx Kxx
- Website: bekasikota.go.id

Bekasi (Indonesian pronunciation: [bəˈkasi]) is the largest city in the province of West Java and the third-largest city in Indonesia. Located on the eastern border of Jakarta, it serves as a commuter city within the Jakarta metropolitan area. According to the 2020 Census by Statistics Indonesia (BPS), Bekasi had 2,543,676 inhabitants. The official estimate for mid 2025 was 2,648,272 (comprising 1,328,712 males and 1,319,560 females). The city is bordered by Bekasi Regency (from which the city was separated administratively on 16 December 1996) to the north and the east, Bogor Regency and Depok City to the south, and the city of East Jakarta to the west.

Bekasi is one of the oldest cities in Indonesia, and has a history of being the capital city of the Kingdom of Tarumanagara. At that time, the name of Bekasi was Dayeuh Sundasembawa or Jayagiri. The earliest evidence of its existence dates from the fifth century according to the Tugu inscription, which describes the name of two rivers that run through the city, i.e. Candrabhaga and Gomati and one of those rivers, i.e. Candrabhaga is the origin of the name Bekasi where the name Candrabhaga evolved into "Bhagasasi" – due to the Sanskrit word candra (which means moon) evolved into Old Sundanese word 'sasi' which also means moon – and then the name Bhagasasi was mis-spelt as "Bhagasi", and then the Dutch colonial government also mis-spelt the name Bhagasi as "Bacassie", and finally it became "Bekasi". During the Dutch East Indies period, Bekasi was a part of Batavia residency. As a dormitory city, many middle-upper class satellite areas have been developed in Bekasi, complete with their own shopping malls, schools, hospitals, club houses, water park, and shuttle bus services to central Jakarta. The large number of multinational companies has apparently attracted many expatriates (mainly Japanese and Korean) to settle in Bekasi.

== Economy ==
Bekasi has already grown to become one of the main centres of growth in Jabodetabek. The city accounts for 2.11% of total national GDP. Recently, many foreigners (mostly Korean, Japanese, and Chinese) have set up their business to take advantage of its dynamism and boost its economy. Bekasi's economy was mainly based on service and manufacturing. Some headquarters of big corporations are located here, such as PT Metropolitan Land Tbk and PT Kian Santang Muliatama Tbk.

=== Commerce ===
Bekasi is one of the most promising property markets in Jabodetabek, and several high-value developments have transformed its property market. Many of country's big property developers are building apartments, hotels, and shopping malls in the city. In recent years, some residences have developed along the Jatiwarna/Jatibening — East Bekasi toll highway, further to Cibatu in Bekasi Regency. These include Kota Harapan Indah, Summarecon Bekasi, Kemang Pratama and Grand Galaxy City.

Prime business and commercial centres are situated in the western part of city. There are some financial centres, restaurants, and shopping centres along Jalan Ahmad Yani, Bekasi CBD, Jalan Sudirman, Jalan K.H. Noer Alie, and Harapan Indah Boulevard.

The largest shopping centre is Grand Metropolitan with over 125,000 m^{2} (1,350,000 sq ft) of floor space. Other shopping centres include Metropolitan Mall, Pakuwon Mall Bekasi, Summarecon Mal Bekasi, Mal Ciputra Cibubur, Mega Bekasi Hypermall, Grand Galaxy Park, Grand Mall, Blu Plaza, BTC Mall, GP Mall, Bekasi Cyber Park, Plaza Pondok Gede, and Lagoon Avenue.

Many hotels developed in Bekasi, such as Santika, Fairfield by Marriott, Four Points by Sheraton, Tune Hotel, Horison, Harris, Aston Imperial, Amaris and Amaroossa.

== Infrastructure ==
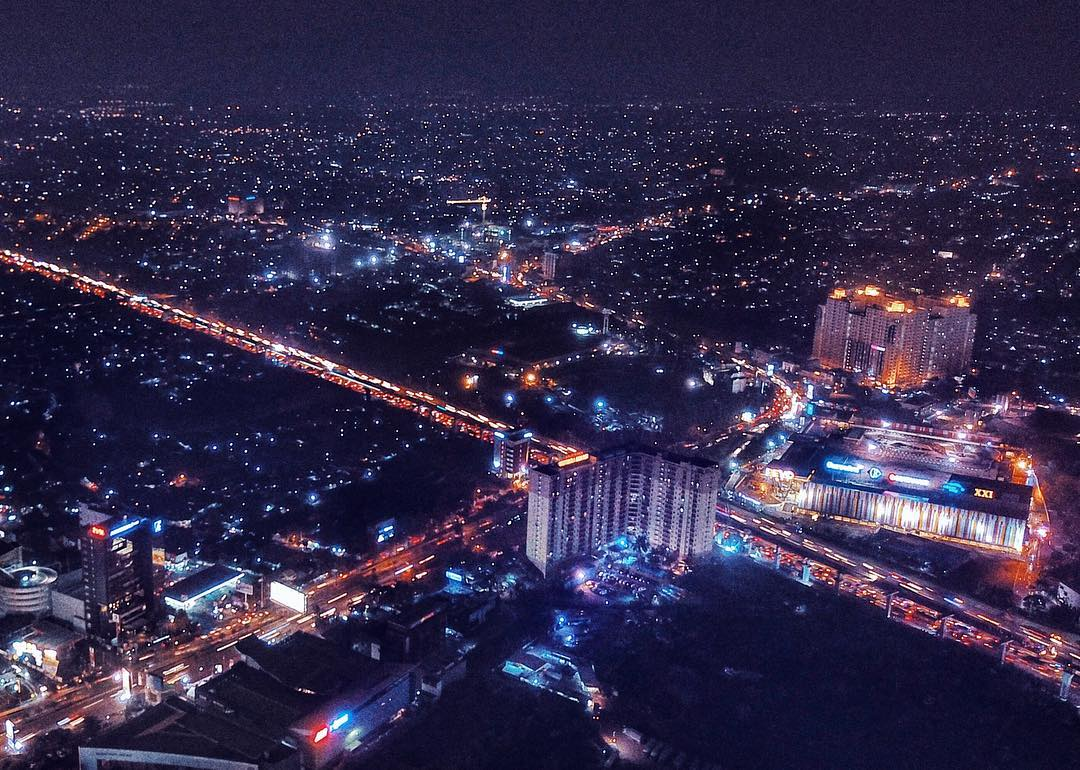
Bekasi commercial centers

The development of large scale residential areas and industrial parks in Bekasi has been induced by infrastructure development, especially roads, highways and railways.

=== Road and highway ===
Bekasi is connected by the Trans-Java Toll Road, the main road across Java. There are three expressways connections from the Jabodetabek urban area: the Jakarta–Cikampek Toll Road, which has three exits in Bekasi; the Jakarta Outer Ring Road, which provides access to Tangerang, Jakarta and Bogor; and the Bekasi-Cawang-Kampung Melayu Toll Road. In 2019, Jakarta-Cikampek elevated toll road will operate to ease traffic on the current toll road between Cikunir and West Karawang with a total length of 36.4 kilometres. Owing to its location as a satellite city of Jakarta, heavy rush hour traffic jams have become common on the roads between East Jakarta and Bekasi.

KM	Toll Road	Toll Gate	Destination	
04	Tol Bekasi - Karawang - Tambun	Pondok gede, Pondok bambu, Jaticempaka,		
08	Tol Bekasi - Karawang - Tambun	Jakarta–Cikampek Toll Road	Jatibening	Jatibening, Jatiwaringin, Cikunir
12	Tol Bekasi - Karawang - Tambun	Jakarta–Cikampek Toll Road	Bekasi Barat	Kayuringin, Pekayon, Summarecon Bekasi, Margajaya
16	Tol Bekasi - Karawang - Tambun	Jakarta–Cikampek Toll Road	Bekasi Timur	Margahayu, Bulak Kapal, Bantar Gebang
37	Tol Bekasi - Karawang - Tambun	Jakarta Outer Ring Road	Jatiwarna	Jatiwarna, Kranggan, Pondok Gede
41	Tol Bekasi - Karawang - Tambun	Jakarta Outer Ring Road	Jatiasih	Jatiasih, Cikunir, Jatimekar
47	Kalimalang	Jakarta Outer Ring Road	Kranji, Jakasampurna, Bintara Jaya	
49	Bintara	Jakarta Outer Ring Road	Bintara, Bintara Jaya, Harapan Baru	
13	Bekasi-Cawang-Kampung Melayu Toll Road	Jakasampurna	Jakasampurna, Jakasetia, Grand Galaxy City	

=== Railway ===
A double track railway connecting Manggarai to Cikarang serves the city. Beside a double track railway, the government also built a 17.9 km light rail transit line connecting East Bekasi-Cawang-Dukuh Atas across Greater Jakarta.

== Transport ==
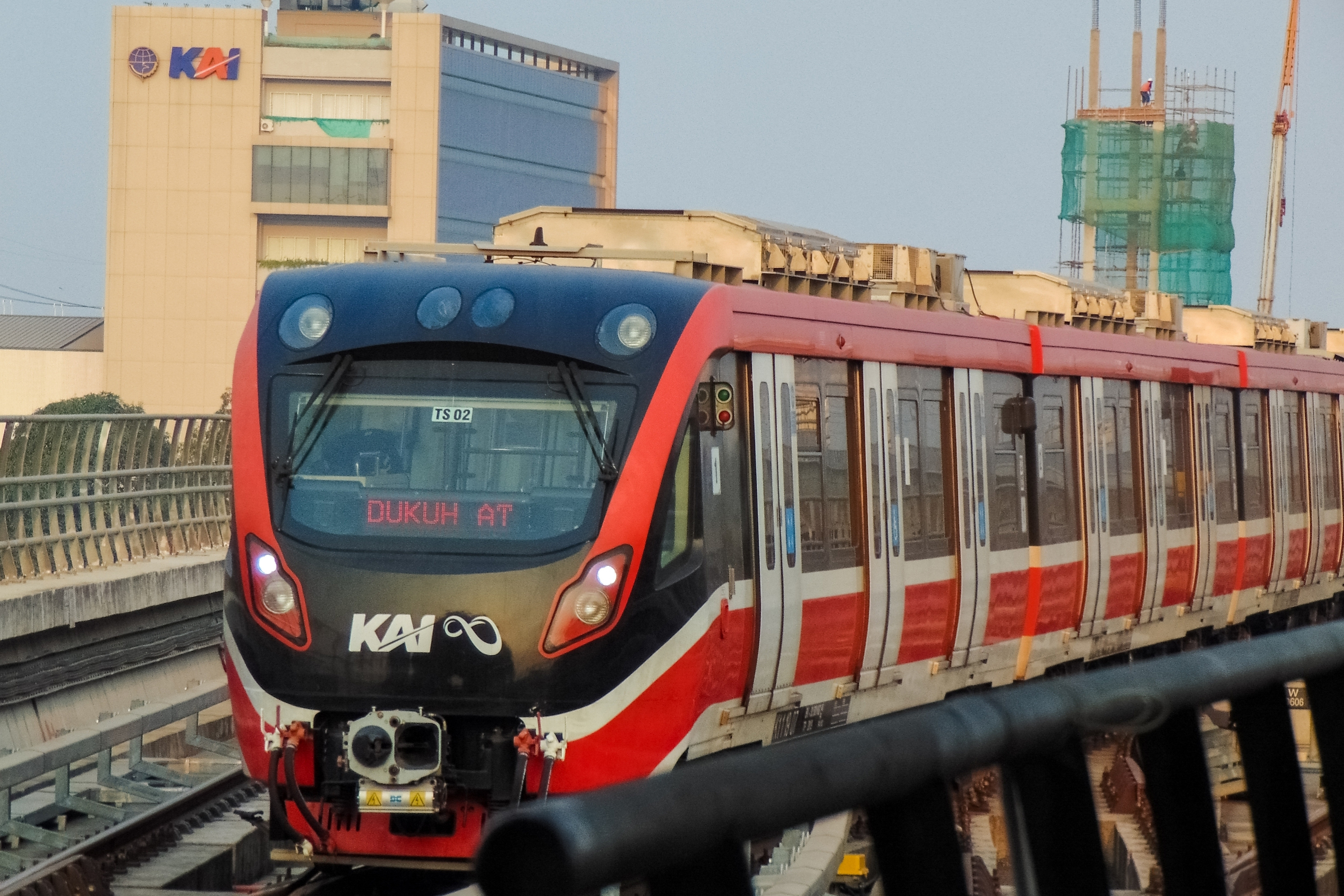
Jabodebek LRT arriving to Jati Mulya station, Bekasi

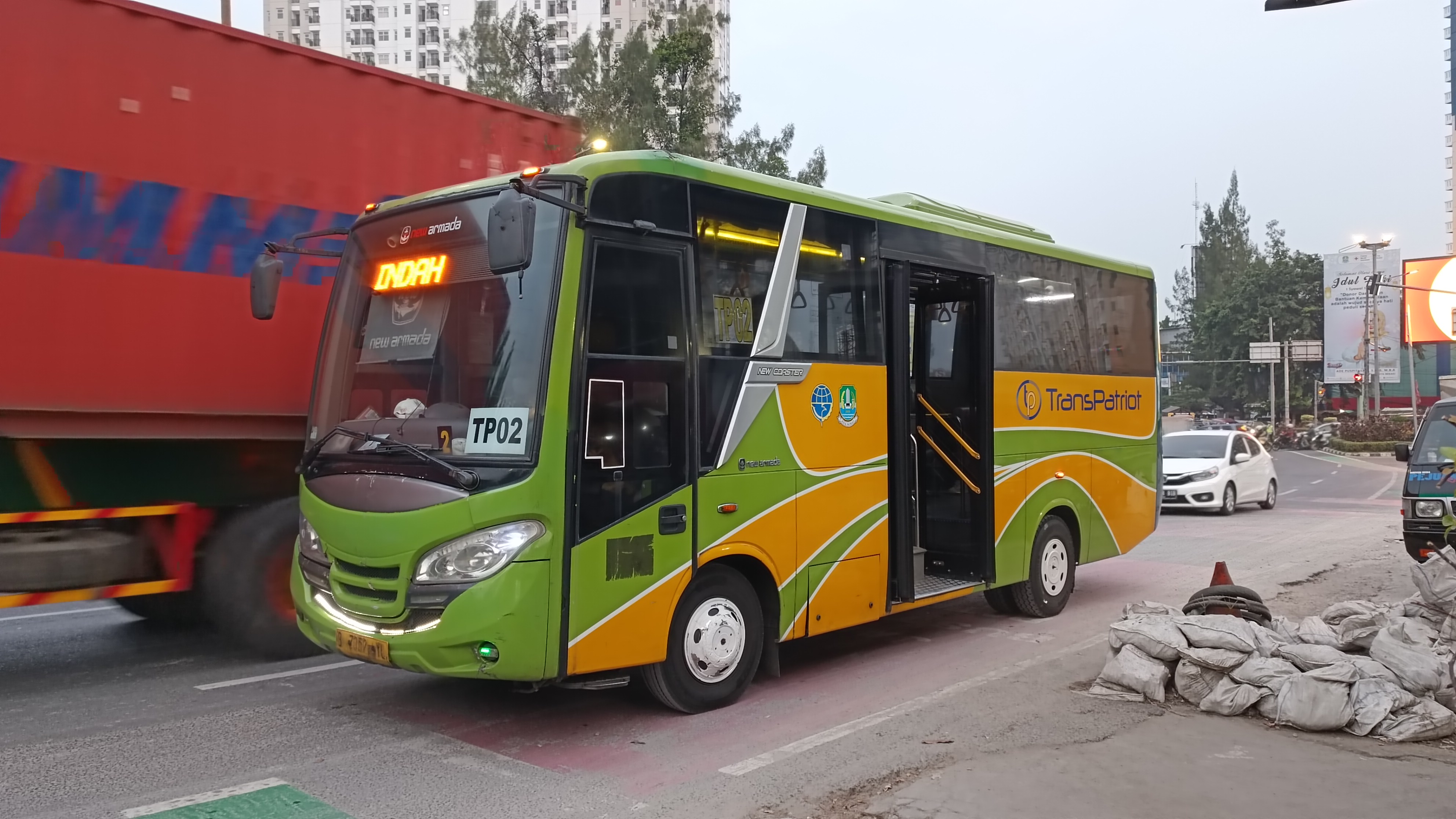
A TransPatriot fleet in Bekasi

At present, rapid transit in Bekasi across Greater Jakarta consists of rail KRL Commuterline, Jabodebek LRT, and a bus rapid transit TransJakarta.

KRL Commuterline's Blue Line serves from either Bekasi, Bekasi Timur or Kranji to Jakarta Kota (via Pasar Senen/Manggarai) and Cikarang. Bekasi Station also serves intercity trains to cities across Java.

Jabodebek LRT serving on Bekasi Line which serves trips from Dukuh Atas station to Jatimulya station. The distance traveled in this fully-elevated line is 29.54 km.

Transjakarta and the Transjabodetabek premium serves commuters from Harapan Indah, Summarecon Bekasi, Bulak Kapal, Vida Bekasi, and Jatiwarna, as well as the feeder buses from Kemang Pratama and Grand Galaxy City to Jakarta city center. The TransPatriot operates a route within the city. DAMRI shuttle bus service is available from the Soekarno–Hatta International Airport to Kayuringin, Harapan Indah and Summarecon Bekasi. Taxis are widely available. The primary means of public transportation is by minibus, called angkot. They serve certain routes throughout the city. The main bus terminal is Terminal Bekasi, located in East Bekasi. The other terminals are Pondok Gede, Harapan Indah and Kayuringin.

Halim Perdanakusuma International Airport and Halim high-speed train station are located on the border of Bekasi and East Jakarta.

== Hydrology ==
The City of Bekasi is traversed by the main river, the Kali Bekasi (Bekasi River), along with its tributaries. The Bekasi River originates from the confluence of the Cikeas and Cileungsi rivers, which have their sources in the mountains of Bogor Regency. Surface water in the Bekasi area includes the Bekasi River, several smaller rivers, and the Tarum Barat irrigation canals used for irrigating fields. This water serves as the raw water source for the drinking water needs of the Bekasi region (both the city and the regency) and the DKI Jakarta area. Currently, the surface water condition of the Bekasi River is polluted by industrial waste originating from the southern part of the City of Bekasi (industries located in Bogor Regency).

The City of Bekasi is a part of the Bekasi river basin, located in the downstream area of the basin with slopes ranging from 0 to 2% and elevations between 11 meters to 81 meters above sea level. This topographical condition leads to frequent flooding in many areas of Bekasi, especially during rainy seasons, such as in the districts of Jatiasih, East Bekasi, Rawalumbu, South Bekasi, Pondok Gede, and Pondok Melati.

== Demographics ==
The 2020 Census of Bekasi's population was 2,543,676, but according to the official estimates for mid 2025 the total had become 2,648,272, an increase of over 100,000. Bekasi is inhabited by many different ethnic groups, mostly Betawi, Sundanese, and Javanese descent. Sundanese are the largest minority as well as other minorities include Minangkabau, Bataks, and Chinese.

The regional language used by the majority of the population is the Betawi Ora dialect. Then at the southern end, Sundanese language (Bekasi dialect) is also spoken, precisely in districts of Jatisampurna and Bantargebang.

Most citizens in Bekasi adhere to Islam. Other religions include Christianity (Roman Catholicism and Protestantism), Hinduism, Buddhism, and Confucianism.

== Sport ==
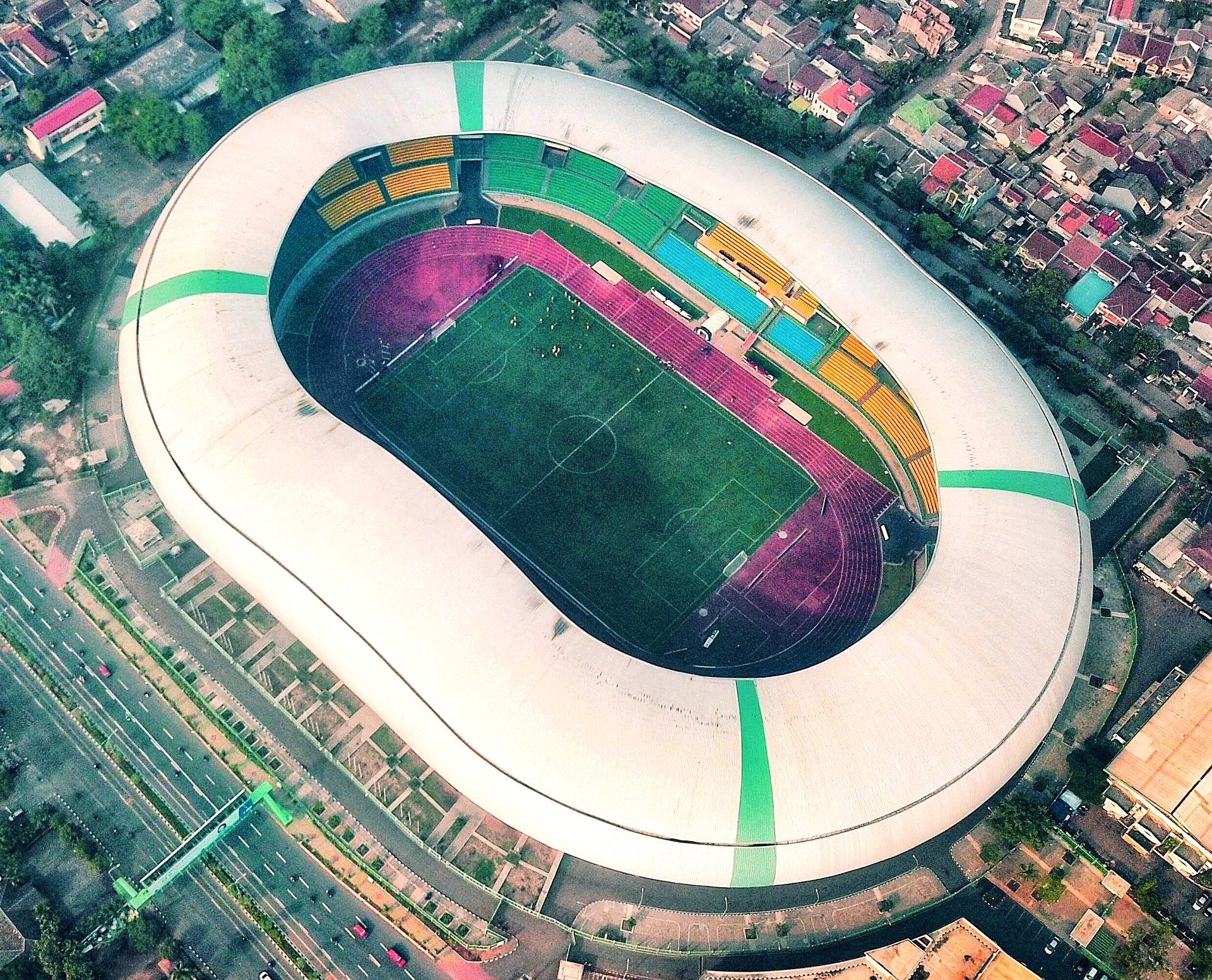
Patriot Chandrabhaga Stadium

Bekasi was the home base of the football team Persipasi Kota Bekasi, and Bekasi City with Patriot Chandrabhaga Stadium as the home stadium of the two clubs.

== Administrative districts ==
Bekasi City is divided into twelve districts (kecamatan), listed below with their areas and their populations at the 2010 Census and the 2020 Census, together with the official estimates for mid 2025. The table also includes the locations of the district administrative centres, the number of urban villages (all classed as kelurahan) within each district, and its postal codes.

Regional Codes	Name of District (kecamatan)	Area in km^{2}	Pop'n 2010 Census	Pop'n 2020 Census	Pop'n mid 2025 Estimate	Admin centre	No. of kelurahan	Post codes
32.75.08	Pondok Gede	17.43	246,503	251,195	252,528	Jatiwaringin	5	17411 – 17413
32.75.10	Jatisampurna	20.19	103,715	123,924	134,556	Jatisampurna	5	17432 – 17435
32.75.12	Pondok Melati	11.02	128,934	131,122	131,689	Jatirahayu	4	17414, 17415, 17431
32.75.09	Jatiasih	24.26	198,444	247,362	274,140	Jatiasih	6	17421 – 17426
32.75.07	Bantargebang	19.24	95,845	107,216	112,760	Bantargebang	4	17151 – 17154
32.75.11	Mustikajaya	24.76	159,773	213,515	244,735	Mustikajaya	4	17155 – 17158
32.75.01	Bekasi Timur (East Bekasi)	14.64	247,357	257,025	260,837	Bekasijaya	4	17111 – 17113
32.75.05	Rawalumbu	16.85	208,334	220,699	226,075	Bojong Rawalumbu	4	17114 – 17117
32.75.04	Bekasi Selatan (South Bekasi)	15.81	203,654	210,805	213,535	Pekayonjaya	5	17141 – 17148
32.75.02	Bekasi Barat (West Bekasi)	14.90	272,557	281,681	285,110	Bintara	5	17133 – 17145
32.75.06	Medansatria	13.21	161,162	162,119	161,962	Medansatria	4	17131 – 17133, 17143
32.75.03	Bekasi Utara (North Bekasi)	20.81	308,593	337,013	350,345	Perwira	6	17121 – 17125, 17142
	Totals	213.12	2,334,871	2,543,676	2,648,272		56	

== Government ==
=== Mayor ===
The Mayor of Bekasi is the highest-ranking official within the Bekasi City government. He reports to the Governor of West Java. The current mayor or regional head of Bekasi City is Tri Adhianto Tjahyono, with Abdul Harris Bobihoe as vice mayor. They took office on 20 February 2025.

== Climate ==
Situated in the alluvial lowland, Bekasi City has a tropical monsoon climate (Köppen: Am). The wettest month (highest rainfall) is January, with a rainfall total of 374 millimetres or 14.7 inches, while the driest month (lowest rainfall) is August, with a rainfall total of 55 millimetres or 2.2 inches.

Climate data for Bekasi
Month	Jan	Feb	Mar	Apr	May	Jun	Jul	Aug	Sep	Oct	Nov	Dec	Year
Mean daily maximum °C (°F)	29.8 (85.6)	30.1 (86.2)	30.9 (87.6)	31.7 (89.1)	32.0 (89.6)	32.0 (89.6)	32.0 (89.6)	32.5 (90.5)	32.9 (91.2)	33.0 (91.4)	32.1 (89.8)	31.0 (87.8)	31.7 (89.0)
Daily mean °C (°F)	26.2 (79.2)	26.4 (79.5)	26.9 (80.4)	27.5 (81.5)	27.4 (81.3)	27.0 (80.6)	26.8 (80.2)	27.3 (81.1)	27.6 (81.7)	27.9 (82.2)	27.9 (82.2)	26.9 (80.4)	27.4 (81.3)
Mean daily minimum °C (°F)	22.6 (72.7)	22.7 (72.9)	22.7 (72.9)	23.0 (73.4)	22.9 (73.2)	22.1 (71.8)	21.7 (71.1)	21.8 (71.2)	22.1 (71.8)	22.6 (72.7)	22.9 (73.2)	22.8 (73.0)	22.5 (72.5)
Average rainfall mm (inches)	374 (14.7)	282 (11.1)	219 (8.6)	152 (6.0)	129 (5.1)	88 (3.5)	65 (2.6)	55 (2.2)	65 (2.6)	115 (4.5)	155 (6.1)	216 (8.5)	1,915 (75.5)
Source: Climate-Data.org

== In popular culture ==
- Chairil Anwar's poem Karawang-Bekasi (1948).
- Pramoedya Ananta Toer's novel Di Tepi Kali Bekasi (1951) is set mainly in Bekasi.
- "Bekasi Swag" song by Young Lex (ft. Doms Dee; 2015).

== People from Bekasi ==
Notable people from Bekasi include:

- Adixi Lenzivio: football player
- Luitenant der Chinezen Khouw Tian Sek: landlord, patriarch of the Khouw family of Tamboen
- Shella Devi Aulia: badminton player
- S. K. Trimurti: government minister, Independence activist, writer and journalist
- Tutty Alawiyah: government minister and women's rights advocate
- Gloria Emanuelle Widjaja: badminton player
- Rinov Rivaldy: badminton player
- Zanadin Fariz: football player
- Arapenta Poerba: football player
- Althaf Indie: football player
- Syahwal Ginting: football player
- Zahaby Gholy: football player

== Sister cities/towns ==
- Mukim Mentiri, Brunei-Muara, Brunei Darussalam
- Petaling Jaya, Selangor, Malaysia
