= Pondok Gede, Bekasi =

Coordinates: 6°15′20″S 106°58′07″E

Pondok Gede
- District
- Location in Bekasi, Java and Indonesia Pondok Gede (Java) Pondok Gede (Indonesia)
- Country: Indonesia
- Province: West Java
- City: Bekasi

Area
  - Total: 17.43 km^{2} (6.73 sq mi)
- Elevation: 38 m (125 ft)

Population (mid 2023 estimate)
  - Total: 227,423
  - Density: 13,050/km^{2} (33,790/sq mi)
- Time zone: UTC+7 (IWST)
- Area code: (+62) 21
- Vehicle registration: B
- Villages: 5
- Website: kec-pondok%20gede.bekasikota.go.id

Pondok Gede or Pondokgede is one of the twelve administrative districts (kecamatan) within the city municipality of Bekasi, in Jabodetabek (Jakarta's metropolitan area) on the island of Java, Indonesia. The district covers an area of 1,743 hectares (4,307 acres), and had a population of 246,503 at the 2010 Census and 251,195 at the 2020 Census; the official estimate as at mid 2023 was 227,423 - comprising 117,443 males and 113,980 females.

The administrative centre is located in Jati Waringin, and the district is sub-divided into five urban "villages" or communities (kelurahan), as listed below with their areas and their populations as at mid-2023, together with their postcodes.

Kode Wilayah	Name of kelurahan	Area in km^{2}	Population mid 2023 estimate	Post code
32.75.08.1001	Jati Waringin	2.90	47,306	17411
32.75.08.1002	Jati Bening	3.18	37,309	17412
32.75.08.1003	Jati Makmur	4.32	60,431	17413
32.75.08.1006	Jati Bening Baru	3.41	37,863	17412
32.75.08.1007	Jati Cempaka	3.62	44,514	17411
32.75.08	Totals	17.43	227,423	
