= Metropolitan Mall =

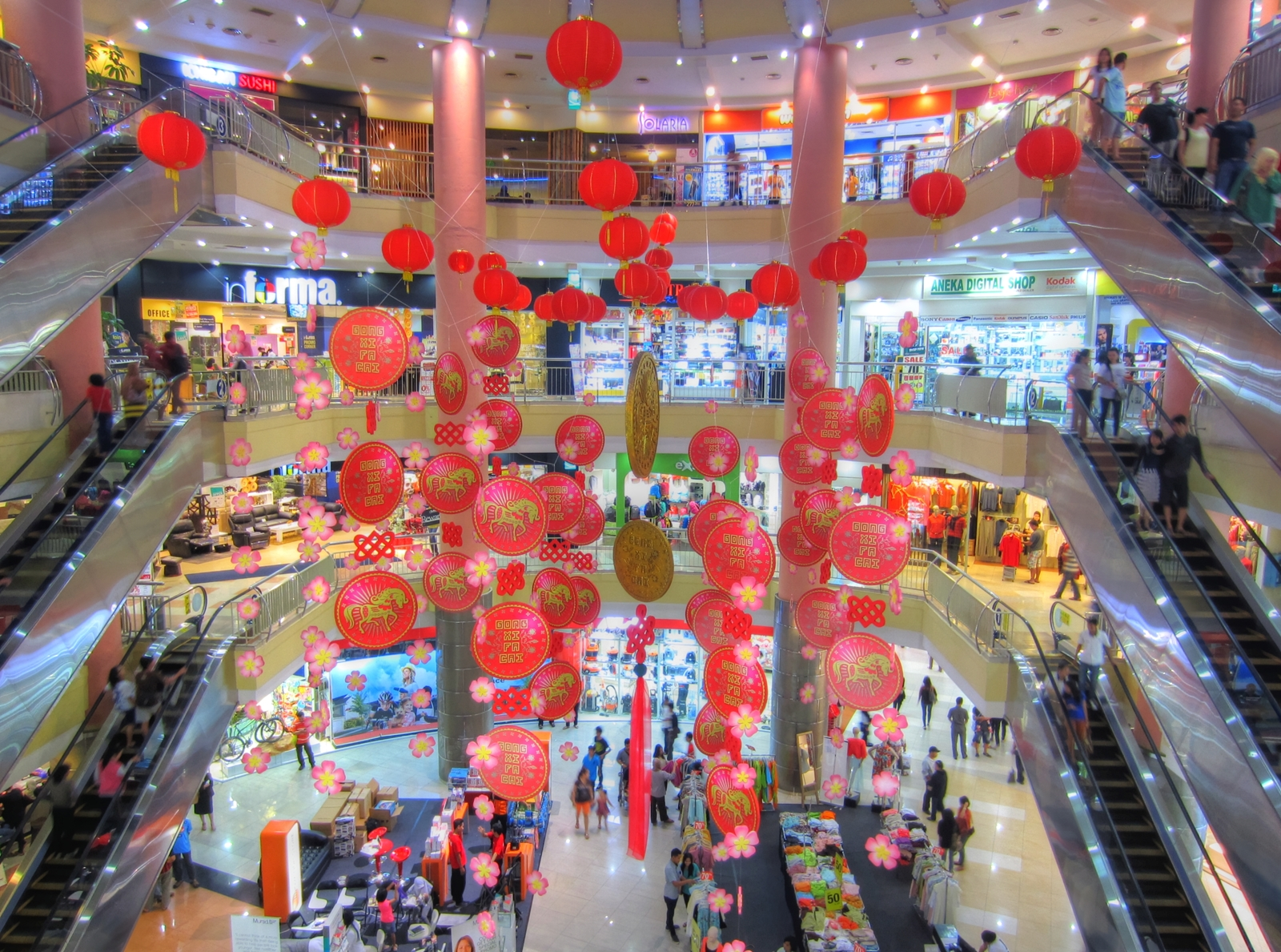
- Location: Bekasi, Indonesia
- Opened: 13 December 1993; 32 years ago
- Developer: PT Metropolitan Development
- Num. of stores: 225
- Floor area: 85,500 m^{2} (920,000 sq ft)
- Floors: 4 (retail)
- Website: malmetropolitan.com

Metropolitan Mall is a shopping and entertainment center in Bekasi, Indonesia. It was opened in 1993 and has over 85,500 m^{2} (920,000 sq ft) of floor space with 225 stores. It comprises two buildings, the Metropolitan Mall 1 and 2. Mall 2 opened in 2005.
