= Jakarta metropolitan area =

Largest metropolitan area of Indonesia

Jakarta metropolitan area Jabodetabek or Jabodetabekpunjur
- Megacity and megalopolis
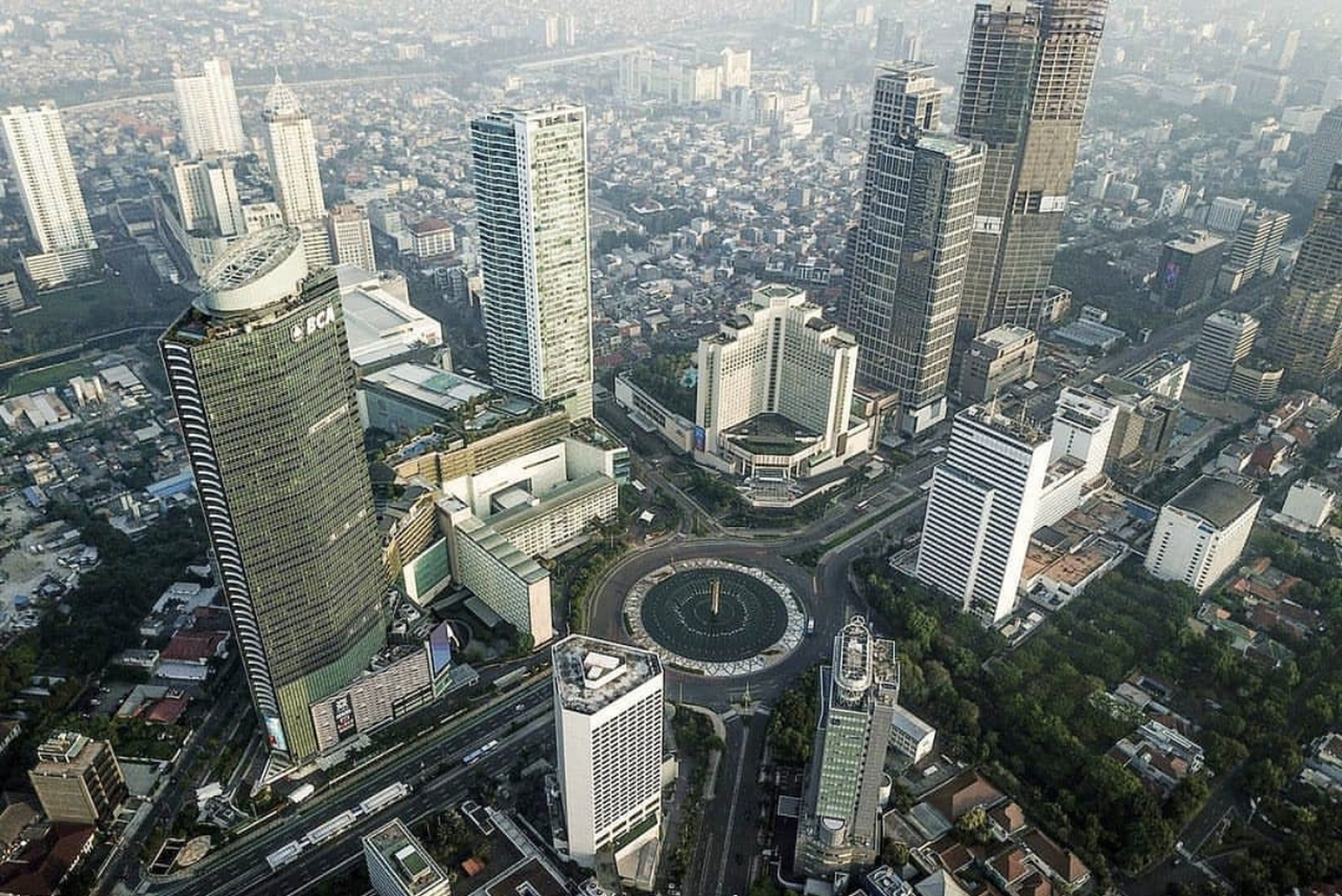
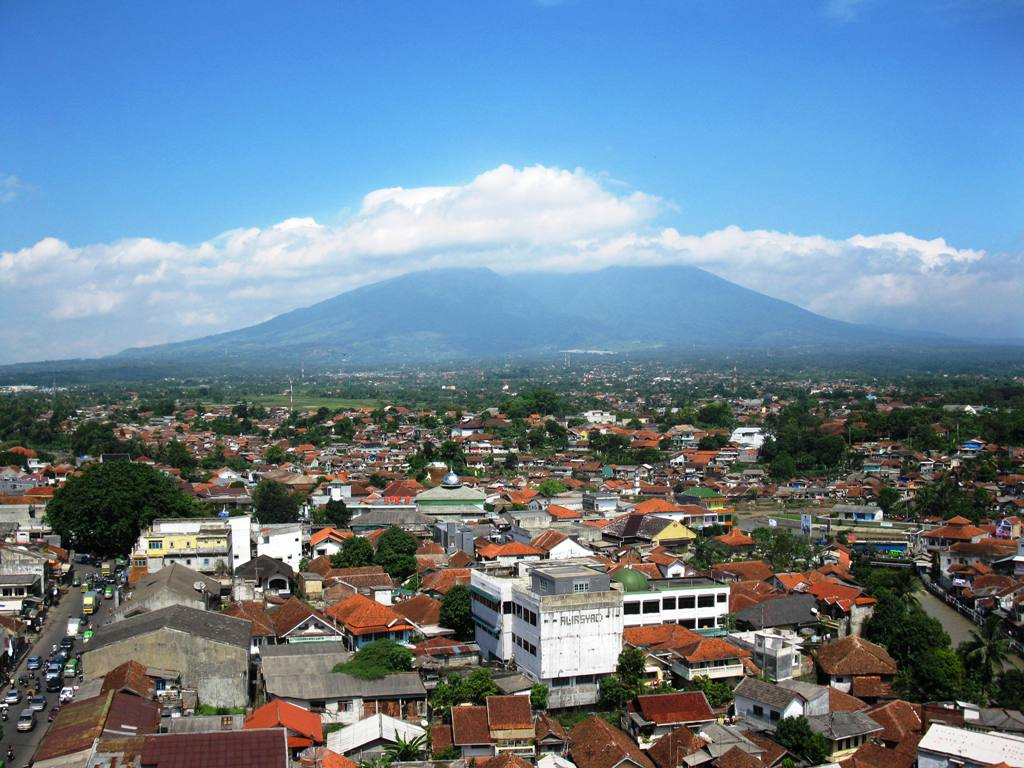
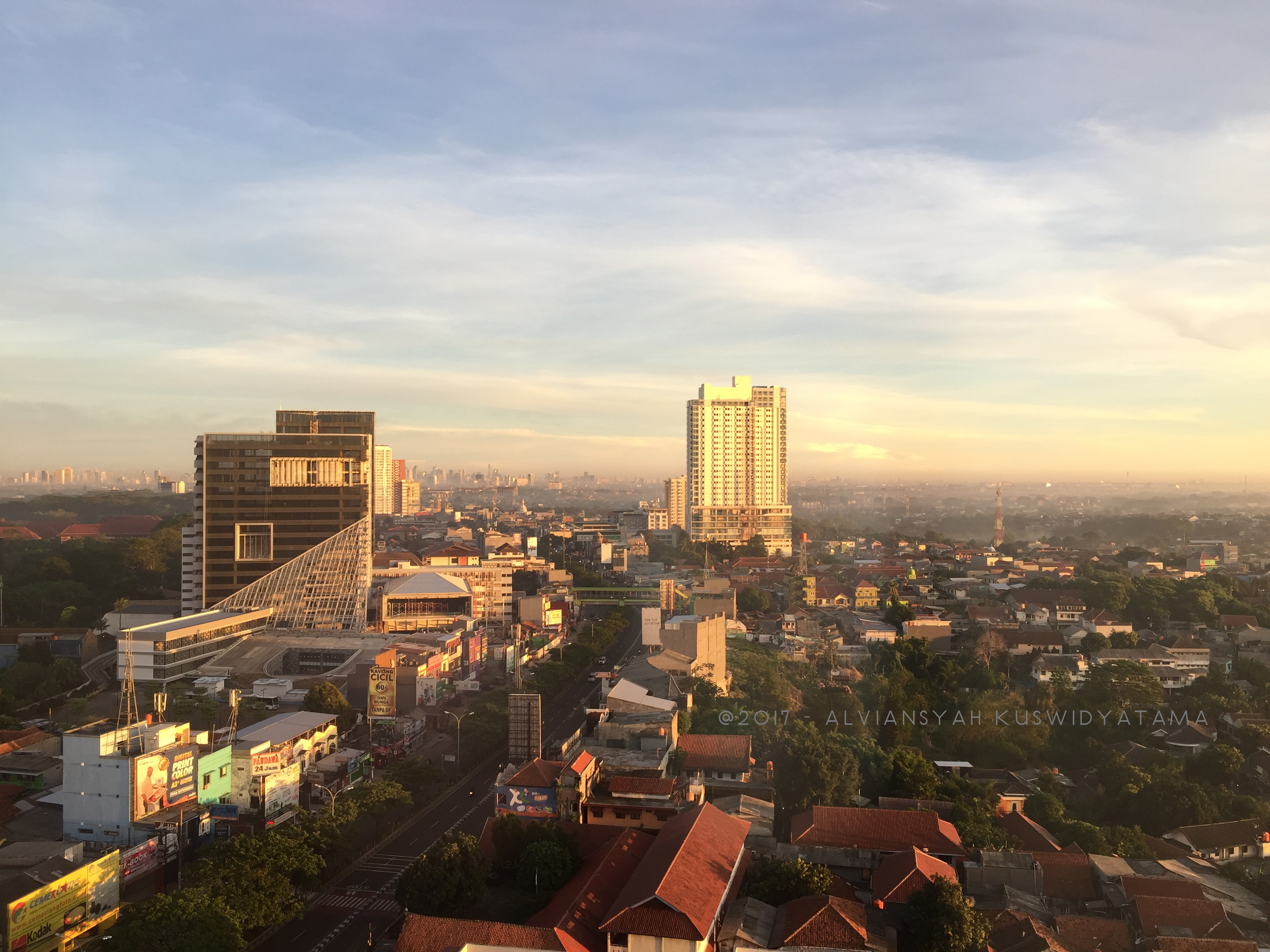
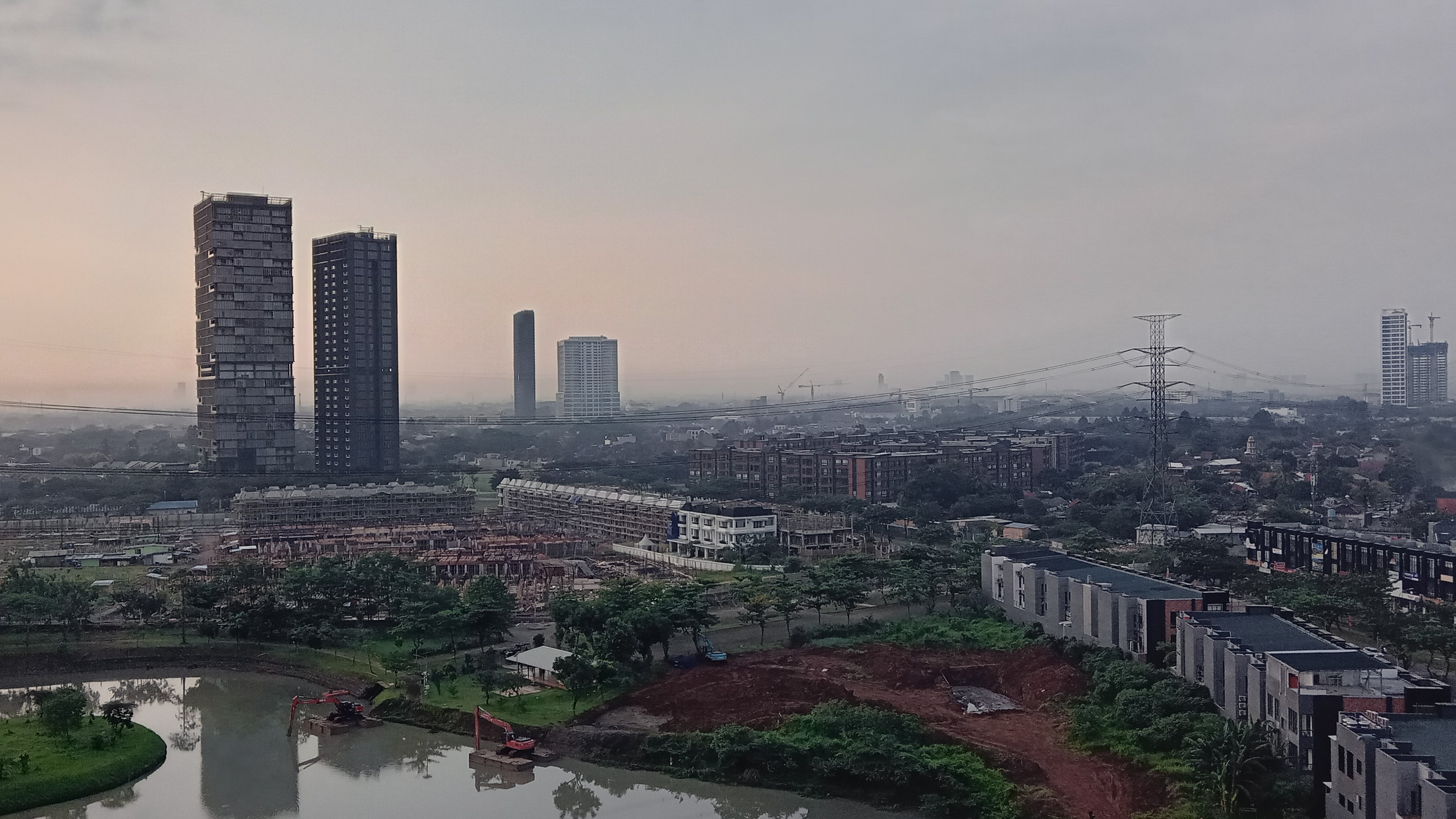
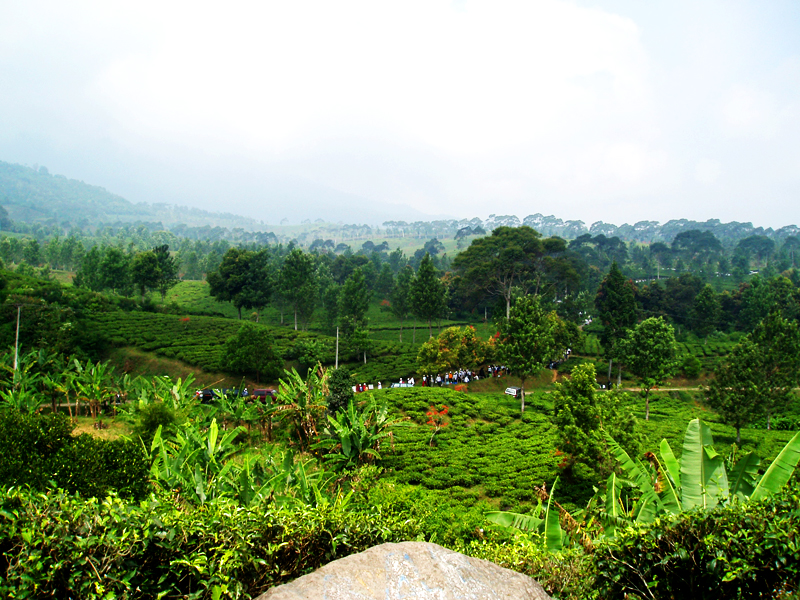
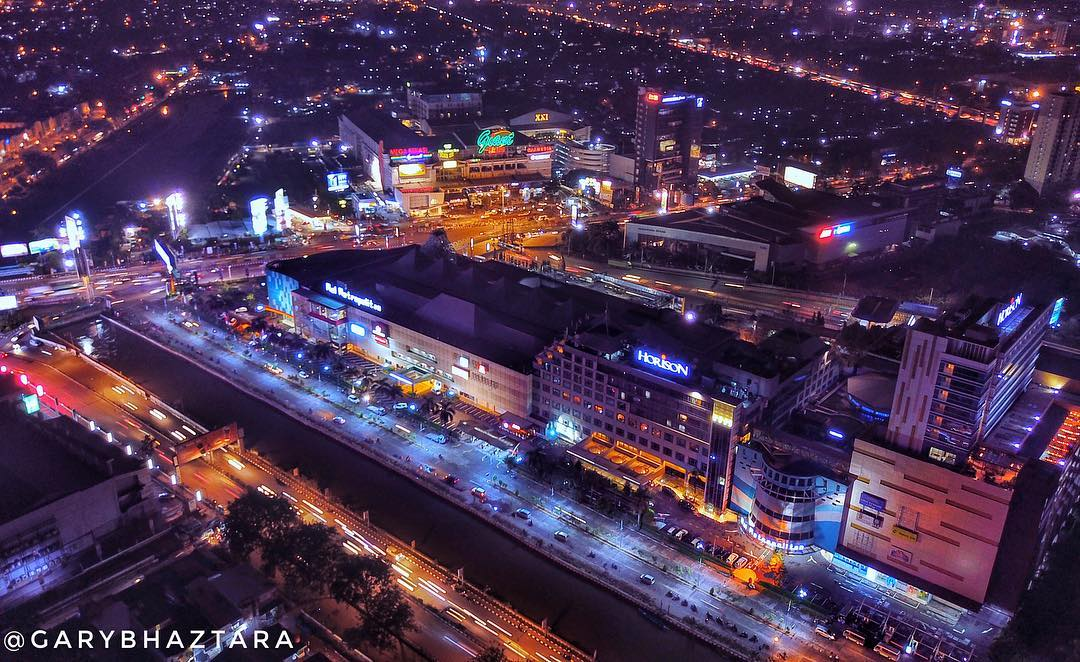
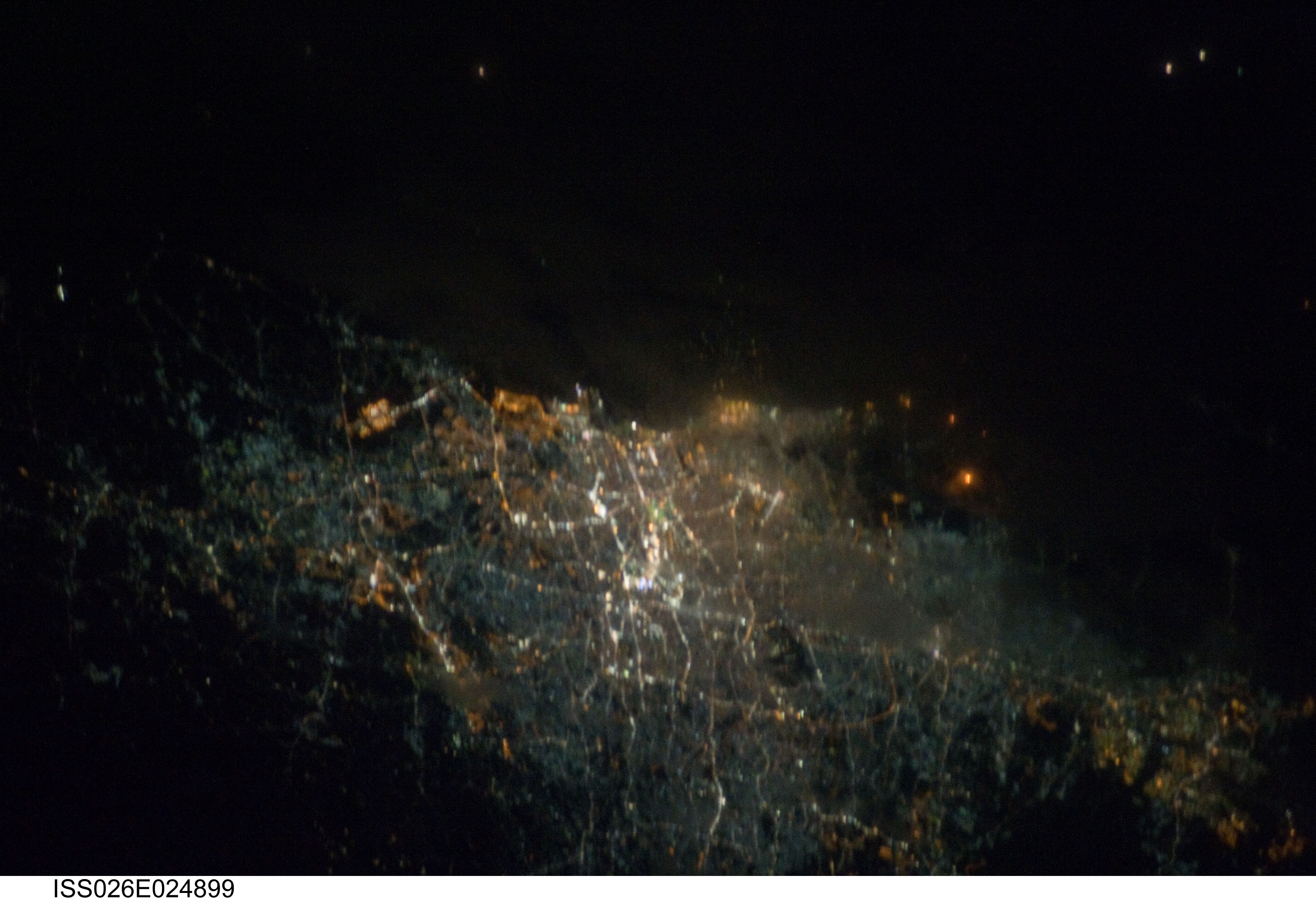
- From top, left to right: Aerial view of Bundaran HI in Jakarta, Bogor city and Mount Salak, Depok skyline, Alam Sutera CBD in South Tangerang, Aerial view of Puncak, Bekasi skyline at night and Landsat satellite view of Greater Jakarta during night.

- Coordinates: 6°10′30″S 106°49′43″E
- Country: Indonesia
- Provinces: Banten; Jakarta; West Java
- Core City: Jakarta
- Satellite Cities: Bogor; Depok; Tangerang City; South Tangerang; Bekasi
- Regencies: Bogor Regency; Tangerang Regency; Bekasi Regency part of Cianjur Regency

Area
  - Metro: 6,822.03 km^{2} (2,634.00 sq mi)

Population (late 2025 estimate)
  - Rank: 1st
  - Urban: 41,921,340
  - Metro: 32,257,654
  - Metro density: 4,728.45/km^{2} (12,246.6/sq mi)

GDP Megacity
  - GDP (Note: Including Cilegon–Serang–Sukabumi–Cianjur–Karawang-Purwakarta–Bandung): IDR 6,404,701 trillion (2023)
  - Nominal: US$420.192 billion (2023)
  - PPP: US$1.346 trillion (2023)
- Time zone: UTC+7 (Indonesia Western Time)
- Postcodes: 1xxxx
- Area codes: (62)21, (62)251, (62)263
- Vehicle sign: A, B, F
- GDP metro: 2023
- Total: ▲Rp 5,164,649 trillion ▲US$ 338.836 billion ▲US$ 1.085 trillion (PPP)
- Per capita: ▲Rp 149.221 million ▲US$ 9,789 ▲US$ 31,353 (PPP)
- Highest elevation 3,019 m (9,905 ft) 9,905 ft (Mount Pangrango, in Bogor Regency)

The Jakarta metropolitan area or Greater Jakarta, known locally as Jabodetabek (a syllabic abbreviation of Jakarta–Bogor–Depok–Tangerang–Bekasi), is the most populous megapolitan area in Indonesia. It includes the national capital (the Jakarta Special Capital Region, as the core city) as well as five satellite cities and three complete regencies.

The area comprises the Special Capital Region of Jakarta and parts of West Java and Banten provinces, specifically Bekasi Regency and Bogor Regency in West Java, and Tangerang Regency in Banten. The area also includes the independent cities of Bogor, Depok, Bekasi, Tangerang and South Tangerang, all of which are not included administratively in the regencies.

The population of the Jakarta metropolitan area, with an area of 6,822.03 km^{2} (2,634.00 sq mi), was 31.24 million according to the Indonesian 2020 Census, making it the most populous region in Indonesia, as well as the most populous urban area in the world. The Jakarta metropolitan area's share of the national population increased from 6.1% in 1961 to 11.26% in 2010. The population grew further to 32.3 million according to official estimates in mid-2024.

The region is the centre of government, culture, education, and economy of Indonesia. It has pulled many people from throughout Indonesia to come, live and work. Its economic power makes Jakarta metropolitan area the country's premier centre for finance, manufacturing and commerce. According to 2019 data, the area had a gross domestic product of US$297.7 billion with a per capita GDP of $8,775, and a purchasing power parity of $978.5 billion with a per capita PPP of $28,840, equal to 26.2% of the Indonesian economy.

== History ==
The term Jabodetabek or Greater Jakarta refers to the urban region surrounding Jakarta. Each city has its own mayor and they work under three different governors; Governor of DKI Jakarta, Governor of Banten (for Tangerang and South Tangerang), and Governor of West Java (for Bekasi, Depok, Bogor).

The region was established in 1976 through Presidential Instruction No. 13 in response to the needs to sustain the growing population of the capital city. Indonesia's government established the Jabotabek Cooperation Body (Badan Kerjasama Pembangunan) of the joint secretariat of Government of DKI Jakarta and West Java province.

The original term "Jabotabek" dated from the late 1970s and was revised to "Jabodetabek" in 1999 when "De" (for "Depok") was inserted into the name following its formation.

Another less commonly known acronym for this region is Jabodetabekpunjur, which includes the Puncak region of Bogor Regency and portions of Cianjur Regency. The term "Jabodetabekjur" or "Jabodetabekpunjur" was legalised on the Presidential Regulation Number 54 of 2008, and then the name "Jabodetabekpunjur" became officially used.

== Demographics ==
Population density of Java and Madura by subdistrict as of 2022, with major urban areas shown

Among the inhabitants, approximately 10.68 million lived in Jakarta Special Capital Region according to the mid-2024 official estimates; about 9.24 million in the five cities of Bogor, Depok, Bekasi, Tangerang and South Tangerang; and about 12.33 million in the three regencies (Bekasi Regency, Bogor Regency, and Tangerang Regency). The proportion of the core city's (Jakarta) population to that of the entire metropolitan area also declined significantly. In mid-2024, the population of Jakarta was only 33.1% of the total population of the Jakarta metropolitan area, continuing the decline from 54.6% in 1990 to 43.2% in 2000 and 35.5% in 2010. Furthermore, there has been a shift of arrival-destination for incoming migrants from Jakarta to other cities in the Jakarta metropolitan area. Today, about 20% of Indonesia's urban population is concentrated in the Jakarta metropolitan area.

Administrative division	Province	Area (km^{2})	Population (mid 2024)	Density per km^{2} (2024)
Jakarta	Special Region of Jakarta	660.98	10,684,946	16,165
Bekasi City	West Java	213.12	2,644,058	12,406
Depok City	West Java	199.91	2,163,635	10,823
Tangerang City	Banten	178.35	1,927,815	10,809
South Tangerang City	Banten	164.86	1,429,529	8,671
Central urban districts		1,417.22	18,849,983	13,301
Bekasi Regency	West Java	1,273.88	3,273,868	2,570
Bogor City	West Java	111.39	1,078,351	9,681
Bogor Regency	West Java	2,991.78	5,682,303	1,899
Tangerang Regency	Banten	1,027.76	3,373,149	3,282
Suburban districts		5,404.81	13,407,671	2,419
Jabodetabek		6,822.03	32,257,654	4,728

Sources:

- Census final 2010; Census final 2020; and official estimate as at mid 2024. / Badan Pusat Statistik - Indonesia.
- Indonesia: Table of all administrative divisions/ Citypopulation.de
- Kemendagri 2022 June. Note that the pandemic had a skewing effects on Census 2020 data compared with prior year estimates, in favour of satellite cities, while post-pandemic data indicated a flood back into central cities, but by 2024 this effect was reversed. This effect was repeated for Bandung, Surabaya, Palembang, and Medan.

== Economy ==
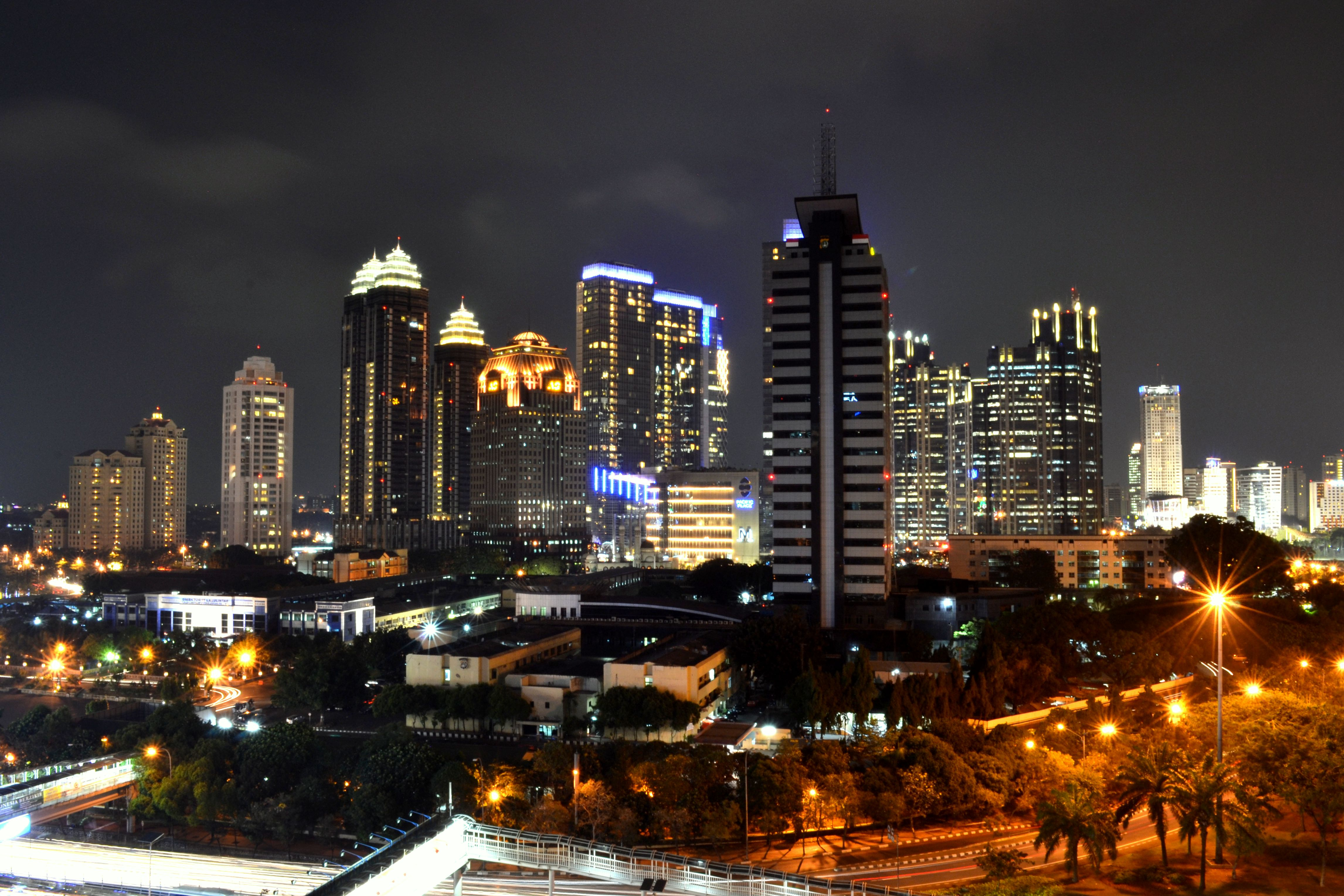
SCBD skyline at night

Province	GDP (billion IDR)	GDP (billion US$)
Jakarta	3,442,981	225.883
West Java	2,625,219	172.232
Banten	814,124	53.412
Greater Jakarta	6,882,324	451.257

Today, the role of the Jakarta metropolitan area in the national economy is still dominant although the decentralisation policy has been implemented since the political reforms in 1998. The region accounts for 25.52% of total national gross domestic product and 42.8% to the total GDP of Java in 2010. Central Jakarta, South Jakarta and Bekasi have respectively accounted for 4.14%; 3.78% and 2.11% of total national GDP. There are three dominant sectors which have a high contribution to the total Jakarta metropolitan area's GDP comprising: industrial sector (28.36%), financial sector (20.66%) as well as trade, hotel and restaurant sectors (20.24%). Based on the contribution of each sector to the total national GDP in 2010, Jakarta metropolitan area contributed 41.87% for the finance sector, 33.1% for construction and building, as well as 30.86% for transportation.

Prime business and commercial centres include the "Golden Triangle" in central Jakarta. There are Indonesia's premier financial centre, SCBD, Mega Kuningan, Rasuna Epicentrum as well as along Jalan Jenderal Sudirman, Jalan M.H. Thamrin, Jalan Jenderal Gatot Subroto and Jalan H.R. Rasuna Said. The Golden Triangle is also known to expatriates and locals as a lifestyle centre of the metropolis. There are countless high-end boutiques, fine restaurants, coffee shops and malls. Kelapa Gading is the newest business district, lifestyle centre and residential areas, located in the north-eastern part of Jakarta. It has several bars and entertainment places that open up until late at night.

The development of large scale residential areas and industrial parks in the Jakarta metropolitan area has been induced by infrastructure development, especially toll roads and railways. The Jakarta metropolitan area has been built industrial estate in the outskirts, mainly in Cikarang, home to a dozen industrial estates with more than 2,500 industrial companies. The Cikarang industrial estate occupied a total land area of about 11,000 hectares and became the largest concentration of manufacturing activities in Southeast Asia. Many foreign companies are located in the Cikarang industrial estate, such as from Japan, South Korea, China, Singapore and United States.

== Transportation ==
The region is partly defined by the areas from which people commute into the city. All municipality and regencies have access to toll road and rail service. At present public transport in Greater Jakarta consists of TransJakarta BRT, KRL Commuterline commuter rail, Jakarta LRT, Soekarno–Hatta Airport Commuter Line, Jakarta MRT and Jabodebek LRT. Jakarta LRT began operation by late 2019, and Jabodebek LRT began operation by 28 August 2023.

KRL Commuterline system map

Jabodebek LRT system map

=== Aviation ===
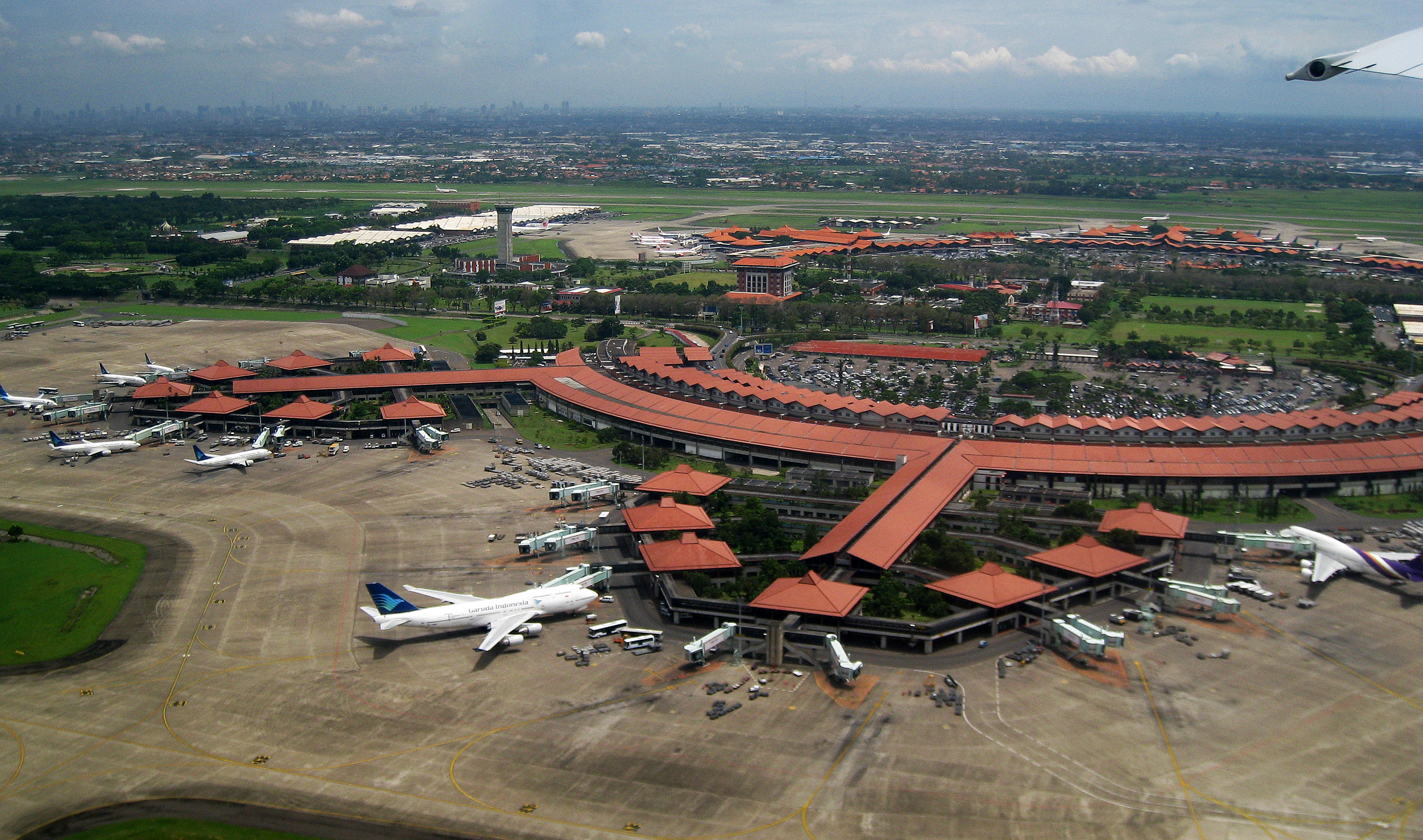
Soekarno–Hatta International Airport

The Jakarta metropolitan area has two major airports, Soekarno Hatta International Airport, commonly known as Cengkareng Airport (CGK) and Halim Perdanakusuma International Airport (chiefly domestic). Pondok Cabe Airport in South Tangerang, owned by the state oil company Pertamina, is used for civilian and military airport.

=== Rail ===
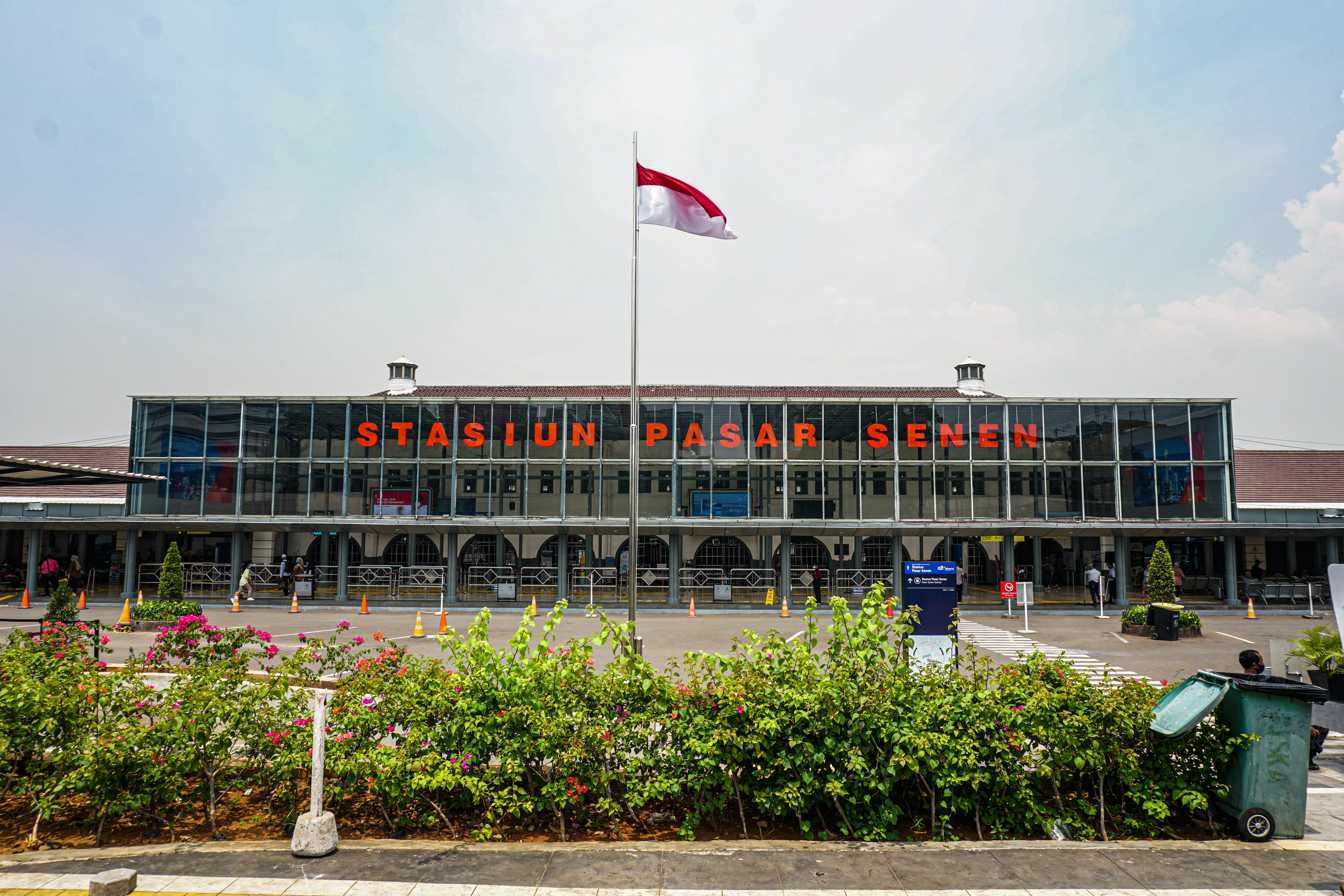
The facade of Pasar Senen Station

The Jakarta metropolitan area is served by KRL Commuterline, a 418 km (260 mi) commuter train comprising five lines (Red/Bogor Line, Green/Rangkasbitung Line, Blue/Cikarang Loop Line, Brown/Tangerang Line and Pink/Tanjung Priok Line) and over 80 stations across the area, plus Lebak Regency in Banten.

Urban rail systems in Jakarta include rapid transit system Jakarta MRT, and light rail system Jakarta LRT, and light rapid transit system Jabodebek LRT. Before Jakarta MRT was opened in 2019, the Jakarta metropolitan area was the world's largest metropolitan areas without a grade-separated rapid transit system.

Rail connection to Soekarno-Hatta International Airport is served by Soekarno-Hatta Airport Rail Link and Soekarno–Hatta Airport Skytrain inside the airport complex.

==== High-speed rail ====
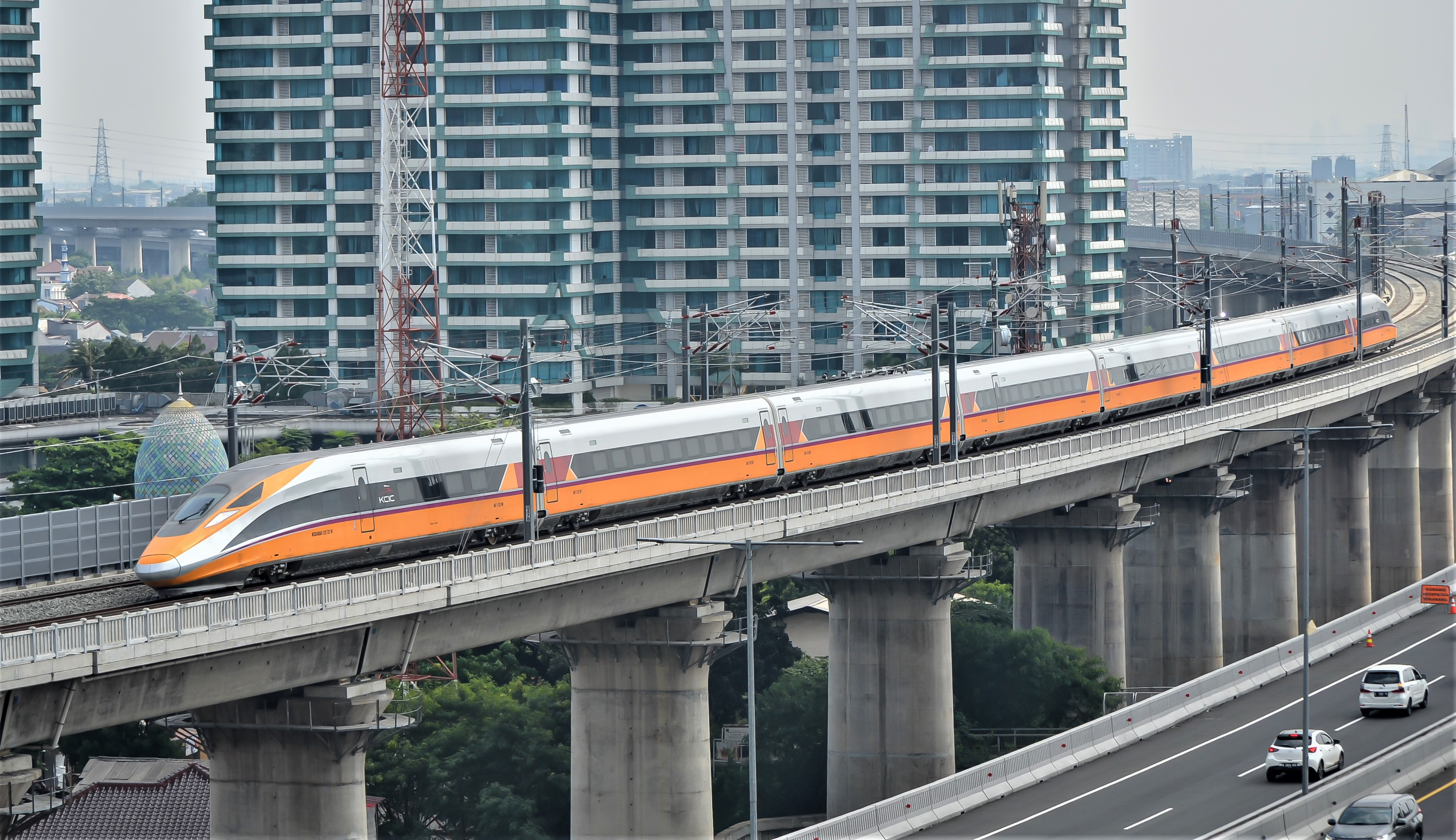
KCIC400AF-CIT passing through Bekasi

Indonesia operates a single high-speed rail service between the country's two largest cities, Jakarta and Bandung, branded Whoosh (short for Waktu Hemat, Operasi Optimal, Sistem Hebat, lit. 'Timesaving, Optimal Operation, Excellent System'). It is operated by the Kereta Cepat Indonesia China (KCIC).

Whoosh is the first high-speed railway in Southeast Asia, and the Southern Hemisphere and covers a distance of 143 kilometres (89 mi) with an operating speed of 350 km/h (220 mph), and design speed of KCIC400AF train of 420 km/h (260 mph), making it the second fastest commercially operating railway network in the world. The travel time between the two cities averages 45 minutes, down from three hours before its opening. Whoosh cost $7.3 billion to build.

The line began trial operation with passengers on 7 September 2023, and commercial operations on 17 October 2023. The Whoosh high speed train served 1 million passengers during 2 months of commercial operation from 17 October to 25 December 2023.

=== Bus ===
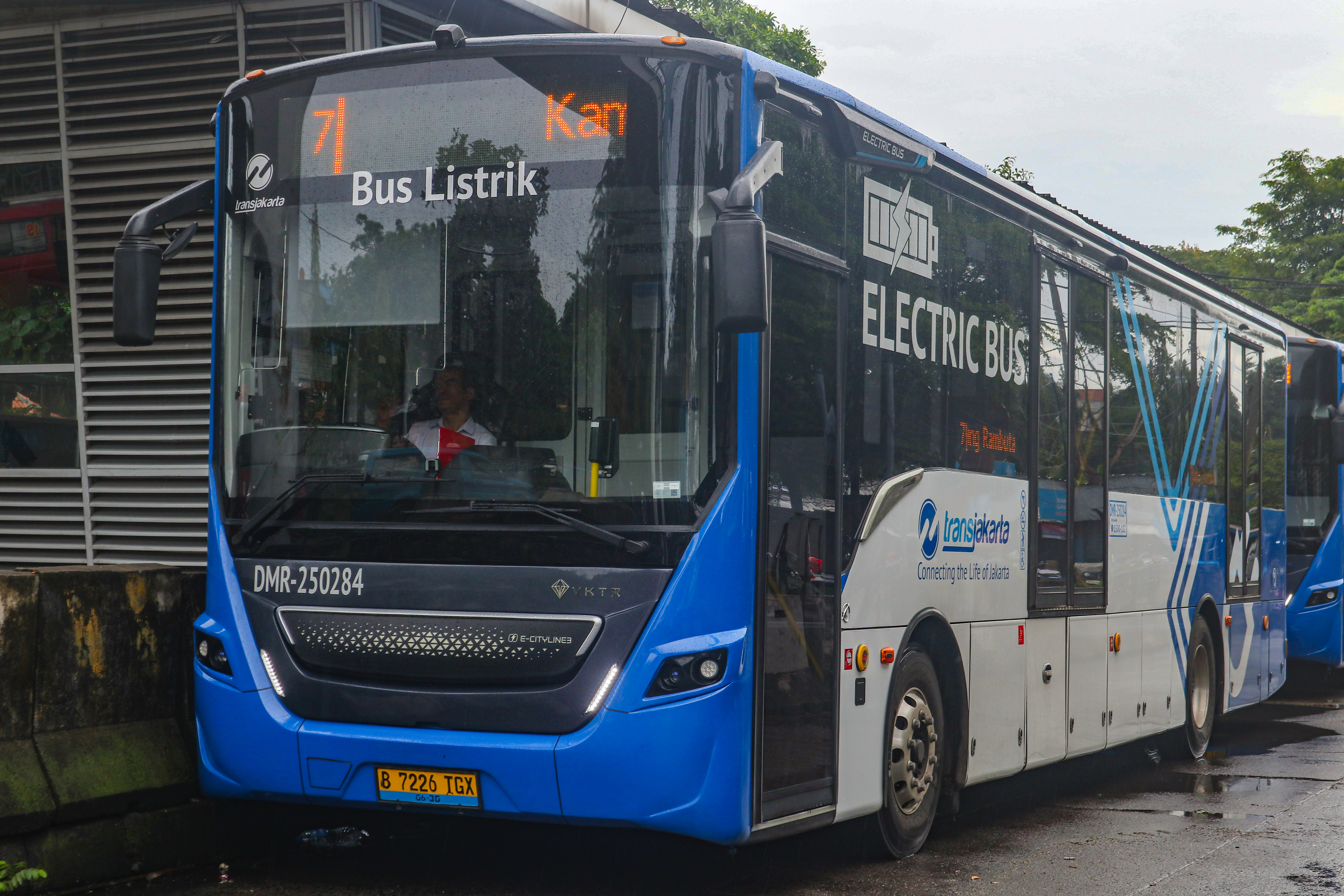
An electric Transjakarta bus fleet in Kampung Rambutan

The Transjakarta bus rapid transit service was developed throughout Jakarta and currently has 14 active corridors and a further five in planning. The system connects Bekasi, Bogor, Depok, and Tangerang with four routes connecting Jakarta with Bekasi vice versa, namely Summarecon Bekasi–Cawang, East Bekasi–Cawang, Vida Bekasi–Cawang Sentral via Jatiasih, East Bekasi–Dukuh Atas via Becakayu Toll Road, and Cikarang Jababeka–Cawang Sentral via Grand Wisata Bekasi. While for Depok, four routes are currently active: UI–Manggarai, UI–Lebak Bulus, Terminal Depok–Cawang Sentral via the Cijago toll road, and Sawangan–Lebak Bulus via Desari toll road. In addition to the main corridors, the feeder buses of Transjakarta serves commuters from satellite cities, such as Bumi Serpong Damai, Bintaro Jaya, and Alam Sutera (South Tangerang), as well as Pantai Indah Kapuk 2 (Tangerang Regency) and Bogor.

== See also ==
- List of metropolitan areas by population
- List of metropolitan areas in Indonesia
- Surabaya metropolitan area
- Bandung metropolitan area
- Medan metropolitan area
- Semarang metropolitan area
- Makassar metropolitan area
