= City status in Indonesia =

Administrative division of Indonesia

In Indonesian law, the term "city" (kota) is generally defined as the second-level administrative subdivision of the Republic of Indonesia, an equivalent to regency (kabupaten). The difference between a city and a regency is that a city has non-agricultural economic activities and a dense urban population, while a regency comprises predominantly rural areas and is larger in area than a city. However, Indonesia historically had several classifications of cities.

According to Kamus Besar Bahasa Indonesia, the official dictionary of the Indonesian language, a city (kota) is "a densely populated area with high density and modern facilities and most of the population works outside of agriculture."

Cities are divided into districts (Kecamatan, Distrik in Papua region, or Kemantren in Yogyakarta).

== Historical classification ==
Buitenzorg was granted city status (gemeente) by the government of the Dutch East Indies on 1 April 1905

=== Gemeente ===
During the Dutch East Indies period, a city was governed as gemeente, or municipality, since the decentralisation law in 1903. The gemeente was a third-level subdivision, below residentie (residency) and gouvernement (governorate) or provincie (province).

=== Kota besar and kota kecil ===
The terms kota besar (big city), and kota kecil (small city or town), were used since the implementation of the Act Number 22 of 1948. Kota Besar was an urban equivalent of kabupaten (regency), which was the country's second level subdivision, just below province. Kota kecil, used for a small urban area, was the third-level division below regency and province.

=== Kotaraya, kotamadya, and kotapraja ===
City classification in Indonesia during 1965–1974
| City type | Subdivision level | Equivalence |
|---|---|---|
| Kotaraya | First-level | Province |
| Kotamadya | Second-level | Regency |
| Kotapraja | Third-level | Districts |

According to the Act Number 18 of 1965, cities in Indonesia were classified into three: kotaraya (great city, first-level subdivision), kotamadya (medium city, second-level subdivision), and kotapraja (small city or town, third-level subdivision). Kotaraya is an equivalent of a province, kotamadya is an equivalent of a regency, while kotapraja is an equivalent of kecamatan (districts). Jakarta was the only city granted the kotaraya status, due to its function as the capital of Indonesia.

The terms kotaraya and kotapraja had been abolished since 1974, and kotamadya was used for most of urban areas in Indonesia up to 1999. Jakarta continued to be the only urban area with a province status.

=== Kota administratif ===
Between 1974 and 1999, kota administratif (administrative city) or kotif were extent in Indonesia. The kotif contained one or multiple districts, and was an intermediate level of government between the regency and the district. A kotif had an administrative mayor as an executive officer responsible to the regent, but lacked a legislative body. In 1999, the kotif were abolished and existing kotif were either upgraded into full cities or absorbed into their regency.

=== Kota ===
The term kota (city) has been implemented to substitute kotamadya since the post-Suharto era in Indonesia. Kota is headed by a mayor (walikota), who is directly elected via elections to serve for a five-year term, which can be renewed for one further five-year term. Each kota is divided further into districts, more commonly known as kecamatan.

== Jakarta as a city ==
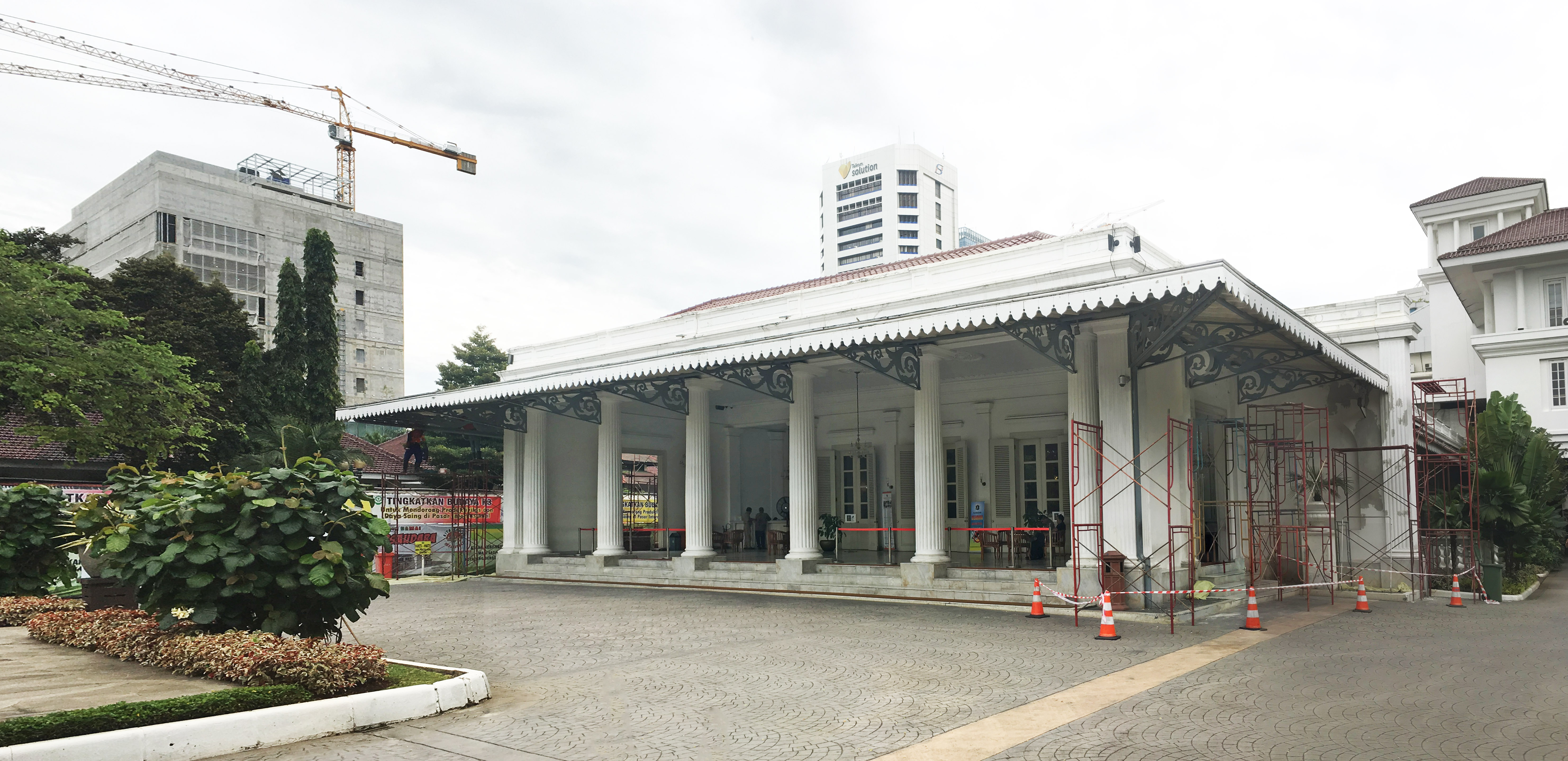
Jakarta City Hall, the seat of the governor of Jakarta

Jakarta, then known as Batavia, was the first city in the archipelago to be developed by the Dutch Empire. On the 4 March 1621, the first city government (stad) was created in Batavia, and on 1 April 1905, it became the very first municipality (gemeente) of the Dutch East Indies. Upon Indonesian independence, it remains as the city within the province of West Java. With the release of the Act Number 1 of 1957, Jakarta became the first provincial-level city in Indonesia. Although Jakarta is now written as a 'province' in Indonesian law products, it is still widely referred to as a city. The United Nations (UN) classifies Jakarta as a 'city' on its statistical database.

The Special Region of Jakarta consists of five 'administrative cities' and one 'administrative regency'. Unlike other actual cities in Indonesia, administrative cities in Jakarta are not self-governing, and were only created for bureaucracy purposes. The administrative cities do not have city councils, and their mayors were exclusively selected by the Governor of Jakarta without any public election. Ryas Rasyid, an Indonesian regional government expert, stated that Jakarta is a "province with a city management". Anies Baswedan, the 17th Governor of Jakarta, asserted that "Jakarta has only an area of 600 square kilometres. It is a city with the province status." Unlike the other 37 Indonesian provinces whose governors work in a 'governor office' (Kantor Gubernur), the governor of Jakarta works in a city hall (Balai Kota DKI Jakarta).

== List of cities by date of incorporation ==
| City | Date incorporated | First city status | Present-day province |
|---|---|---|---|
| Jakarta^{[a]} | 4 March 1621 | Stad | Special Region of Jakarta |
| Bogor^{[b]} | 1 April 1905 | Gemeente | West Java |
| Bandung | 1 April 1906 | Gemeente | West Java |
| Blitar | 1 April 1906 | Gemeente | East Java |
| Cirebon | 1 April 1906 | Gemeente | West Java |
| Kediri | 1 April 1906 | Gemeente | East Java |
| Makassar | 1 April 1906 | Gemeente | South Sulawesi |
| Magelang | 1 April 1906 | Gemeente | Central Java |
| Padang | 1 April 1906 | Gemeente | West Sumatra |
| Palembang | 1 April 1906 | Gemeente | South Sumatra |
| Pekalongan | 1 April 1906 | Gemeente | Central Java |
| Semarang | 1 April 1906 | Gemeente | Central Java |
| Surabaya | 1 April 1906 | Gemeente | East Java |
| Tegal | 1 April 1906 | Gemeente | Central Java |
| Medan | 1 April 1909 | Gemeente | North Sumatra |
| Malang | 1 April 1914 | Gemeente | East Java |
| Sukabumi | 1 April 1914 | Gemeente | West Java |
| Binjai | 1 July 1917 | Gemeente | North Sumatra |
| Pematang Siantar | 1 July 1917 | Gemeente | North Sumatra |
| Tanjung Balai | 1 July 1917 | Gemeente | North Sumatra |
| Tebing Tinggi | 1 July 1917 | Gemeente | North Sumatra |
| Salatiga | 1 July 1917 | Gemeente | Central Java |
| Madiun | 20 June 1918 | Gemeente | East Java |
| Mojokerto | 20 June 1918 | Gemeente | East Java |
| Pasuruan | 20 June 1918 | Gemeente | East Java |
| Bukittinggi^{[c]} | 1 July 1918 | Gemeente | West Sumatra |
| Probolinggo | 1 July 1918 | Gemeente | East Java |
| Sawahlunto | 1 July 1918 | Gemeente | West Sumatra |
| Banjarmasin | 1 July 1919 | Gemeente | South Kalimantan |
| Manado | 1 July 1919 | Gemeente | North Sulawesi |
| Banda Aceh^{[d]} | 17 May 1946 | Kota otonom B | Aceh |
| Bengkulu | 17 May 1946 | Kota otonom B | Bengkulu |
| Jambi | 17 May 1946 | Kota otonom B | Jambi |
| Pangkal Pinang | 17 May 1946 | Kota otonom B | Bangka Belitung Islands |
| Pekanbaru | 17 May 1946 | Kota otonom B | Riau |
| Sibolga | 17 May 1946 | Kota otonom B | North Sumatra |
| Bandar Lampung^{[e]} | 17 May 1946 | Kota otonom B | Lampung |
| Pontianak | 14 August 1946 | Landschaps-gemeente | West Kalimantan |
| Surakarta | 5 June 1947 | Haminte Kota | Central Java |
| Yogyakarta | 8 June 1947 | Haminte Kota | Special Region of Yogyakarta |
| Padang Panjang | 23 March 1956 | Kota Kecil | West Sumatra |
| Payakumbuh | 23 March 1956 | Kota Kecil | West Sumatra |
| Solok | 23 March 1956 | Kota Kecil | West Sumatra |
| Palangka Raya | 17 July 1957 | Kotapraja (2nd-level) | Central Kalimantan |
| Balikpapan | 26 June 1959 | Kotapraja (2nd-level) | East Kalimantan |
| Samarinda | 26 June 1959 | Kotapraja (2nd-level) | East Kalimantan |
| Gorontalo | 4 July 1959 | Kotapraja (2nd-level) | Gorontalo |
| Ambon | 31 July 1958 | Kotapraja (2nd-level) | Maluku |
| Parepare | 4 July 1959 | Kotapraja (2nd-level) | South Sulawesi |
| Sabang | 14 June 1965 | Kotapraja (2nd-level) | Aceh |
| Batam | 7 December 1983 | Kotamadya | Riau Islands |
| Bitung | 15 August 1990 | Kotamadya | North Sulawesi |
| Denpasar | 15 January 1992 | Kotamadya | Bali |
| Tangerang | 27 February 1993 | Kotamadya | Banten |
| Mataram | 26 July 1993 | Kotamadya | West Nusa Tenggara |
| Jayapura | 2 August 1993 | Kotamadya | Papua |
| Palu | 22 July 1994 | Kotamadya | Central Sulawesi |
| Kendari | 3 August 1995 | Kotamadya | Southeast Sulawesi |
| Kupang | 11 April 1996 | Kotamadya | East Nusa Tenggara |
| Bekasi | 16 December 1996 | Kotamadya | West Java |
| Tarakan | 8 October 1997 | Kotamadya | North Kalimantan |
| Banjarbaru | 20 April 1999 | Kotamadya | South Kalimantan |
| Cilegon | 20 April 1999 | Kotamadya | Banten |
| Depok | 20 April 1999 | Kotamadya | West Java |
| Dumai | 20 April 1999 | Kotamadya | Riau |
| Metro | 20 April 1999 | Kotamadya | Lampung |
| Ternate | 20 April 1999 | Kotamadya | North Maluku |
| Bontang | 4 October 1999 | Kota | East Kalimantan |
| Sorong | 4 October 1999 | Kota | West Papua |
| Batu | 21 June 2001 | Kota | East Java |
| Baubau | 21 June 2001 | Kota | Southeast Sulawesi |
| Cimahi | 21 June 2001 | Kota | West Java |
| Langsa | 21 June 2001 | Kota | Aceh |
| Lhokseumawe | 21 June 2001 | Kota | Aceh |
| Lubuklinggau | 21 June 2001 | Kota | South Sumatra |
| Padang Sidempuan | 21 June 2001 | Kota | North Sumatra |
| Pagar Alam | 21 June 2001 | Kota | South Sumatra |
| Prabumulih | 21 June 2001 | Kota | South Sumatra |
| Singkawang | 21 June 2001 | Kota | West Kalimantan |
| Tanjung Pinang | 21 June 2001 | Kota | Riau Islands |
| Tasikmalaya | 21 June 2001 | Kota | West Java |
| Banjar | 11 December 2002 | Kota | West Java |
| Bima | 10 April 2002 | Kota | West Nusa Tenggara |
| Palopo | 10 April 2002 | Kota | South Sulawesi |
| Pariaman | 10 April 2002 | Kota | West Sumatra |
| Tidore | 25 February 2003 | Kota | North Maluku |
| Tomohon | 25 February 2003 | Kota | North Sulawesi |
| Kotamobagu | 2 January 2007 | Kota | North Sulawesi |
| Subulussalam | 2 January 2007 | Kota | Aceh |
| Serang | 10 August 2007 | Kota | Banten |
| Tual | 10 August 2007 | Kota | Maluku |
| Sungai Penuh | 21 July 2008 | Kota | Jambi |
| Gunungsitoli | 26 November 2008 | Kota | North Sumatra |
| South Tangerang | 26 November 2008 | Kota | Banten |

Notes

- ^{^[a]} Incorporated as Batavia
- ^{^[b]} Incorporated as Buitenzorg
- ^{^[c]} Incorporated as Fort de Kock
- ^{^[d]} Incorporated as Kutaraja
- ^{^[e]} Incorporated as Tanjungkarang–Telukbetung

== See also ==
- City status
- List of Indonesian cities by population
- List of Indonesian cities by GDP
- Kreisfreie Stadt, a similar administrative division found in Germany
