= North Bogor =

North Bogor Bogor Utara Bogor Kalér
- District
- Interactive map of North Bogor
- Country: Indonesia
- Province: West Java
- City: Bogor

Government
  - Head of District (Camat): Riki Robiansah

Area
  - Total: 18.88 km^{2} (7.29 sq mi)

Population (mid 2023 estimate)
  - Total: 204,454
  - Density: 10,829/km^{2} (28,050/sq mi)
- Time zone: UTC+7 (IWST)
- Area code: (+62) 251
- Vehicle registration: F
- Villages: 8
- Website: kecbogorutara.kotabogor.go.id

North Bogor (Indonesian: Bogor Utara, Sundanese: ᮘᮧᮌᮧᮁ ᮊᮜᮦᮁ, romanized: Bogor Kalér) is one of the six administrative districts (kecamatan) in the city of Bogor, West Java Province, Indonesia. The former western half of this district was split off in 1992 to form a new Tanahsareal District; the residual district covers an area of 18.88 km^{2}, and had a population of 170,443 at the 2010 Census and 186,724 at the 2020 Census; the official estimate as at mid 2023 was 204,454. Administratively it is divided into eight villages (kelurahan).

== Administrative division ==
Kode Wilayah	English name	Indonesian name	Area in km^{2}	Population mid 2022 estimate	Density 2022 (per/Km²)	Post code
32.71.05.1001	Bantarjati	Kelurahan Bantarjati	1.89	25,828	13,666	16153
32.71.05.1002	Tegal Gundil	Kelurahan Tegal Gundil	1.89	29,881	15,810	16152
32.71.05.1003	Kedunghalang	Kelurahan Kedunghalang	1.87	23,936	12,800	16158
32.71.05.1004	Ciparigi	Kelurahan Ciparigi	1.82	27,005	14,838	16157
32.71.05.1005	Cibuluh	Kelurahan Cibuluh	1.97	20,678	10,497	16151
32.71.05.1006	Ciluar	Kelurahan Ciluar	2.45	16,679	6,808	16156
32.71.05.1007	Tanah Baru	Kelurahan Tanah Baru	3.55	27,917	7,864	16154
32.71.05.1008	Cimahpar	Kelurahan Cimahpar	3.45	25,087	7,272	16155
