= Central Bogor =

Central Bogor Bogor Tengah
- District
- Interactive map of Central Bogor
- Country: Indonesia
- Province: West Java
- City: Bogor

Area
  - Total: 8.11 km^{2} (3.13 sq mi)

Population (mid 2023 estimate)
  - Total: 109,057
  - Density: 13,400/km^{2} (34,800/sq mi)
- Time zone: UTC+7 (IWST)
- Area code: (+62) 251
- Vehicle registration: F
- Villages: 11
- Website: kecbogortengah.kotabogor.go.id

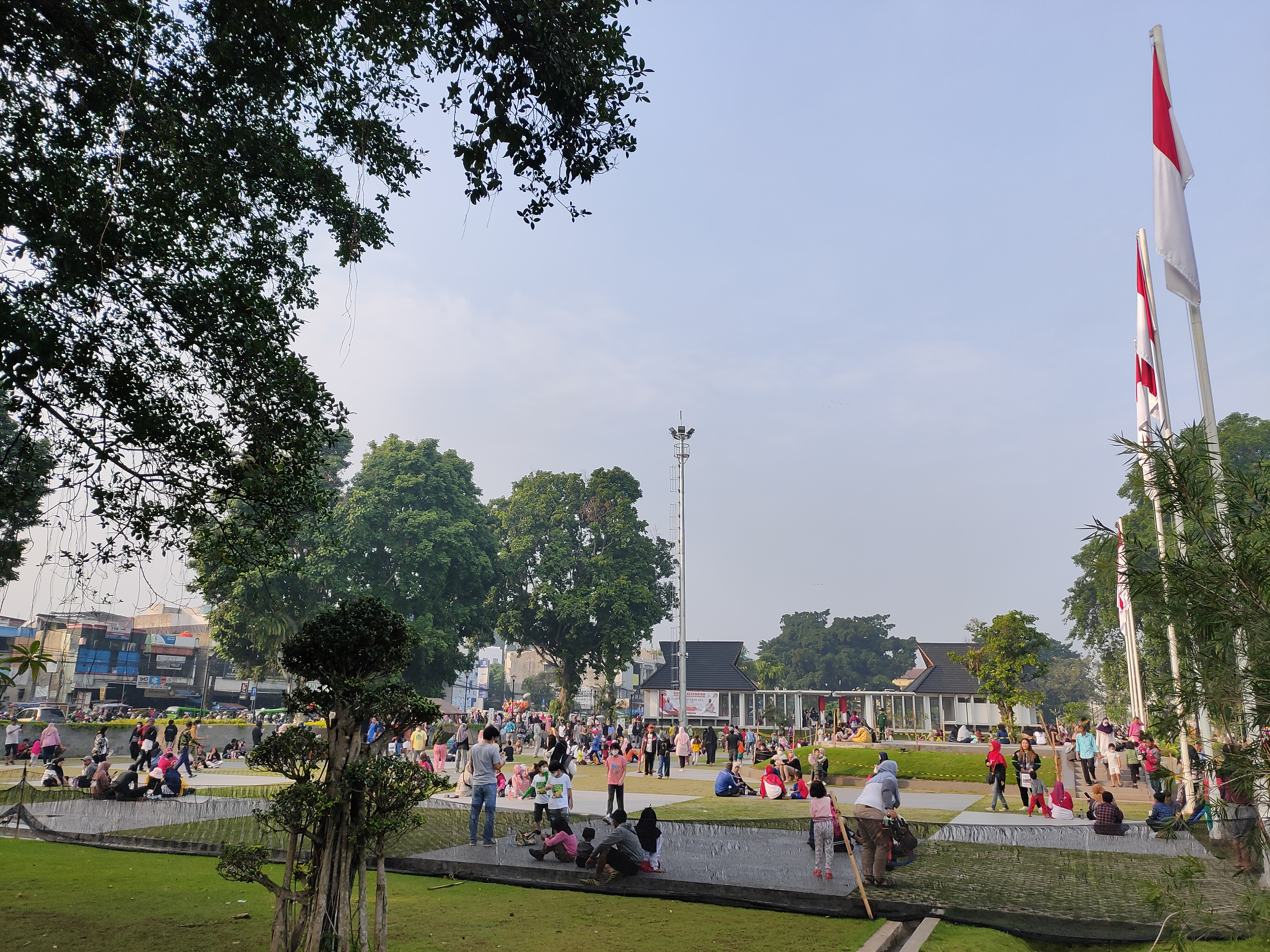
Alun-Alun Bogor 00

Central Bogor (Indonesian: Bogor Tengah; Sundanese: ᮘᮧᮌᮧᮁ ᮒᮨᮍᮂ, romanized: Bogor Tengah) is one of the six administrative districts (kecamatan) in the city of Bogor, West Java Province, Indonesia. The district covers an area of 8.11 km^{2}, and had a population of 101,398 at the 2010 Census and 96,258 at the 2020 Census; the official estimate as at mid 2023 was 109,057. Administratively it is divided into eleven villages (kelurahan), listed below with their areas and their populations as at mid 2022.

== Administrative Division ==
=== Urban Villages ===
Kode Wilayah	English name	Indonesian name	Area in km^{2}	Population mid 2022 estimate	Density 2022 (per/Km²)	Post code
32.71.02.1001	Gudang Village	Kelurahan Gudang	0.33	8,141	25,042	16123
32.71.03.1002	Paledang Village	Kelurahan Paledang	1.76	12,571	7,133	16122
32.71.03.1003	Pabaton Village	Kelurahan Pabaton	0.63	3,225	5,087	16121
32.71.03.1004	Cibogor Village	Kelurahan Cibogor	0.47	8,167	17,561	16124
32.71.03.1005	Babakan Village	Kelurahan Babakan	1.48	8,119	5,500	16128
43.71.03.1006	Sempur Village	Kelurahan Sempur	0.59	8,840	14,922	16129
32.71.03.1007	Tegallega Village	Kelurahan Tegallega	1.16	19,270	16,662	16129
32.71.03.1008	Babakanpasar Village	Kelurahan Babakan Pasar	0.36	11,717	32,514	16126
32.71.03.1009	Panaragan Village	Kelurahan Panaragan	0.28	8,152	28,982	16125
32.71.03.1010	Ciwaringin Village	Kelurahan Ciwaringin	0.79	8,635	10,877	16124
32.71.03.1011	Kebonkalapa Village	Kelurahan Kebonkalapa	0.52	12,486	24,085	16125
Totals Central Bogor District			8.37	109,331	13,067	
