= Tanahsareal =

Tanah Sareal Bogor Tengah
- District
- Location in Bogor, Java and Indonesia
- Country: Indonesia
- Province: West Java
- City: Bogor
- Established: 14 August 1992

Area
  - Total: 21.25 km^{2} (8.20 sq mi)

Population (mid 2023 estimate)
  - Total: 231,040
  - Density: 11,036/km^{2} (28,580/sq mi)
- Time zone: UTC+7 (IWST)
- Area code: (+62) 251
- Vehicle registration: F
- Villages: 11
- Website: kectanahsareal.kotabogor.go.id

Tanah Sareal is one of the six administrative districts (kecamatan) in the city of Bogor, West Java Province, Indonesia. The district covers an area of 21.25 km^{2}, and had a population of 190,919 at the 2010 Census and 218,094 at the 2020 Census; the official estimate as at mid 2023 was 231,040. Administratively it is divided into eleven villages (kelurahan), listed below with their areas and their populations as at mid 2022.

== History ==
Tanah Sareal was previously part of North Bogor district before it was split off from the western part of the district in 1992.

== Administrative Division ==
=== Urban Villages ===
Kode Wilayah	English name	Indonesian name	Area in km^{2}	Population mid 2022 estimate	Density 2022 (per/Km²)	Post code
32.71.06.1001	Tanahsareal Village	Kelurahan Tanahsareal	1.14	10,122	8,870	16161
32.71.06.1002	Kebonpedes Village	Kelurahan Kebonpedes	1.09	25,275	23,270	16162
32.71.06.1003	Kedungbadak Village	Kelurahan Kedungbadak	2.40	30,777	12,817	16164
32.71.06.1004	Sukaresmi Village	Kelurahan Sukaresmi	1.37	15,459	11,316	16165
32.71.06.1005	Kedungwaringin Village	Kelurahanwedung Waringin	1.42	24,183	17,028	16164
43.71.06.1006	Kedungjaya Village	Kelurahan Kedungjaya	0.92	13,475	14,607	16164
32.71.06.1007	Sukadamai Village	Kelurahan Sukadamai	1.57	18,089	11,525	16165
32.71.06.1008	Mekarwangi Village	Kelurahan Mekarwangi	2.42	23,754	9,833	16168
32.71.06.1009	Kencana Village	Kelurahan Kencana	2.59	22,298	8,597	16167
32.71.06.1010	Kayumanis Village	Kelurahan Kayumanis	2.58	16,202	6,276	16169
32.71.06.1011	Cibadak Village	Kelurahan Cibadak	3.10	27,707	8,932	16166
Totals Tanah Sareal District			20.60	227,341	11,036	
