= Bogor =

City in West Java, Indonesia

Bogor: Pakuan Pajajaran; Buitenzorg
- City
- City of Bogor; Kota Bogor

Regional transcription(s)
  - Sundanese: ᮓᮚᮩᮂ ᮘᮧᮌᮧᮁ
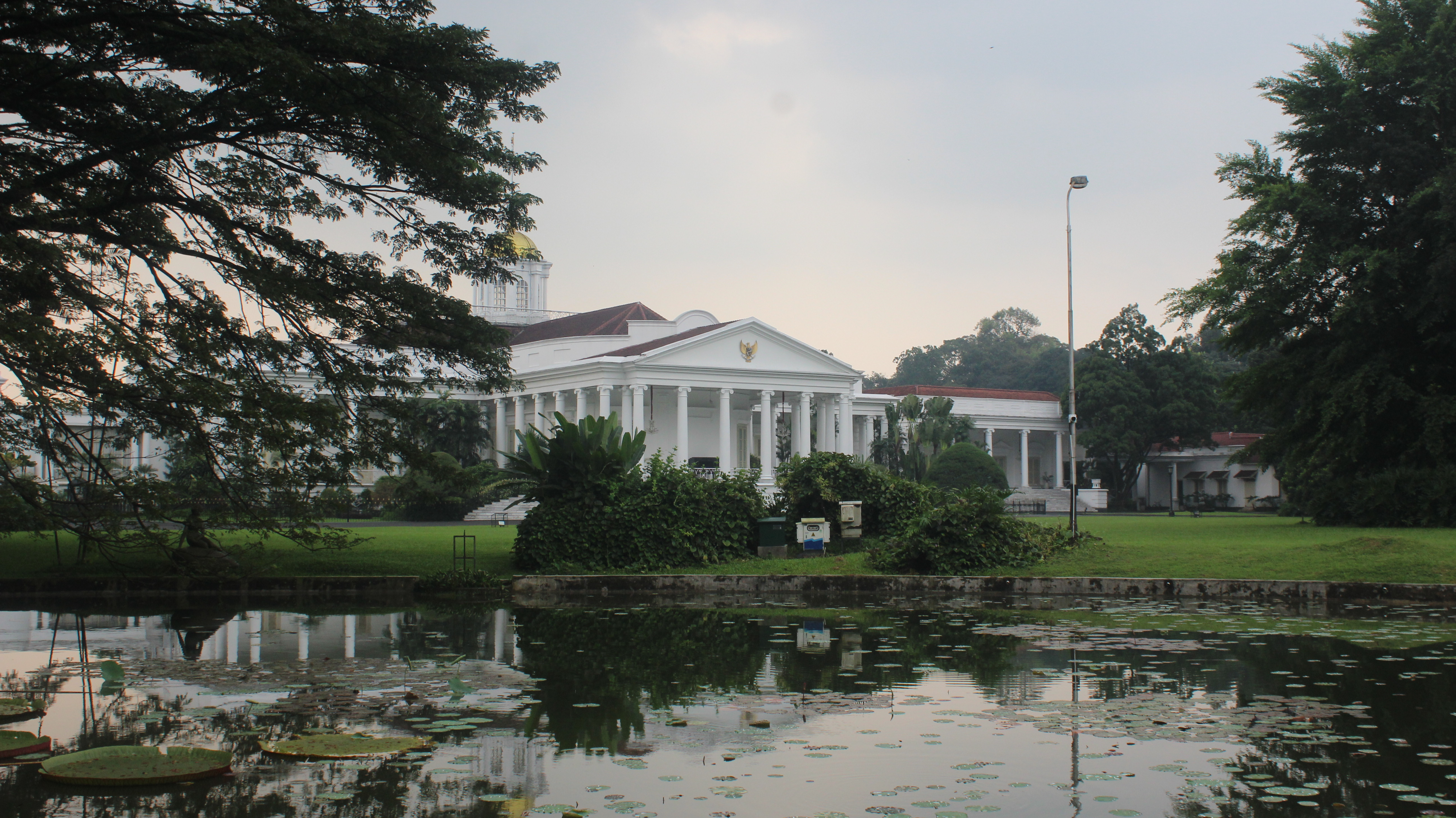
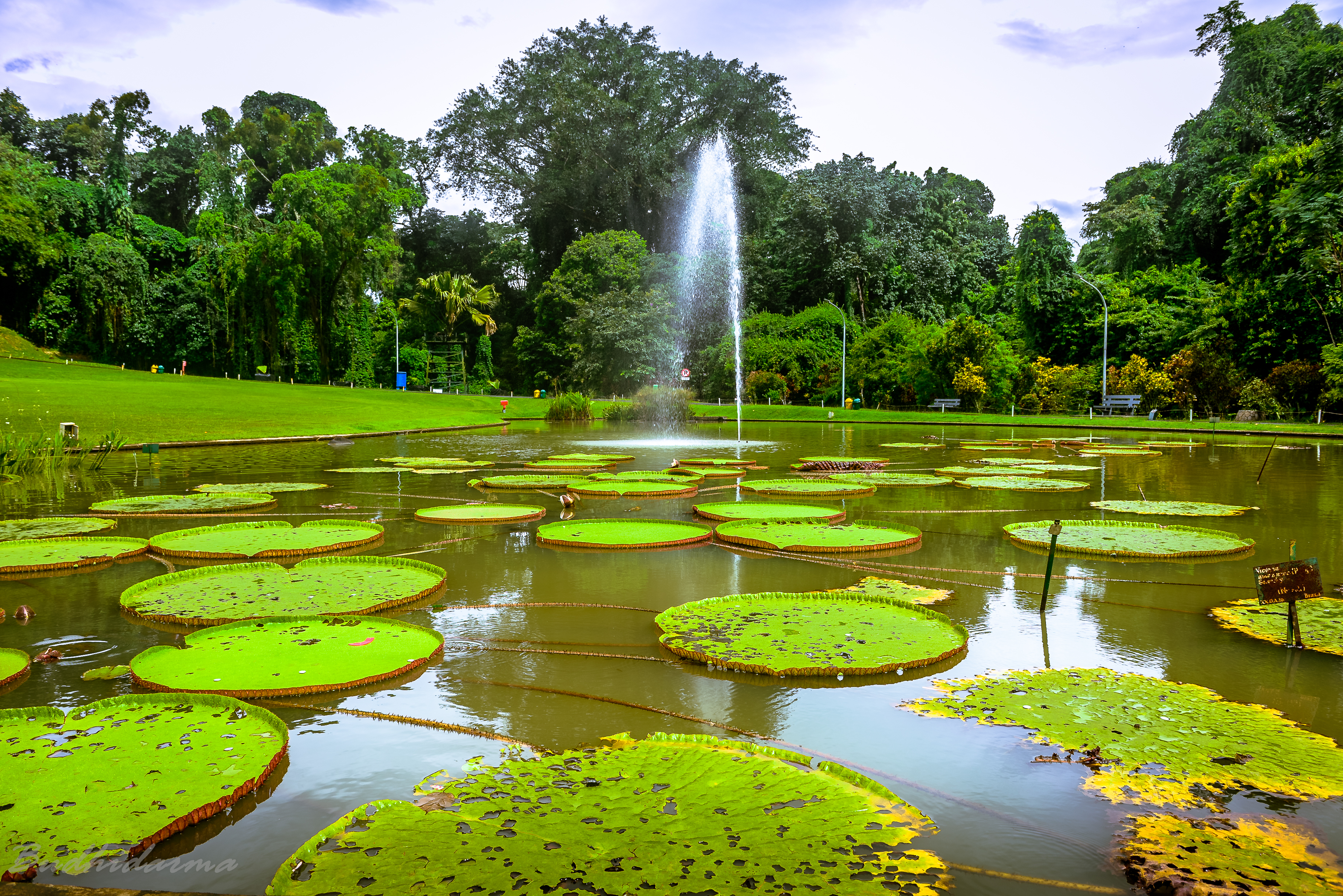
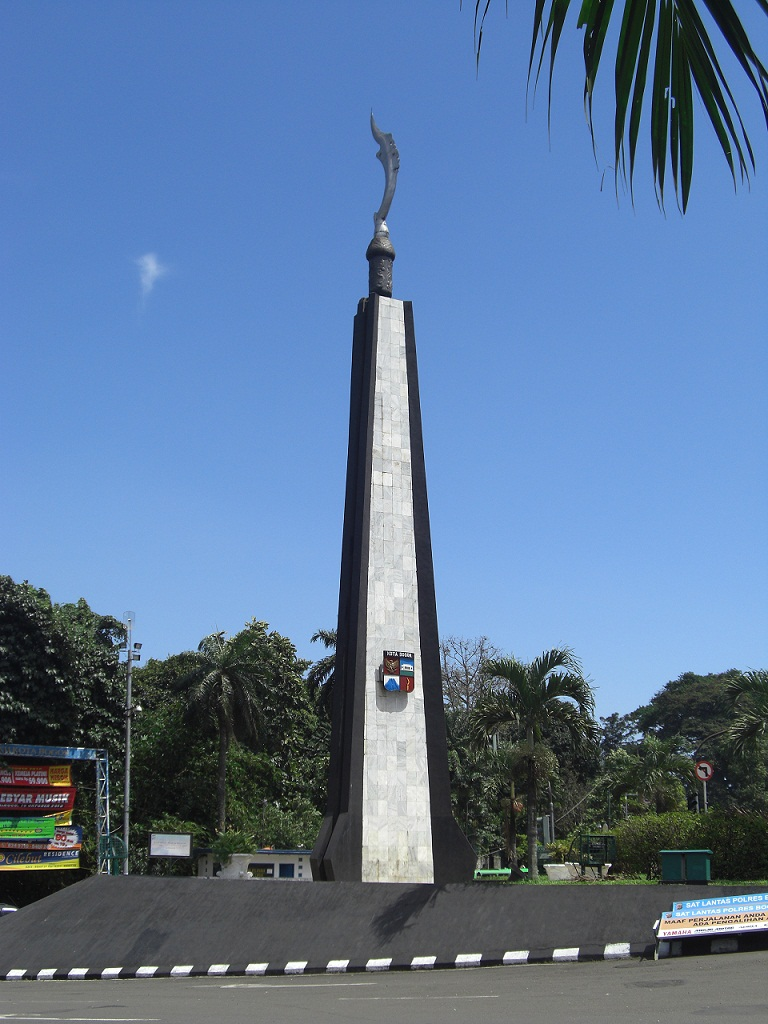
- From top, left to right: Bogor Palace, Bogor Botanical Gardens, and Kujang Monument

- Flag Coat of arms
- Nicknames: Kota Hujan "Rainy City"
- Motto: Di nu kiwari ngancik nu bihari seja ayeuna sampeureun jaga (Sundanese) ᮓᮤ ᮔᮥ ᮊᮤᮝᮛᮤ ᮍᮔ᮪ᮎᮤᮊ᮪ ᮔᮥ ᮘᮤᮠᮛᮤ ᮞᮨᮏ ᮃᮚᮩᮔ ᮞᮙ᮪ᮕᮩᮛᮩᮔ᮪ ᮏᮌ "Preserving the past, serving the people, and facing the future"
- Location within West Java

- Location in Java and Indonesia Bogor City (Indonesia)
- Coordinates: 6°35′48″S 106°47′50″E
- Country: Indonesia
- Province: West Java
- Metropolitan area: Jabodetabek
- Founded: 669 AD
- Settled: 3 June 1482
- Incorporated (as gemeente): 1 April 1905 (Gemeente Buitenzorg)
- Other names: Pakuan Pajajaran (669 AD–1746); Buitenzorg (1746–1942; 1945–1949)
- Administrative division: 6 districts 68 urban villages

Government
  - Mayor: Dedie Abdu Rachim (PAN)
  - Vice mayor: Jenal Mutaqin

Area
  - Total: 111.39 km^{2} (43.01 sq mi)
- Elevation: 265 m (869 ft)

Population (mid 2024 official estimate)
  - Total: 1,078,351
  - Density: 9,680.9/km^{2} (25,073/sq mi)
- Demonyms: Bogorian
- Time zone: UTC+7 (W.I.B)
- Postcodes: 16100 to 16169
- Area code: (+62) 251
- Vehicle registration: F
- Nominal GDP: 2022
- Total: Rp 52.9 trillion (24th) $ 3.6 billion
- Per capita: Rp 49,755 thousand $ 3,351
- HDI (2023): ▲0.779 High
- Website: kotabogor.go.id

Bogor (Sundanese: ᮘᮧᮌᮧᮁ; Dutch: Buitenzorg) is a landlocked city in West Java, Indonesia. Located around 53 kilometers (33 mi) south of the national capital of Jakarta, it is the 6th largest city in the Jakarta metropolitan area and the 14th overall nationwide.

The city covers an area of 111.39 km^{2}, and it had a population of 950,334 at the 2010 Census and 1,043,070 at the 2020 Census. The official population estimate as at 2025 was 1,281,010.

Bogor is an important center of economy, science, cultural heritage and tourism in Indonesia because this city is a mountainous area that used to be a resting place for Dutch nobles during the Dutch colonial period because of its cool climate and the many classical European-style buildings in the city. During the Middle Ages, the city served as the capital of the Sunda Kingdom (Sundanese: Karajaan Sunda) and was called Pakuan Pajajaran or Dayeuh Pakuan. During the Dutch colonial era, it was named Buitenzorg ("without worries" in Dutch) and served as the summer residence of the Governor-General of the Dutch East Indies.

With several hundred thousand people living in an area of about 20 km^{2} (7.7 sq mi), the central part of Bogor is one of the world's most densely populated areas. The city has a presidential palace and a botanical garden (Indonesian: Kebun Raya Bogor) – one of the oldest and largest in the world. It bears the nickname "Rainy City" (Kota Hujan), because of frequent rain showers, even during the dry season.

In the 1990s–2000s, the city regularly hosted various international events, such as ministry-level meetings of the Asia-Pacific institutions and the APEC summit of 15 November 1994.

== History ==
=== Precolonial period ===
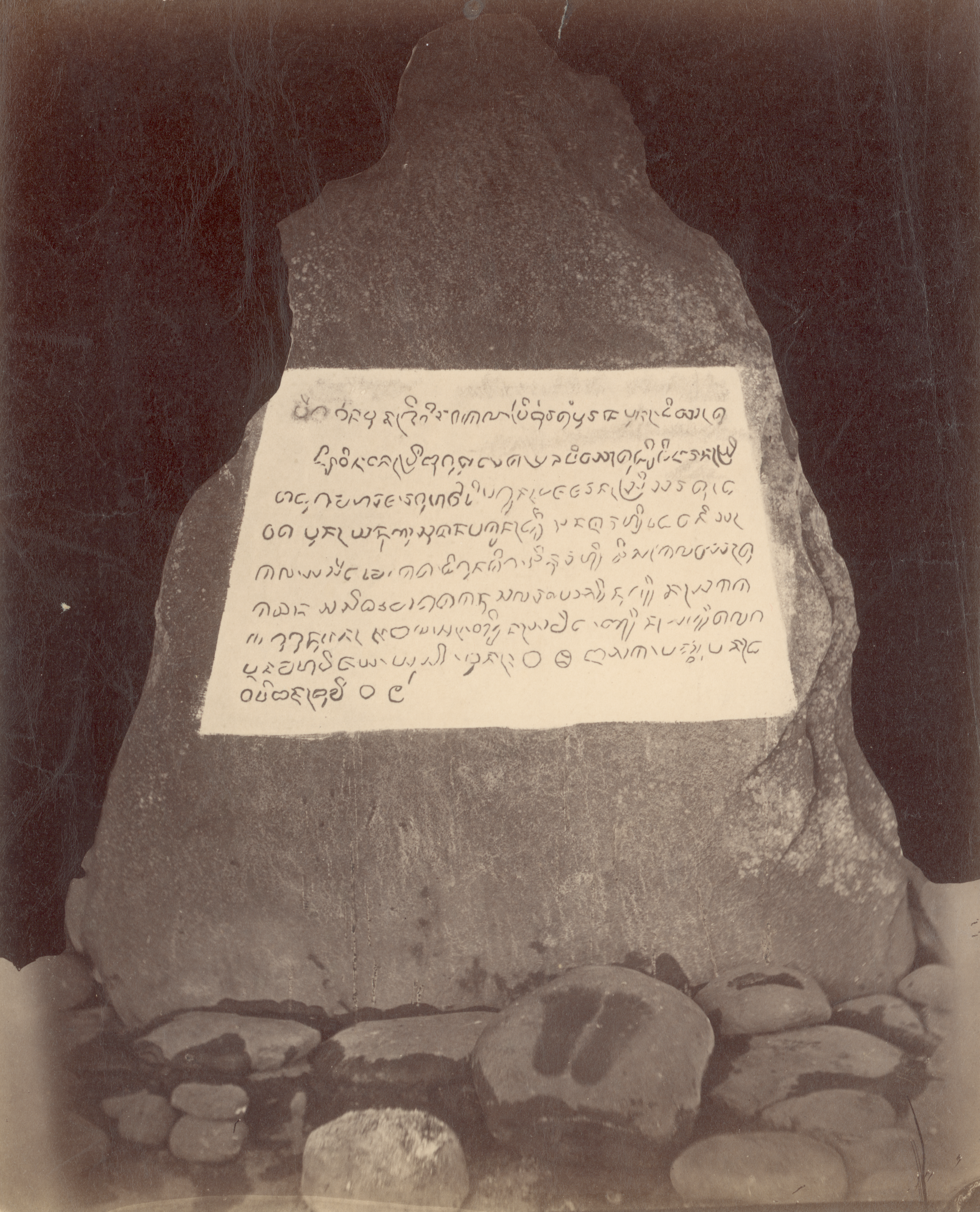
Batutulis inscription (dated 1533), commemorate the great King of Sunda Sri Baduga Maharaja (rule 1482–1521)

The first mention of a settlement at present Bogor dates to the 5th century when the area was part of Tarumanagara, one of the earliest states in Indonesian history. After a series of defeats by the neighboring Srivijaya, Tarumanagara was transformed into the Sunda Kingdom, and in 669, the capital of Sunda was built between two parallel rivers, the Ciliwung and Cisadane. It was named Pakuan Pajajaran, in old Sundanese meaning "a place between the parallel [rivers]", and became the predecessor of the modern Bogor.

Over the next several centuries, Pakuan Pajajaran became one of the largest cities in medieval Indonesia with a population reaching 48,000. The name Pajajaran was then used from the 16th century for the entire kingdom, and the capital was simply called Pakuan. The chronicles of that time were written in Sanskrit, which was the language used for official and religious purposes, using the Pallava script, on rock steles called prasasti. The prasasti found in and around Bogor differ in shape and text style from other Indonesian prasasti and are among the main attractions of the city.

From the 9th–15th centuries, the capital moved between Pakuan and other cities of the kingdom, and finally returned to Pakuan by King Siliwangi (Sri Baduga Maharaja) on 3 June 1482 – the day of his coronation. Since 1973, this date is celebrated in Bogor as an official city holiday.

In 1579, Pakuan was captured and almost completely destroyed by the army of the Sultanate of Banten, causing the existence of the State of Sunda to cease. The city was abandoned and remained uninhabited for decades.

=== Colonial period ===
==== Dutch East India Company ====
A Dutch map showing the location of the Pakuan Pajajaran relatively to Buitenzorg

In the second half of the 17th century, the abandoned Pakuan as with most of West Java, while formally remaining under the Sultanate of Banten, gradually passed under the control of the Dutch East India Company (VOC). The formal transition occurred on 17 April 1684 with a signed agreement between the Crown Prince of Banten and the VOC.

The first, and temporal, colonial settlement at Pakuan was a camp of lieutenant Tanoejiwa, a Sundanese employed by the VOC who was sent in 1687 to develop the area. It was seriously damaged by the eruption on 4–5 January 1699 of the Mount Salak volcano (Indonesian: Gunung Salak). However, the concomitant forest fires removed much forest, leaving much area for the planned rice and coffee plantations. In a short time, several agricultural settlements appeared around Pakuan, the largest being Kampung Baru (lit. "new village"). In 1701, they were combined into an administrative district; Tanoejiwa was chosen as the head of the district and is regarded as the founder of the modern Bogor Regency.

The district was further developed during the 1703 Dutch mission headed by the Inspector General of the VOC Abraham van Riebeeck (the son of the founder of Cape Town Jan van Riebeeck and later Governor of Dutch East Indies). The expedition of van Riebeeck performed a detailed study of the Pakuan ruins, discovered and described many archaeological artifacts, including prasasti, and erected buildings for the VOC employees. The area attracted the Dutch by a favorable geographical position and mild climate, preferred over the hot Batavia which was then the administrative center of the Dutch East Indies. In 1744–1745, the residence of the Governor-General was built in Pakuan which was hosting the government during the summer.

In 1746, by the order of the Governor-General Gustaaf Willem van Imhoff, the Palace, a nearby Dutch settlement and nine native settlements were merged into an administrative division named Buitenzorg (Dutch for "beyond (or outside) concerns", meaning "without worries" or "carefree", cf. Frederick the Great of Prussia's summer palace outside Potsdam, Sanssouci, with the same meaning in French). Around the same time, the first reference to Bogor as the local name of the city was documented; it was mentioned in the administration report from 7 April 1752 with respect to the part of Buitenzorg adjacent to the Palace. Later this name became used for the whole city as the local alternative to Buitenzorg. This name is believed to originate from the Javanese word bogor meaning sugar palm (Arenga pinnata) or bokor (a large bowl made from metal), which is still used in the Indonesian language. Alternative origins are the old-Javanese word bhagar (meaning cow), or simply the misspelling of "Buitenzorg" by the local residents.

The city grew rapidly in the late 18th – early 19th centuries. This growth was partly stimulated by the temporary occupation of the Dutch East Indies by the United Kingdom in 1811–1815 – the British landed on Java and other Sunda Islands to prevent their capture by Napoleonic France which then conquered the Netherlands. The head of the British administration Stamford Raffles moved the administrative center from Batavia to Buitenzorg and implemented new and more efficient management techniques.

==== Rule of the Kingdom of the Netherlands ====
Coat of Arms of Buitenzorg (now Bogor) during Dutch colonial era, granted in 1932

After Buitenzorg was returned to the Dutch, it fell under the rule of the Kingdom of the Netherlands rather than VOC. The Buitenzorg Palace was reinstated as the summer residence of the Governor-General. The surrounding territory was also organized into a new Residency, the Buitenzorg Residency. A botanical garden was set up nearby in 1817, which was one of the world's largest gardens in the 19th century.

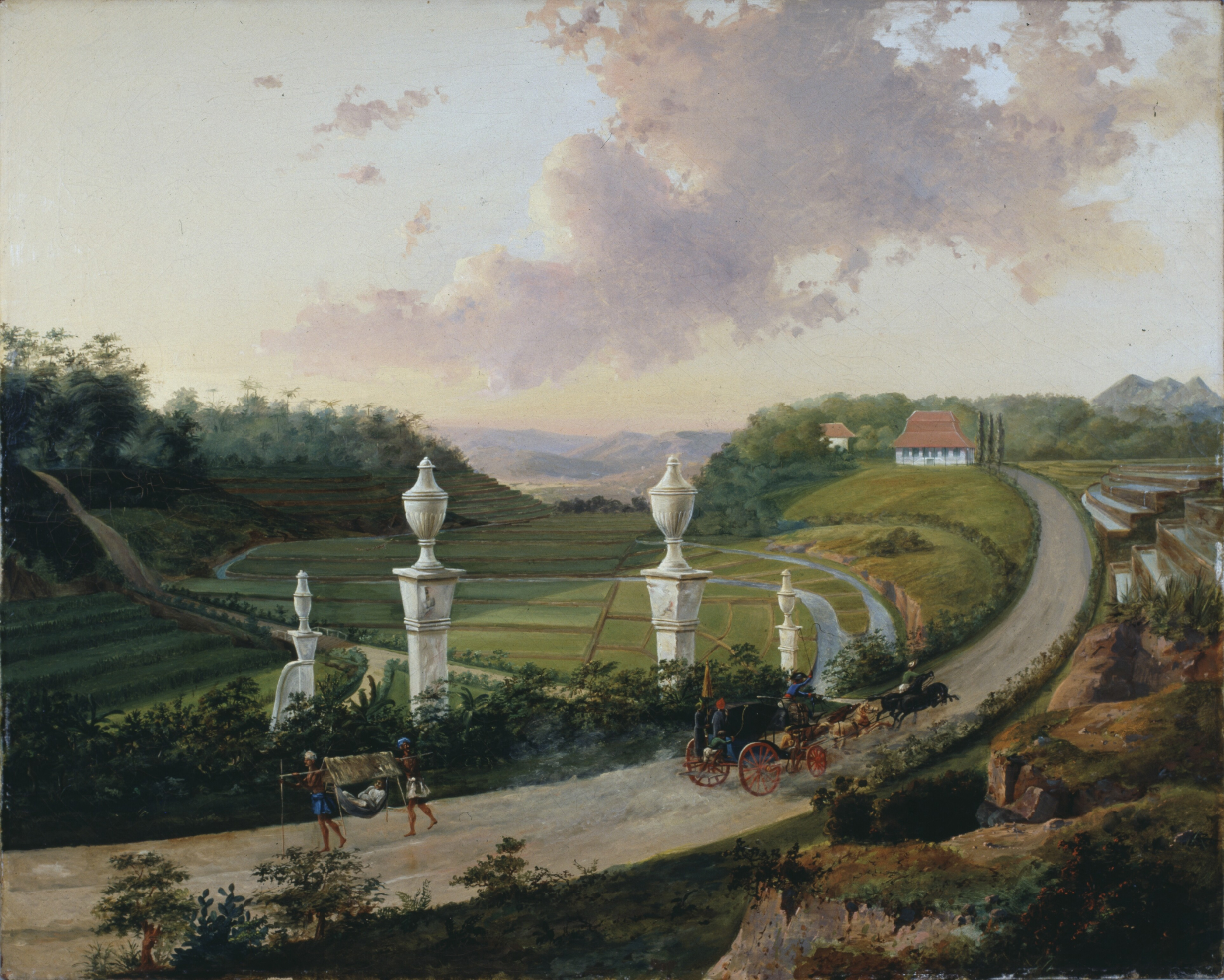
The Great Post Road passing Buitenzorg in the 19th century

On 10 October 1834, Buitenzorg was seriously damaged by another eruption of the Salak volcanoes caused by an earthquake. Taking into account the seismic activity of the region, the governor's palace and office buildings constructed in 1840–1850 were built shorter but sturdier than those built prior to the eruption. The Governor's decree of 1845 prescribed separate settlements of European, Chinese and Arab migrants within the city.

In 1860–1880, the largest agricultural school in the colony was established in Buitenzorg. Other scientific institutions including a city library, natural science museum, biology, chemistry, and veterinary medicine laboratories were also constructed during this period. During this time, in 1867, the Buitenzorg Residency was downgraded from a full Residency to an Assistant Residency. By the end of the 19th century, Buitenzorg became one of the most developed and westernized cities in Indonesia.

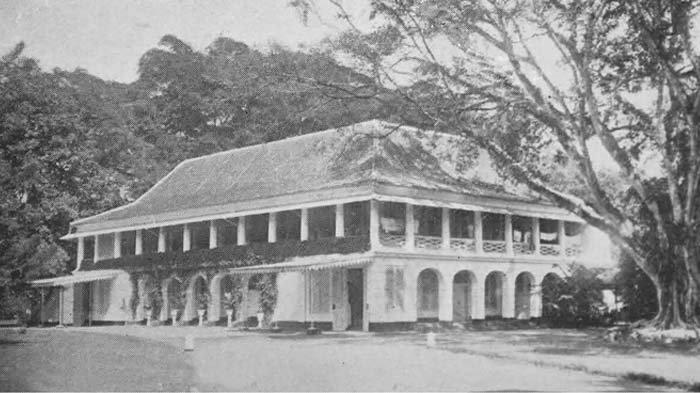
Resident Office Buitenzorg

In 1904, Buitenzorg formally became the administrative center of the Dutch East Indies. However, real management remained in Batavia, which hosted most of the administrative offices and the main office of the governor. This status was revoked in the administrative reform of 1924, which divided the colony into provinces and made Buitenzorg seat of the new Buitenzorg Residency and center of West Java Province.

=== 1942–1950 ===
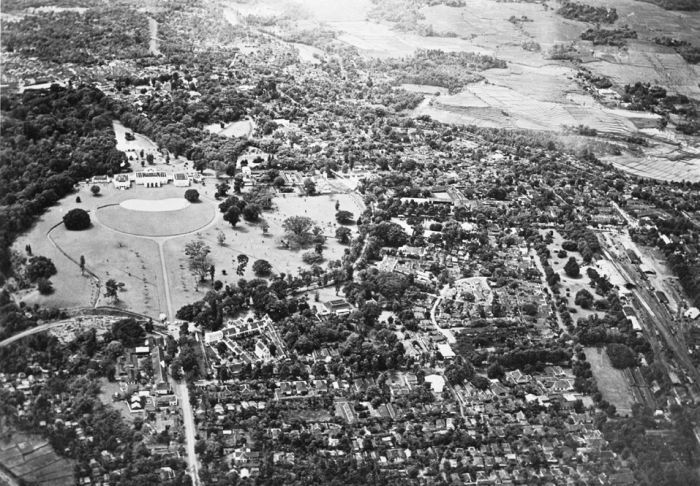
Aerial picture of Bogor during the 1930s

During World War II, Buitenzorg and the entire territory of the Dutch East Indies were occupied by Japanese forces; the occupation lasted from 6 March 1942 until the summer of 1945. As part of the efforts by the Japanese to promote nationalist (and thus anti-Dutch) sentiments among the local population the city was given the Indonesian name Bogor. The city had one of the major training centres of the Indonesian militia PETA (Pembela Tanah Air – "Defenders of the Motherland").

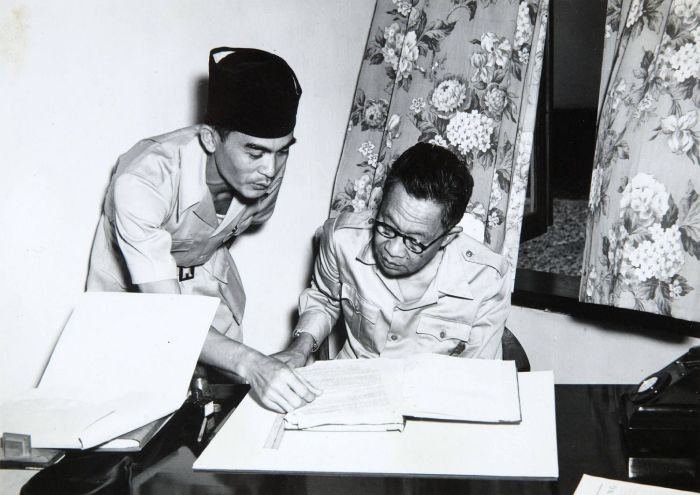
R. A. A. Muharram Wiranatakusuma, president of the Pasundan State with his secretary in Bogor (1948)

On 17 August 1945, Sukarno and Hatta proclaimed independence, but the Dutch regained control of the town and adjoining areas. In February 1948, Buitenzorg was included in the quasi-independent state of West Java,(Indonesian: Negara Jawa Barat) which was renamed Pasundan in April 1948 (Indonesian: Negara Pasundan). This state was established by the Netherlands as a step to transform their former colonial possessions in the East Indies into a dependent federation. In December 1949, Pasundan joined the Republic of the United States of Indonesia (Indonesian: Republik Indonesia Serikat, RIS) established at the Dutch–Indonesian Round Table Conference of 23 August – 2 November 1949. In February 1950, as a result of defeat of Pasundan in a quick military conflict with the Republic of Indonesia, the city became part of Indonesia, as formalized in August 1950, and its name was officially declared as Bogor.

=== Independence period ===
As part of independent modern Indonesia, Bogor has a significant role in the cultural, scientific, and economic development of the country and West Java in particular – in part due to the legacy of infrastructure built during the colonial period. Its special position was further reinforced by the transformation of the former summer residence of the governor-general into the summer palace of the President of Indonesia.

== Geography ==
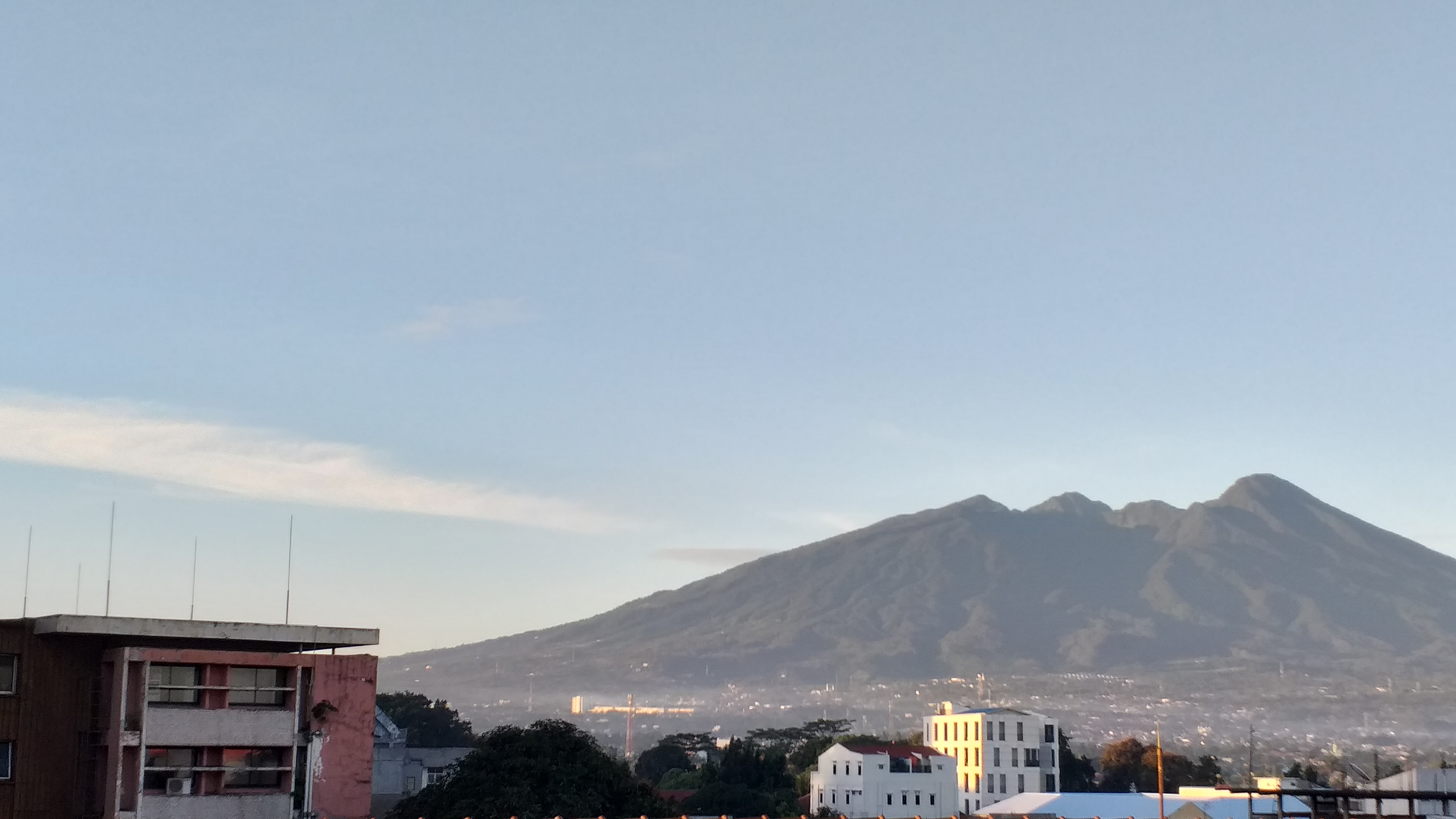
Bogor and Mount Salak

The city is situated in the western part of Java island, about 53 km south of the metropolis of Jakarta and 85 km northwest of the city of Bandung, the administrative center of West Java Province. Bogor spreads over a basin near the volcanoes of Salak (which peaks at about 12 km south) and Mount Gede (whose top is 22–25 km south-east of the city). The average elevation is 265 meters, maximum 330 m, and minimum 190 meters above sea level. The terrain is rather uneven: 17.64 km^{2} of its area has slopes of 0–2°, 80.9 km^{2} from 2° to 15°, 11 km^{2} between 15° and 25°, 7.65 km^{2} from 25° to 40° and 1.20 km^{2} over 40°; the northern part is relatively flat and the southern part is more hilly.

The soils are dominated by volcanic sedimentary rocks. Given the proximity of large active volcanoes, the area is considered highly seismic. The total area of green space is 205,000 m^{2}, of which 87,000 m^{2} are Bogor Botanical Gardens, 19,400 m^{2} are taken by 35 parks, 17,200 m^{2} by 24 groves and 81,400 m^{2} are covered with grass.

Several rivers flow through the city toward the Java Sea. The largest ones, Ciliwung and Cisadane, flank the historic city center. Smaller rivers, Cipakancilan, Cidepit, Ciparigi and Cibalok, are guided by cement tubes in many places. It is worth noting that "ci" in the river names merely means "river" in Sundanese, and the actual name begins after it, but the "ci" is nevertheless included in national and international maps. There are several small lakes within the city, including Situ Burung (lit. Bird Lake; "Situ" meaning "Lake") and Situ Gede (lit. Great Lake), each with an area of several hectares. Rivers and lakes occupy 2.89% of the city area.

=== Climate ===
Bogor has a tropical rainforest climate (Af) according to the Köppen climate classification. It is even more humid and rainy than many other areas of West Java – the average relative humidity is 70%, the average annual rainfall is more than 3,500 millimetres or 140 inches in some areas. The greatest rainfall occurs between December and February. Because of this weather, Bogor has the nickname "Rain City" (Indonesian: Kota hujan). Temperatures are lower than in coastal Java: the average maximum is 25.9 °C or 78.6 °F (cf. 32.2 °C or 90.0 °F in Jakarta). Daily fluctuations (9–10 °C or 16.2–18.0 °F) are rather high for Indonesia. The absolute maximum temperature was recorded at 38 °C (100.4 °F) and the minimum at 3 °C (37.4 °F).

Climate data for Bogor, West Java, Indonesia
Month	Jan	Feb	Mar	Apr	May	Jun	Jul	Aug	Sep	Oct	Nov	Dec	Year
Mean daily maximum °C (°F)	28.3 (82.9)	28.5 (83.3)	29.3 (84.7)	30.0 (86.0)	30.2 (86.4)	30.3 (86.5)	30.5 (86.9)	30.9 (87.6)	31.2 (88.2)	30.7 (87.3)	30.1 (86.2)	29.6 (85.3)	30.0 (86.0)
Daily mean °C (°F)	24.7 (76.5)	24.6 (76.3)	25.0 (77.0)	25.5 (77.9)	25.5 (77.9)	25.2 (77.4)	25.2 (77.4)	25.3 (77.5)	25.6 (78.1)	25.4 (77.7)	25.4 (77.7)	25.4 (77.7)	25.2 (77.4)
Mean daily minimum °C (°F)	21.1 (70.0)	20.8 (69.4)	20.7 (69.3)	21.0 (69.8)	20.8 (69.4)	20.2 (68.4)	19.9 (67.8)	19.7 (67.5)	20.0 (68.0)	20.2 (68.4)	20.7 (69.3)	21.3 (70.3)	20.5 (68.9)
Average precipitation mm (inches)	442 (17.4)	378 (14.9)	385 (15.2)	428 (16.9)	354 (13.9)	225 (8.9)	216 (8.5)	240 (9.4)	295 (11.6)	390 (15.4)	378 (14.9)	355 (14.0)	4,086 (161)
Source: Climate-Data.org

== Demographics ==
The New American Cyclopaedia of 1867 reported Buitenzorg's population as being 320,756, including 9,530 Chinese, 650 Europeans, and 23 Arabs.

Historical population
Year	Pop.	±%
1861	78,607	—
1930	65,427	−16.8%
1956	124,000	+89.5%
1961	154,092	+24.3%
1971	195,882	+27.1%
1980	246,946	+26.1%
1990	271,711	+10.0%
2000	750,819	+176.3%
2010	950,334	+26.6%
2020	1,043,070	+9.8%
2024	1,078,351	+3.4%
Source: * in 1995, there was an expansion of the city area

According to the national census held in May–August 2010, 949,066 people were registered in Bogor. The average population density was about 8,000 people per km^{2}; it reached 12,571 persons per km^{2} in the centre and drops to 5,866 people per km^{2} in the southern part. Based on official figures from Badan Pusat Statistik, the city's population as at mid 2024 was 1,078,351 people, giving a population density of 9,681 people per km^{2}.

The rapid population growth in Bogor after 1960 is related to urbanization as well as the influx of workforce from other parts of the country. The birth rate in 2009 was 563 children per 10,000 people, with the mortality value of 272. During the same year, 12,709 permanent resident moved in and 3,391 people left the city. Men constituted 51.06% and women 48.94% of the population; 28.39% of the inhabitants were under 15 years old, 67.42% were aged 15–65 years and 3.51% – over 65 years. The 2005 estimate of the life expectancy was 71.8 years, which is the highest figure for West Java and one of the highest in Indonesia.

According to 2000 Census, most of the population are Sundanese as native, with the largest immigrant minorities being Betawi, Javanese, Chinese, and other, often mixed ethnicities.

Religion Adherents in 2023
Islam	93.42%
Protestantism	3.80%
Catholic	1.95%
Buddhism	0.68%
Hinduism	0.11%
Confucianism	0.04%

The majority of population (93%) are Muslims with about 6% Christians. However, there are many Christian churches in the city, as well as Buddhist (mostly in the Chinese community) and Hindu communities.

Since 2008, a Christian church congregation in Bogor has been embroiled in conflict with Islamic fundamentalists over the building permit for their new church.

=== Language ===
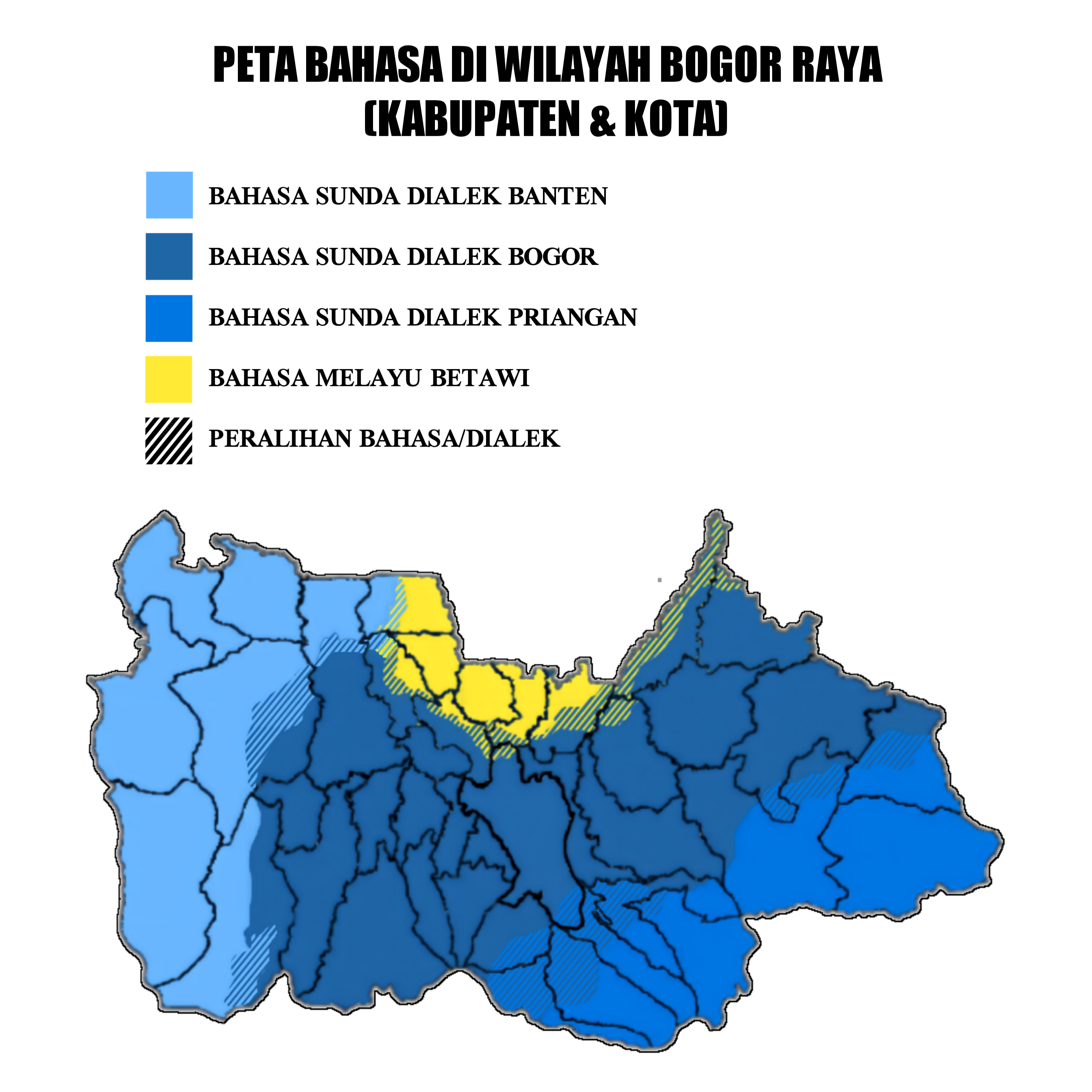
Languages and dialects distribution in the Greater Bogor area (city of Bogor is in the very center with a thick line).

The main language used in city of Bogor is Bogor Sundanese dialect and its use covers the entire area of city of Bogor. In the northern part, precisely in several sub-districts (kelurahan) within the Tanahsareal district, Sundanese and Betawi are used simultaneously and are considered a language shift area.

Language	Area of use
Sundanese (Bogor)	All sub-districts (kelurahan) in city of Bogor
Sundanese (Priangan)	East Bogor (Sindangrasa, Sindangsari) dan South Bogor (Bojongkerta, Harjasari, Kertamaya, Rancamaya)
Betawi	Tanahsareal (Cibadak, Kayumanis, Kencana, Mekarwangi, Sukadamai, Sukaresmi)

== Administrative districts ==
Bogor City is surrounded by the Bogor Regency (kabupaten) but in itself is a separate municipality (kota), making Bogor City an enclave within Bogor Regency. The city is divided into six districts (kecamatan), which contain 68 urban villages (kelurahan). The districts are tabulated below with their populations at the 2010 and 2020 Censuses, together with the official estimates at the end of 2023. The table also includes the number of administrative villages (all classed as urban kelurahan) in each district, and their post codes.

Kode Wilayah	English name	Indonesian name	Area in km^{2}	Pop'n at 2010 Census	Pop'n at 2020 Census	Pop'n at mid 2024 estimate	Pop'n Density mid 2024 (per km^{2})	Annual Growth rate 2020 – 2024	No. of Villages	Postal codes
32.71.01	South Bogor	Kecamatan Bogor Selatan	31.16	181,392	204,030	212,423	6,964	1.08%	16	16131–16139
36.71.02	East Bogor	Kecamatan Bogor Timur	10.75	95,098	104,327	107,573	10,280	0.82%	6	16141–16146
32.71.03	Central Bogor	Kecamatan Bogor Tengah	8.11	101,398	96,258	95,758	11,445	-0.14%	11	16121–16129
32.71.04	West Bogor	Kecamatan Bogor Barat	23.08	211,084	233,637	241,738	10,368	0.91%	16	16111–16119
32.71.05	North Bogor	Kecamatan Bogor Utara	18.88	170,443	186,724	192,430	10,610	0.81%	8	16151–16158
32.71.06	Tanah Sareal	Kecamatan Tanah Sareal	21.25	190,919	218,094	228,429	11,089	1.24%	11	16161–16169

=== Administration ===
The city is headed by a mayor, who is elected by the citizens every five years, together with a vice-mayor; in the past, the mayor was appointed by the provincial administration. Diani Budiarto became the first directly elected mayor of Bogor on 25 October 2008 and assumed his position on 7 April 2009. Legislative power is provided by the Bogor City Regional House of Representatives which consists of 50 directly elected members serving 5-year terms. The Coat of arms of Bogor is a rectangular heraldic shield with a pointed base and the side lengths ratio of 5:4, divided by a cross into four parts. The upper left quarter contains the National emblem of Indonesia – the mythical bird Garuda, in the upper right is the presidential palace, in the bottom left is the Salak volcano, and in the lower right is the national Sundanese dagger kujang. The inscription on top reads "KOTA BOGOR", which translates to "THE CITY OF BOGOR".

== Economy ==
Bogor has developed automotive, chemical, and food industries; its outlying areas are used for agriculture. During the colonization, Bogor was mostly producing coffee, rubber and high-quality timber. Chemical industry was introduced to the city at the end of the 19th century, and car and metal production in the 1950s, during the industrialization of independent Indonesia. The fast economic development of the 1980s was slowed down by the crisis of the 1990s and recovered in the early 2000s; so the growth rate of the economy in Bogor was 5.78% in 2002, 6.07% in 2003 and 6.02% in 2009. At the end of 2009, the Gross Regional Product (GRP) was 12.249 trillion IDR (approximately US$1.287 billion) and the investments amounted to 932.295 billion IDR.

Despite the economic growth, the number of citizens living below the poverty level (defined by not only income, but also access to basic social services) is increasing, primarily due to the inflow of poor residents from the surrounding rural areas. In 2009, 17.45% of the population lived below the poverty level, almost twice as high than in 2006 (9.5%) Minimum wage is established by the West Java Governor at 2,658,155 IDR/month.

Branch of economy	Share in GRP (%)
Trade, hotel and restaurant business	30.14
Industry	28.2
Financial services	13.77
Transport and communication	9.7
Customer services	7.54
Construction	7.48
Energy and water supply	3.16
Agriculture, fishing	0.36

In 2008 there were 3,208 officially registered industrial enterprises in Bogor employing 54,268 people, more than half (32,237) of whom worked at the 114 largest companies. The outskirts of the city contain about 3,466 hectares of agricultural area, including 111 hectares of water bodies used for fishery and fish farming. The main crops are rice (1165 hectares as of 2007, the annual harvest in 2003 was 9,953 tonnes), various vegetables (772 acres, 8,296 tonnes), corn (382 acres, 6,720 tonnes) and sweet potato (480 acres, 3,480 tonnes). The livestock sector has 25 registered companies (as of 2007) mostly breeding cows (more than 1000 animals yielding more than 2.61 million liters of milk), sheep (about 12,000), chickens (more than 642,000) and ducks (ca. 8,000).

About 25–30 tonnes of various species of fish are produced per year by 4 registered companies. The fishes are mostly bred artificially, in ponds and paddy fields. Breeding aquarium fish and also catching them in their natural habitat is an important industry sector, which yielded US$367,000 from 2008 export sales only, mostly to Japan and Middle East. A substantial part of other Bogor production, 144 billion IDR in 2008, is exported. Examples are clothes and footwear (to US, EU, ASEAN, Canada, Australia, Russia), textiles (US, New Zealand), furniture (South Korea), car tires (ASEAN countries and South America), toys and souvenirs (Japan, Germany, Brazil), soft drinks (ASEAN countries and Middle East). Most of the local sells are carried out via the eight major shopping centers, nine supermarkets and seven major markets.

=== Tourism ===
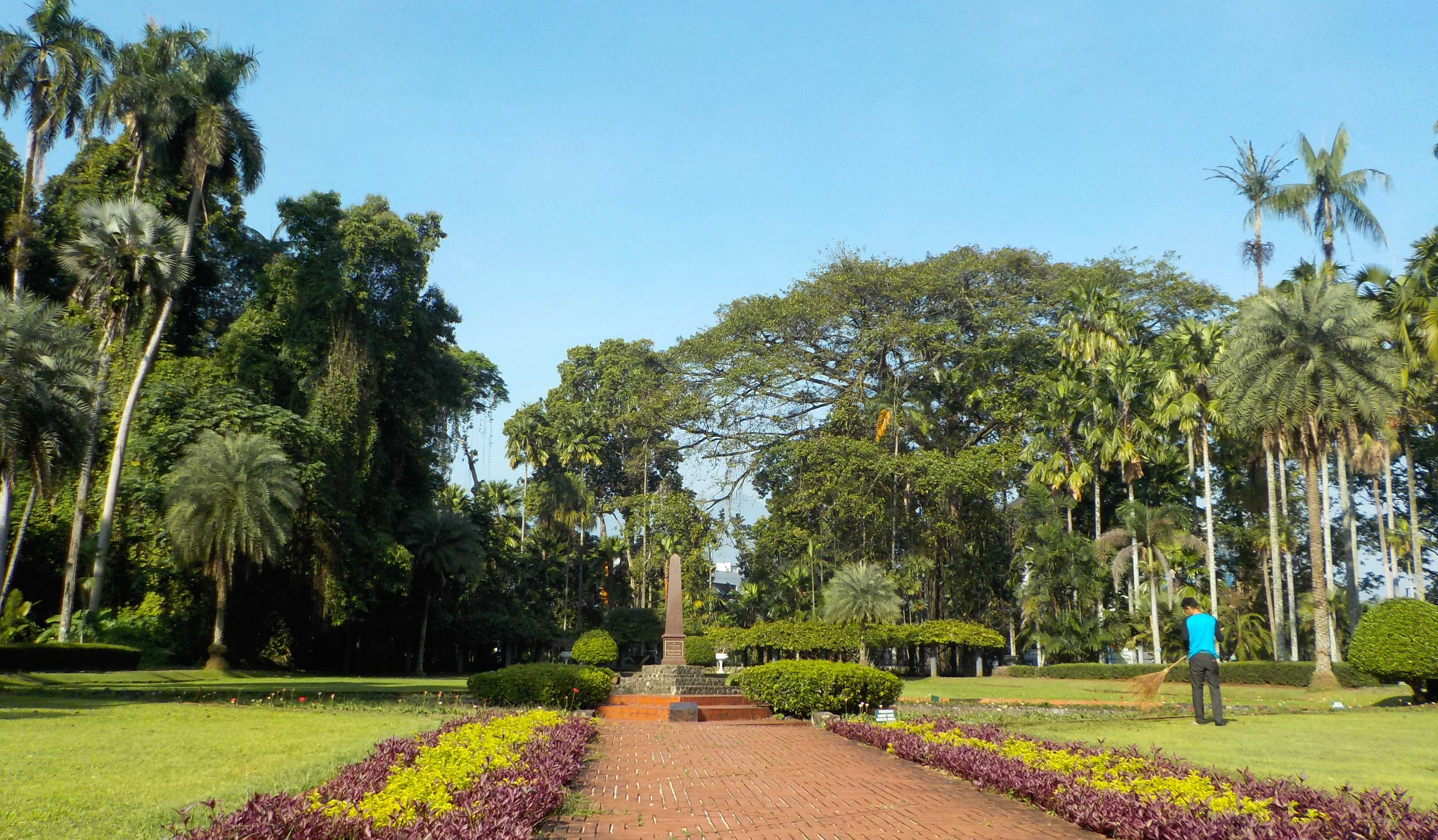
Teijsmann Garden in the Bogor Botanical Garden

At a national tourism exhibition of 2010 in Jakarta, Bogor was recognized as the most attractive tourist city in Indonesia. The city and its surrounding area are visited by about 1.8 million people per year, of whom more than 60,000 are foreigners.

The main tourist attraction is the Bogor Botanical Garden. Founded in 1817, it contains more than 6,000 species of tropical plants. Besides, about 42 bird species breed within the garden, although this number is declining and was 62 before 1952. The garden's 87-hectare area within the city was supplemented in 1866 by a 120-hectare park in suburban town of Cibodas. Much of the original rainforest was preserved within the garden providing specimens for scientific studies. The garden was also enriched by collections of palms, bamboos, cacti, orchids and ornamental trees. It became famous in the late 19th century and was visited by naturalists from abroad to conduct scientific research. For example, the Russian St. Petersburg Academy of Sciences had a Buitenzorg scholarship for young scientists to work at Bogor.

On the grounds of the botanic garden, there is a cemetery established in 1784. It contains 42 historical graves of the Dutch colonial officials, military officers, and scientists, who served in Bogor, Jakarta, and other cities in West Java from the late 18th to early 20th centuries. Nearby, there are three graves from the early Sunda Kingdom (15th century): the wife of the founder of Bogor Siliwangi, Galuh Mangku Alam, vizier Ba'ul, and commander Japra. The locals regard these individuals as the city's patrons. The staff of Bogor garden also administer three other major gardens of Indonesia: the Cibodas Botanical Garden founded 1862 in West Java, the Purwodadi Botanical Garden in East Java and the Bali Botanic Garden founded in 1959 on Bali island.

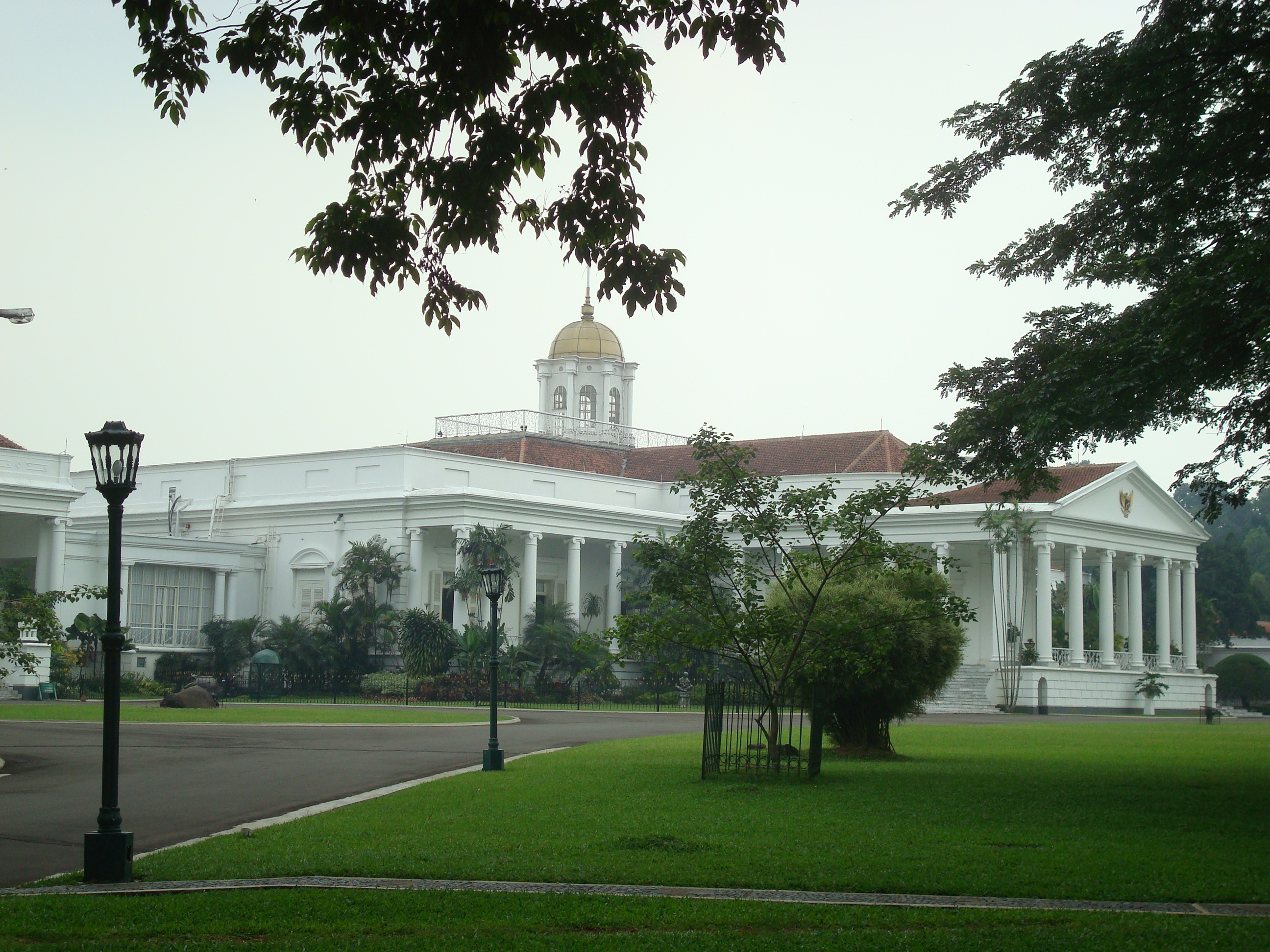
The former residence of the Governor-General, now the summer palace of the President of Indonesia

Another tourist attraction is the presidential palace with the total area of 28 hectares, including 1.8492 hectares of the palace buildings. The palace is surrounded by a park with a small pond. The park is home to a herd of tame deer and is open to the public most of the year. The palace is accessible during holidays, such as the City Day and Independence Day; it has a collection of 450 paintings and 360 sculptures.

Bogor was the capital of the Sundanese kingdom in the Middle Ages. Sundanese culture dominates as in other areas of West Java. The city and its suburbs contain dozens of medieval stone stelae (prasasti). Fifteen inscriptions of the greatest historical and cultural value are collected in a special museum, one of which is the Batutulis inscription. In the southern part of Bogor city there is the tomb of Raden Saleh, a famous 19th-century Dutch East Indies painter and in the western part of Bogor city there is a large lake Gede (area 6 hectares) surrounded by protected forest areas and forest parks. In the protected area there are several research facilities, and recreational areas host sports, boating, and fishing activities.

Bogor is one of the leading cities of Indonesia by the number of museums, some of which are among the oldest and largest in the country. The Zoological Museum (Indonesian: Museum Zoologi) which was opened in 1894 by the Dutch colonial administration as an adjunct to the Botanic Gardens and contains thousands of exhibits. Other prominent museums are more recent. The museum of ethnobotany (Indonesian: Museum Etnobotani) was opened in 1982 and has more than 2000 exhibits; the museum of the earth (Indonesian: Museum Tanah, 1988) displays hundreds of soil and rock samples from different parts of Indonesia; the museum of the struggle (Indonesian: Museum Perjuangan, 1957) is devoted to the history of the Indonesian national liberation movement; and Pembela Tanah Air Museum (1996) reflects the history of the Indonesian military militia PETA (Pembela Tanah Air – "Defenders of the Motherland") created during World War II by the Japanese occupation administration.

Other historical places are Bogor Cathedral – built in 1750, it is one of the oldest operational Catholic churches in Indonesia, and the Buddhist temple Hok Tek Bio, built in 1672 in the classical southern Chinese style. It is the first Buddhist temple in Bogor and one of the oldest in Indonesia. The Jaksa Waterfall is located near the city. It is located within a picturesque lowland rainforest setting.

The city has a drama theater, dozens of movie theaters, nine of which (as of mid-2010) are built to international standards. The presidential palace, administrative buildings, and universities regularly host art exhibitions, and there are regular festivals of folk art, conferences, and culture-related seminars, such as the Congress of Indonesian culture (Indonesian: Kongres Kebudayaan Indonesia) of 2008. Besides all the tourist attractions above, Bogor also offers a variety of shopping malls or stores including Botani Square, Bogor Trade Mall, Lippo Plaza, Plaza Indah Bogor, etc.

Bogor launched a bus service that can go around the city of Bogor called Transpakuan which starts their tour at Bogor Botanical Gardens. The bus route will start from Alun-alun Botani and end at the same place. This service was inaugurated by Bogor Mayor Bima Arya on 1 January 2017. This bus is called UNCAL, which means "Unforgettable City Tour in a Fun City".

== Transport ==
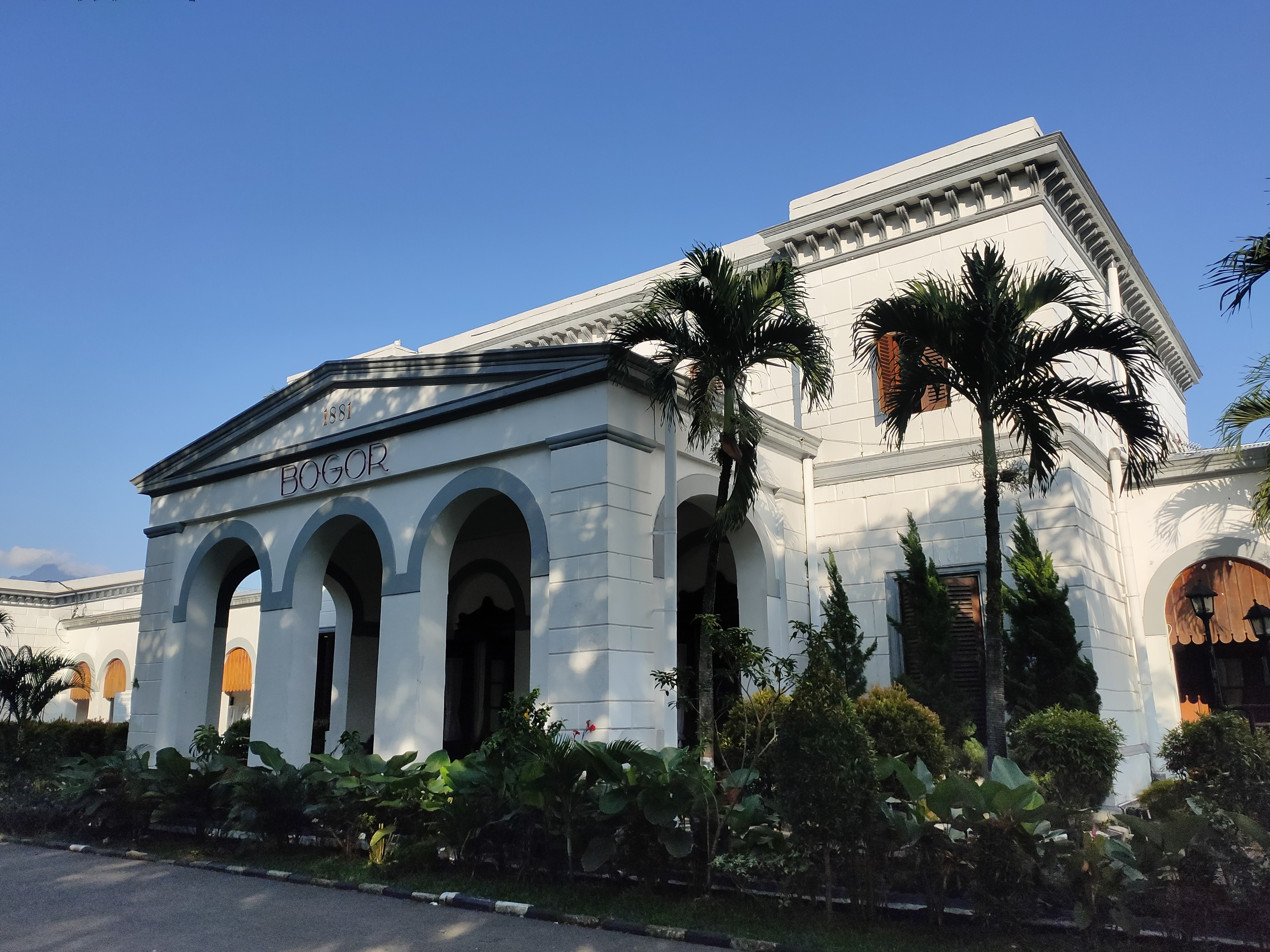
Facade of Bogor Station

Bogor is a major transport center of Java. It contains 599.2 kilometers of roads (as of 2008) which cover 5.31% of the city area; 30.2 kilometers of the roads are of national and 26.8 km of prefectural importance. The 22 transport lines are operated by 3,506 buses and minibuses. In addition, 10 bus routes connect the city with the nearest metropolitan area (4,612 buses) and 40 with other cities of West Java (330 buses).

There are two major bus terminals, Baranangsiang and Bubulak. The former has an area of 22,100 m^{2} and is dedicated to long-distance and freight traffic while the latter (area 11,850 m^{2}) serves urban passenger routes. A separate station is dedicated to tourist coaches and buses to the nearest Soekarno–Hatta International Airport in Jakarta, located about 55 kilometers from Bogor. Recent years have seen a significant increase in the number of traditional Indonesian rickshaw (becak) at more than 2,000 units as of 2009. The Bogor railway station was built in 1881, and currently serves about 50,000 passengers and has about 70 departures and 70 arrivals per day. The Bogor Paledang railway station opened in 2013 to serve trains to Sukabumi.

== Healthcare ==
The first hospitals were established in Bogor in the first half of the 19th century by the Dutch authorities. By the early 20th century, there were several civilian hospitals, a military hospital, and a large psychiatric hospital with doctors from Europe and North America. In the 1930s, the Dutch Red Cross Society hospital became the largest in the city. Most of the existing hospitals and clinics were built in the 1980s–1990s. They include 10 hospitals, 373 private clinics, 51 single-doctor clinics, and 134 pharmacies and drug stores, and employ 274 general practitioners, 122 dentists, 74 sanitation doctors, 37 radiologists (X-ray), 141 gynaecologists, 32 nutritionists, 55 assistants, 710 nurses, 63 pharmacists, and 99 doctors of other specialties. 2 new hospitals are founded in 2014. Bogor has been a thriving city and it reflects on the increasing number of hospitals available. As of 2024, there are 25 hospitals available in Bogor alone.

The 25 hospitals of Bogor are:

1. Hospital of the Indonesian Red Cross Society (Indonesian: Rumah Sakit Palang Merah Indonesia) – general, the oldest in the city
2. General Hospital of Bogor City (Indonesian: Rumah Sakit Umum Daerah Kota Bogor) – general, owned by the city government, formerly Karya Bhakti
3. Salak (Indonesian: Rumah Sakit Salak) – general, owned by the Indonesian Army
4. Atang Sanjaya (Indonesian: Rumah Sakit TNI AU Atang Sanjaya) – general, owned by the Indonesian Air Force, located in airbase area
5. Bogor Medical Centre – general practitioners, private
6. Islamic Hospital (Indonesian: Rumah Sakit Islam) – general
7. Azra (Indonesian: Rumah Sakit Azra) – general
8. Melania (Indonesian: Rumah Sakit Melania) – women and children
9. Hermina (Indonesian: Rumah Sakit Hermina) – women and children
10. Marzuki Mahdi (Indonesian: Rumah Sakit Marzuki Mahdi) – infectious diseases and psychiatric hospital
11. Mulia (Indonesian: Rumah Sakit Mulia)- general
12. Vania (Indonesian: Rumah Sakit Vania)- general, founded on 1 November 2014
13. BMC (Indonesian: Rumah Sakit Bogor Medical Center)- general
14. EMC Sentul City(Indonesian: Rumah Sakit EMC)- general
15. UMMI (Indonesian: Rumah Sakit UMMI) – general
16. Nuraida (Indonesian: Rumah Sakit Ibu dan Anak Nuraida) – women and children
17. Bina Husada (Indonesian: Rumah Sakit Bina Husada Cibinong) – general
18. Bogor Senior Hospital – general
19. Graha Merdika (Indonesian: Rumah Sakit Graha Merdika Bogor) – general
20. Bunda Suryatni (Indonesian: Rumah Sakit Bunda Suryatni) – women and children
21. Ibu dan Anak (Indonesian: Rumah Sakit Ibu dan Anak) – women and children
22. Juliana (Indonesian: Rumah Sakit Juliana) – general
23. RSKIA Sawojajar – women and children
24. Medika (Indonesian: Rumah Sakit Umum Medika Dramaga) – general

== Culture ==
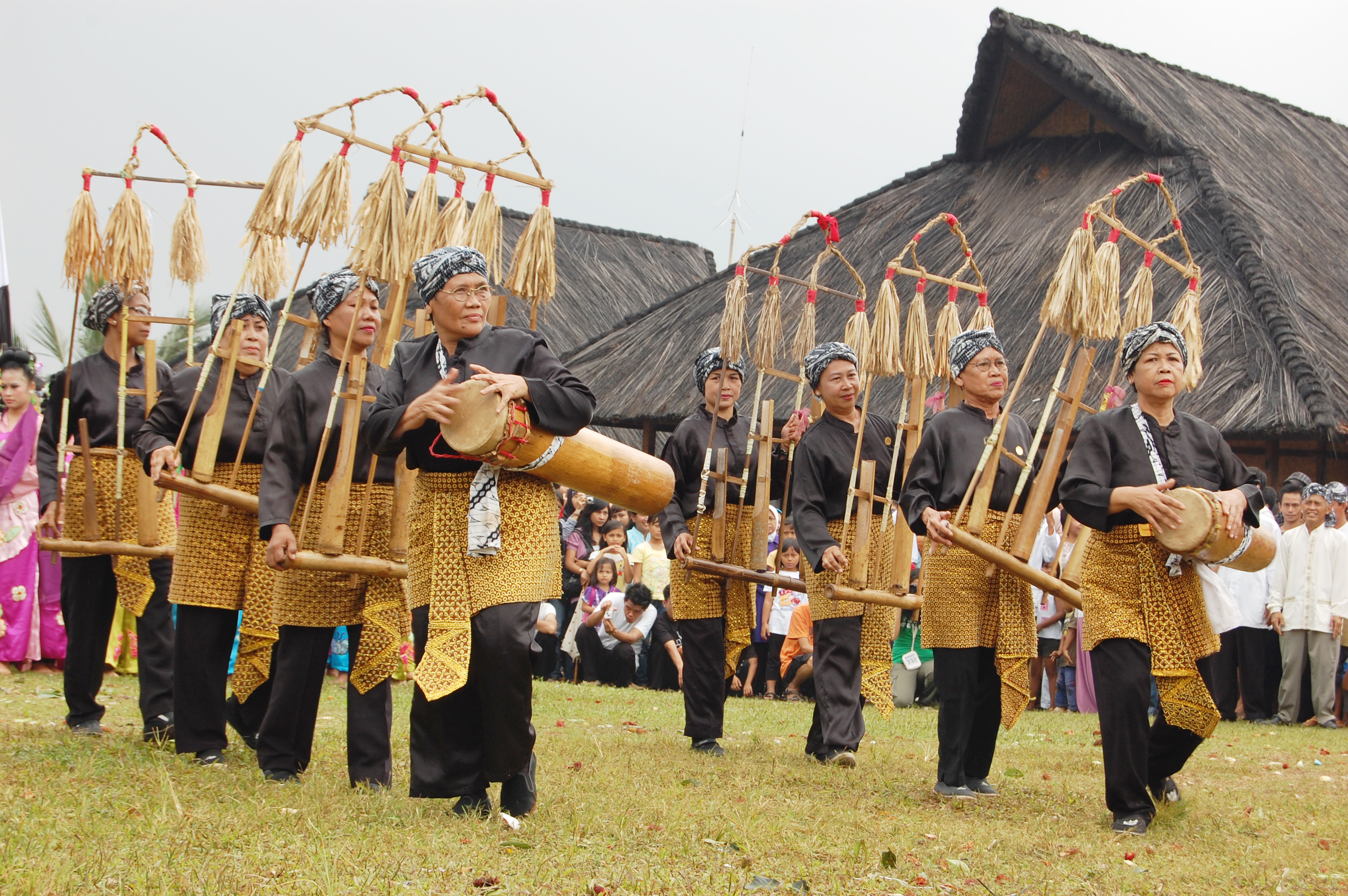
Seren Taun is a Sundanese festival tradition that expresses gratitude to God for an abundant rice harvest.

Bogor is renowned for its rich Sundanese history (like Pakuan Pajajaran) and cultural heritage. A diverse range of arts, music, cuisine, and local traditions remain vibrant and vibrant there. The majority of Bogor's residents are ethnically Sundanese, so they use a distinctive Bogor Sundanese dialect in their daily lives. For example, authentic Bogor Sundanese does not use the undak-usuk (level of formality) system of speech levels found in other Priangan regions.

Bogor traditional arts include unique dances and music. Typical dances such as Parebut seeng, is a martial arts performed by Sundanese men to show their intention to propose to someone and Angklung Gubrag, a traditional bamboo musical instrument that's still preserved and often played in agricultural rituals, particularly rice harvest ceremonies to honor Dewi Sri.

=== Culinary ===
The typical cuisine of Bogor is soto mie bogor, a kind of soup made from noodles and vermicelli, cabbage, tomatoes, (cartilage and beef tendons) and tripe, spring roll risoles, served in broth, added with sweet soy sauce, sprinkled with fried onions and chili sauce, Asinan is a kind of preserved vegetable or fruit salad from the many types and variations of pickles in Indonesia, the most popular are pickled vegetables and pickled fruit. and many more types, for example Toge goreng and rujak.

There are two culinary centers in the city of Bogor, the first near the Bogor City Square or better known as Alun-alun kota bogor which is a city park which is a gathering place for city residents to carry out social, cultural, and recreational activities. The Bogor City Square was inaugurated by the Bogor City Government on Friday, 17 December 2021 and the second is on Suryakencana Street, this street is a Chinatown area, visitors will find houses of native Chinese residents and buildings from ancient times because this area has indeed functioned as a commercial area since the Dutch colonial era.

=== Media ===
Bogor has three daily Indonesian-language newspapers – Radar Bogor, founded in 1998, Pakuan Raya founded in 2005 and Jurnal Bogor, founded in 2008. they print in about 25,000 copies and have electronic versions. Bogor offices also partly print part some Sundanese and national newspapers. There are a few magazines and scientific publications of the local universities.

The two municipal TV channels, Bogor TV and Megaswara TV, broadcast at UHF channel 25 over the city and nearby areas of West Java. There are also at least 30 local radio stations, of which 20 are in the FM and 10 in the AM range.

=== Sport ===
As of March 2010, the Bogor teams were registered in 28 sports to participate in national and regional competitions conducted by the National Sports Committee of Indonesia (Indonesian: Komite Nasional Olahraga Indonesia). At the Java competitions, Bogor athletes took 5 gold medals instead of the planned 42. The largest among 15 sports organizations is the Bogor Football Union (Indonesian: Persatuan Sepakbola Bogor), headed by the current Mayor Diani Budiarto. The local football team "PSB Bogor" has never won in the national championships. The local Stadium Pajajaran can accommodate 25,000 spectators.

== Education ==
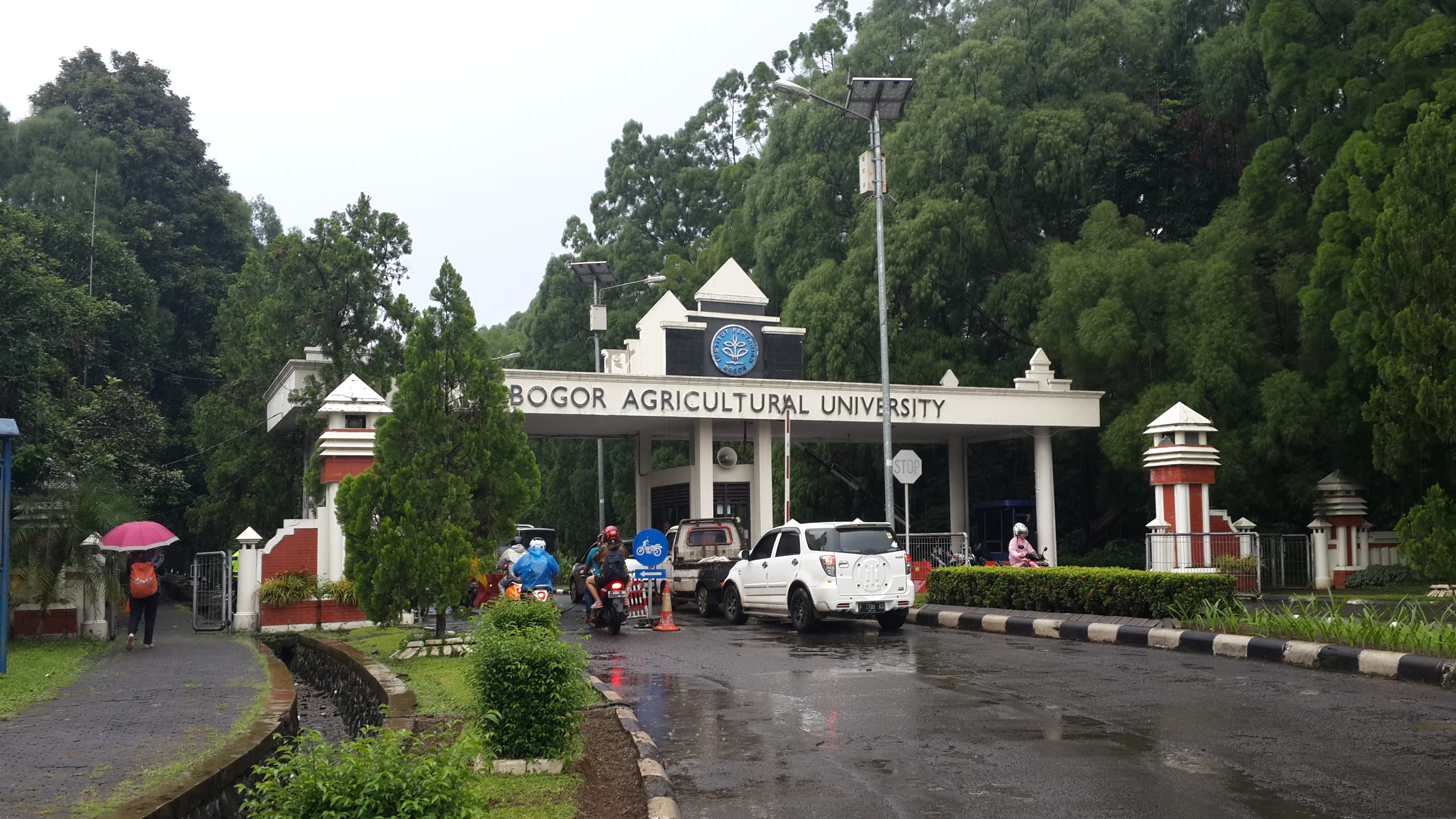
Bogor Agricultural University campus gate

Bogor is one of the major scientific and educational centers in Indonesia. A significant part of academic and research base was laid in the period of Dutch colonization. In particular, since the beginning of the 19th century, there were established laboratories and professional schools focused primarily on improving the efficiency of colonial agriculture. In the late 19th – early 20th centuries major scientific institutions were established – the Research Institute and Rubber Research Institute of Forest.

The prevailing profile of research and academic activity was retained in Bogor Indonesia after gaining independence. As in the second half of the 20th century, in the 2000s the strongest areas were agricultural, biology, and veterinary sciences. The main educational and scientific center with the utmost national importance is IPB University, which in addition to educational facilities, includes dozens of research centers and laboratories.

Bogor hosts the global headquarters of the Center for International Forestry Research (CIFOR), an international organization conducting research on forestry and human development. The headquarters of the Organisation for the Preservation of Birds and their Habitat are also in Bogor.

Education	Percentage of the population
Less than 6 classes	24.3
Elementary school (grades 1–6)	29.3
Secondary school (grades 7–9)	16
High schools (grades 10–12)	23.2
Bachelor	3.1
Master and above	4.1

Educational institutions of Bogor
Type	Number of institutions (public/private)	Number of students	Number of teachers
Kindergartens	154 (1/153)	7,194 (175/7,019)	765 (11/754)
Schools for handicap children	9 (0/9)	408 (0/408)	78 (0/78)
Elementary schools	288 (248/40)	97,794 (84,289/13,505)	5,004 (4,267/737)
Secondary schools	115 (19/96)	43,153 (18,867/24,286)	2,634 (892/1,742)
High schools	50 (10/40)	22,349 (9,450/12,899)	1558 (566/992)
Technical schools	63 (no data)	28,375 (3,334/25,041)	1826 (246/1,580)
Universities	15 (5/10)	16,998 (12,304/4,694)	1,787 (1,225/562)

The literacy rate in Bogor (98.7%) is relatively high for Indonesia. IPB University (Indonesian: Institut Pertanian Bogor) is the main agricultural university of the country. It was founded in 1963 based on the agricultural college, which was established back in the 19th century by the Dutch colonial administration. The largest private universities are Pakuan, Juanda, Nusa Bangsa and Ibn Khaldun. In addition to regular schools, there are over 700 Muslim schools (madrasah) and several Christian schools and colleges.

Most scientific research in Bogor is carried out in agriculture, soil science, dendrology, veterinary and ichthyology. More specific areas include natural pesticides and repellents, intercropping, industrial applications of essential oils and natural alkaloids, increasing yields of various kinds of pepper, improving preservation processes, etc.

== Sister cities ==
- Gödöllő, Hungary
- Kisarazu, Japan
- Nanning, China
- St. Louis, United States

== See also ==
- Bogor Regency
- Buitenzorg Residency
- Pakuan Pajajaran
- Sunda Kingdom
- Tarumanagara Kingdom
