= West Bogor =

West Bogor Bogor Barat
- District
- Location within Indonesia
- Country: Indonesia
- Province: West Java
- City: Bogor

Government
  - Head of District (Camat): Dudi Fitri Susandi

Area
  - Total: 23.08 km^{2} (8.91 sq mi)

Population (mid 2023 estimate)
  - Total: 254,629
  - Density: 11,032/km^{2} (28,570/sq mi)
- Time zone: UTC+7 (IWST)
- Area code: (+62) 251
- Vehicle registration: F
- Villages: 16
- Office: Loji
- Website: kecbogorbarat.kotabogor.go.id

West Bogor (Indonesian: Bogor Barat, Sundanese: ᮘᮧᮌᮧᮁ ᮊᮥᮜᮧᮔ᮪, romanized: Bogor Kulon) is one of the six administrative districts (kecamatan) in the city of Bogor, West Java Province, Indonesia. The district covers an area of 23.08 km^{2}, and had a population of 211,084 at the 2010 Census and 233,637 at the 2020 Census; the official estimate as at mid 2023 was 254,629. Administratively it is divided into sixteen villages (kelurahan).

== Demography ==
=== Religion ===
Religion Adherents in 2022
Islam	96.31%
Protestantism	2.23%
Catholic	1.05%
Buddhism	0.27%
Hinduism	0.11%
Confucianism	0.03%
Other Religion (Sunda Wiwitan, etc)	0.01%

== Administrative division ==
=== Urban villages ===
Kode Wilayah	English name	Indonesian name	Area in km^{2}	Population (2024)	Density (per Km^{2})	Annual Growth Rate (%)	Post code
32.71.04.1001	Menteng	Kelurahan Menteng	2.18	18,208	8,352	0.39	16111
32.71.04.1005	Balumbangjaya	Kelurahan Balumbangjaya	1.46	13,621	9,329	1.97	16116
32.71.04.1006	Situgede	Kelurahan Situgede	2.35	12,504	5,321	1.84	16115
32.71.04.1007	Semplak	Kelurahan Semplak	1.03	13,359	12,970	1.51	16114
32.71.04.1008	West Cilendek	Kelurahan Cilendek Barat	1.67	20,762	12,432	0.51	16112
32.71.04.1009	East Cilendek	Kelurahan Cilendek Timur	1.22	19,413	15,912	1.17	16112
32.71.04.1010	Curug Mekar	Kelurahan Curug Mekar	1.30	13,869	10,668	0.88	16113
32.71.04.1011	Curug	Kelurahan Curug	1.29	13,798	10,696	1.32	16113
Totals			12.50	125,534	10,043	1.12	

=== New urban villages ===
Kode Wilayah	English name	Indonesian name	Area in km^{2}	Population (2024)	Density (per Km^{2})	Annual Growth Rate (%)	Post code
32.71.04.1002	Sindangbarang	Kelurahan Sindangbarang	1.92	20,477	10,665	1.17	16117
32.71.04.1003	Bubulak	Kelurahan Bubulak	1.95	18,644	9,561	1.80	16115
32.71.04.1004	Margajaya	Kelurahan Margajaya	1.02	7,220	7,078	1.91	16116
32.71.04.1012	Pasirjaya	Kelurahan Pasirjaya	1.43	22,835	15,969	1.13	16119
32.71.04.1013	Pasirkuda	Kelurahan Pasirkuda	1.39	16,915	12,169	0.46	16119
32.71.04.1014	Pasirmulya	Kelurahan Pasirmulya	1.35	6,219	4,607	0.84	16118
32.71.04.1015	Gunungbatu	Kelurahan Gunungbatu	1.05	22,103	21,050	0.64	16118
32.71.04.1016	Loji	Kelurahan Loji	1.27	16,912	13,317	1.64	16117
Totals			11.38	131,325	11,540	1.16	

== Urban villages ==
English name	Indonesian name	Area in km^{2}	Population mid 2022 estimate	Density 2022 (per/Km²)	Post code
