= South Bogor =

South Bogor Bogor Selatan
- District
- Location within Java Location within Indonesia
- Coordinates: 6°38′19″S 106°48′54″E
- Country: Indonesia
- Province: West Java
- City: Bogor

Government
  - Head of District (Camat): Abdul Rahman

Area
  - Total: 30.50 km^{2} (11.78 sq mi)

Population (2022)
  - Total: 216,501
  - Density: 7,098/km^{2} (18,380/sq mi)
- Time zone: UTC+7 (IWST)
- Area code: (+62) 251
- Vehicle registration: F
- Villages: 16
- Website: kecbogorselatan.kotabogor.go.id

South Bogor (Indonesian: Bogor Selatan, Sundanese: ᮘᮧᮌᮧᮁ ᮊᮤᮓᮥᮜ᮪, romanized: Bogor Kidul) is one of the six administrative districts (kecamatan) in the city of Bogor, West Java Province, Indonesia. The district covers an area of 31.16 km^{2}, and had a population of 181,392 at the 2010 Census and 204,030 at the 2020 Census; the official estimate as at mid 2023 was 219,309. Administratively it is divided into sixteen villages (kelurahan).

== Demographics ==
=== Religion ===
Religion Adherents in 2022
Islam	92.60%
Protestantism	4.13%
Catholic	2.15%
Buddhism	1.02%
Hinduism	0.05%
Confucianism	0.05%
Other Religion (Sunda Wiwitan, etc)	0.00%

== Administrative divisions ==
=== Urban villages ===
Kode Wilayah	English name	Indonesian name	Area in km^{2}	Population mid 2022 estimate	Density 2022 (per/Km²)	Post code
32.71.01.1001	Batutulis Village	Kelurahan Batutulis	0.69	10,661	15,451	16133
32.71.01.1002	Bondongan Village	Kelurahan Bondongan	0.59	14,954	25,346	16131
32.71.01.1003	Empang Village	Kelurahan Empang	0.94	18,391	19,565	16132
32.71.01.1004	Lawanggintung Village	Kelurahan Lawanggintung	0.64	8,753	13,677	16134
32.71.01.1005	Pamoyanan Village	Kelurahan Pamoyanan	2.66	17,286	6,499	16136
32.71.01.1006	Ranggamekar Village	Kelurahan Ranggamekar	1.66	16,156	9,733	16136
32.71.01.1007	Mulyaharja Village	Kelurahan Mulyaharja	5.54	23,709	4,280	16135
32.71.01.1008	Cikaret Village	Kelurahan Cikaret	1.40	22,041	15,744	16132
Totals South Bogor District			14.12	131,951	9,345	

Kode Wilayah	English name	Indonesian name	Area in km^{2}	Population mid 2022 estimate	Density 2022 (per/Km²)	Post code
32.71.01.1009	Bojongkerta Village	Kelurahan Bojongkerta	2.48	11,203	4,517	16139
32.71.01.1010	Rancamaya Village	Kelurahan Rancamaya	1.91	7,954	4,164	16139
32.71.01.1011	Kertamaya Village	Kelurahan Kertamaya	4.54	7,155	1,576	16138
32.71.01.1012	Harjasari Village	Kelurahan Harjasari	1.54	14,117	9,167	16138
32.71.01.1013	Muarasari Village	Kelurahan Muarasari	1.70	11,651	6,854	16137
32.71.01.1014	Genteng Village	Kelurahan Genteng	2.11	9,748	4,620	16137
32.71.01.1015	Pakuan Village	Kelurahan Pakuan	1.11	5,429	4,891	16134
32.71.01.1016	Cipaku Village	Kelurahan Cipaku	1.65	14,293	8,662	16133
Totals Rancamaya District			17.04	81,550	4,786	
