= East Bogor =

East Bogor Bogor Timur
- District
- Interactive map of East Bogor
- Country: Indonesia
- Province: West Java
- City: Bogor

Government
  - Head of District (Camat): Feby Darmawan

Area
  - Total: 10.75 km^{2} (4.15 sq mi)

Population (mid 2022 estimate)
  - Total: 108,919
  - Density: 10,066/km^{2} (26,070/sq mi)
- Time zone: UTC+7 (IWST)
- Area code: (+62) 251
- Vehicle registration: F
- Villages: 6
- Website: kecbogortimur.kotabogor.go.id

East Bogor (Indonesian: Bogor Timur, Sundanese: ᮘᮧᮌᮧᮁ ᮝᮦᮒᮔ᮪, romanized: Bogor Wétan) is one of the six administrative districts (kecamatan) in the city of Bogor, West Java Province, Indonesia. The district covers an area of 10.75 km^{2}, and had a population of 95,098 at the 2010 Census and 104,327 at the 2020 Census; the official estimate as at mid 2023 was 108,919. Administratively it is divided into six villages (kelurahan).

== Demography ==
=== Religion ===
Religion Adherents in 2022
Islam	88.69%
Protestantism	5.93%
Catholic	3.99%
Buddhism	1.28%
Hinduism	0.08%
Confucianism	0.03%
Other Religion (Sunda Wiwitan, etc)	0.00%

== Administrative Division ==
=== Urban Villages ===
Kode Wilayah	English name	Indonesian name	Area in km^{2}	Population mid 2022 estimate	Density 2022 (per/Km²)	Post code
32.71.02.1002	Baranangsiang Village	Kelurahan Baranangsiang	2.71	28,440	10,495	16143
32.71.02.1003	Katulampa Village	Kelurahan Katulampa	4.69	32,374	6,903	16144
32.71.02.1005	Sindangrasa Village	Kelurahan Sindangrasa	1.05	16,310	15,533	16145
32.71.02.1004	Sindangsari Village	Kelurahan Sindangsari	1.17	10,772	9,207	16146
32.71.02.1001	Sukasari Village	Kelurahan Sukasari	0.60	13,054	21,757	16142
43.71.02.1006	Tajur Village	Kelurahan Tajur	0.53	7,262	13,758	16141
Totals East Bogor District			10.75	108,212	10,066	
