= Organisation for the Preservation of Birds and their Habitat =

Environmental organization in Indonesia

Burung Indonesia (Indonesian for: BirdLife Indonesia Association), official name: Perhimpunan Pelestarian Burung Liar Indonesia or BirdLife Indonesia Association, is the affiliate of BirdLife International in Indonesia. It was founded on July 15, 2002, with the headquarter in Bogor, Java. In 2014 the organisation had about 80 employees and six field offices. It has a new premises located in Bogor since 15 April 2023, details address is as follow: Komplek Baranangsiang Indah, Jalan Jaltiluhur C8 No. 9B RT.06/RW.04. Katulampa, Bogor Timur Jawa Barat 16144, Indonesia.

== Background ==
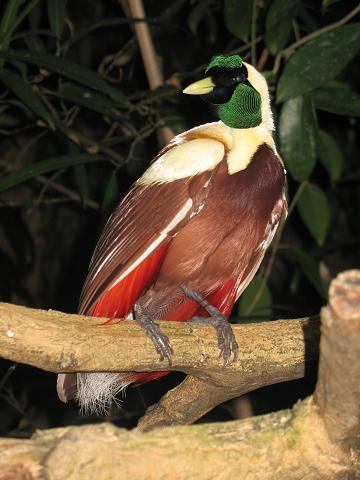
Paradisaea rubra, one of the many indigenous bird species of Indonesia

Indonesia has an enormous biodiversity because the Wallace Line and Lydekker Line splits the archipelago into three biogeographic regions. Because of this, there are both bird species of Asian origin as well as of Australian origin that live here. Nevertheless, many bird species are endemic to Indonesia; about 17% of all the bird species that exist in the world live in this archipelago.

Often, birds like parrots are illegally caught from the wild at a large scale, and sold as pets. Other bird species are captured for consumption. Many people even shoot birds that fly around urban areas, just for fun.

== Main programs ==
Conservation Program. Burung Indonesia works to conserve important species of birds and their habitats through active involvement of local communities, government institutions, the private sector and other stakeholders. To be more focused on the conservation program, the organization chooses priority sites (Important Birds Areas). Each priority site has a group of people concentrating to conserve the site. The organization conducts base line surveys and monitors populations, distribution, habitat and threats for important bird species as a tool to define priorities for action. It also conducts awareness activities for the public on the importance of conserving birds and their habitat, develops multi stakeholders approaches including establishing "Site Support Groups", and provides support to the government for improved planning and management of conservation areas.

Knowledge Center. Burung Indonesias's Knowledge Center collects and analyses information, and facilitates exchange of experience and knowledge within and outside the organization. The objective is to provide data and information that are used to define the direction, priorities and development of Burung Indonesia's conservation work, also develop innovative conservation approaches which have the potential to increase Burung Indonesia's contribution to conservation in Indonesia in the future.

Communication & Business Development. Burung Indonesia works to inform and involve the public through all its activities. The organization created a way for the public to learn about and support the organisation's work through Sahabat Burung Indonesia (SBI, which translates in English as "Friends of the Indonesian Birds"). As the supporters of Burung Indonesia, SBI plays an important role in providing input for the organisation, and SBI individuals help Burung Indonesia to carry out conservation in areas of Indonesia where the organisation does not yet work.

== Activities ==
- Fundraising for protection of birds in the form of gifts and donations
- Other income by means of the sales of T-shirts, mugs, etc.
- Maintaining a knowledge center in which information on birds and their habitat is recorded. On the website of Burung Indonesia, the descriptions of about 100 Indonesian bird species can be found online.
- Education on the rights and value of birds, by means of awareness campaigns.
- Acting against crimes like the large scale capture of birds like cockatoos and lories for sale.
- Preservation of endangered bird species.
- Founding national parks like Aketajawe-Lolobata on the Maluku Islands.
- Cooperation with other organisations for the protection of birds worldwide.

== Sources ==
- Vogels, Tijdschrift over vogels en natuurbescherming, Winter 05/2006, pp. 12–17, magazine of the society for the protection of birds in the Netherlands (in Dutch)
- Website of Birdlife International
