= Tauge goreng =

Indonesian traditional dish

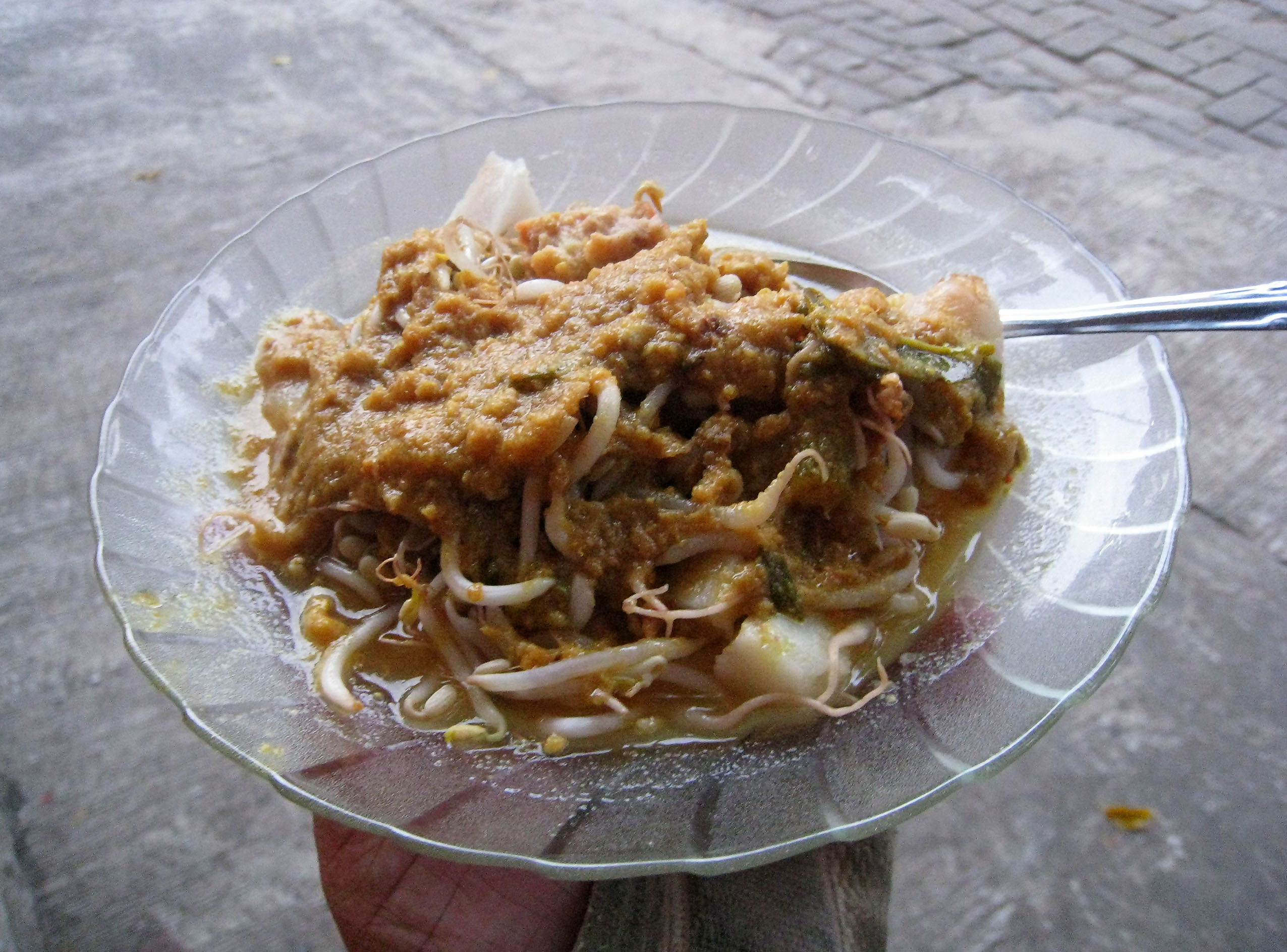
- Street-side tauge goreng
- Alternative names: Taoge goreng, toge goreng
- Course: Main or snack
- Place of origin: Indonesia
- Region or state: Jakarta and Bogor, West Java
- Serving temperature: Hot
- Main ingredients: Tauge (bean sprouts) stir-fried with addition of slices of ketupat rice cake, tofu, and noodles, in oncom-based sauce.

Tauge goreng (Indonesian for "fried bean sprouts") is an Indonesian savoury vegetarian dish made of stir-fried tauge (bean sprouts) with slices of tofu, ketupat or lontong rice cake and yellow noodles, served in a spicy oncom-based sauce. Tauge goreng is a specialty of Jakarta and Bogor city, West Java, Indonesia. It is usually sold as street food using pikulan (carrying pole) or gerobak (cart) by street vendors. It is a popular street food in Indonesia, especially in Jakarta, and Greater Jakarta areas, including Bogor, Depok, Tangerang and Bekasi.

== Ingredients ==
Tauge goreng is a vegetarian dish, the main ingredient of which is the tauge or mung bean sprouts. Usually the bean sprouts are cooked in front of the customer using a small and simple stove. The bean sprouts are not stir fried in cooking oil, but blanched in small amounts of boiling water instead. Then slices of tofu, yellow noodles, and slices of ketupat or lontong rice cake are added, stir fried, mixed and heated together, after which a savoury and spicy oncom-based sauce is poured upon the cooked ingredients. This oncom-based sauce is made by stir-frying ground oncom in small amounts of vegetable oil with spices, including ground galangal, salam leaf (Indonesian bayleaf), slices of tomato, scallion, garlic chives, tauco (fermented soybean paste), kecap manis (sweet soy sauce), key lime juice, and salt.

Oncom consists of bright orange-colored fermented crushed beans similar to tempeh, but made from different fungi. It is an especially popular ingredient in Sundanese cuisine. The oncom-based sauce is also used in the Bogor version of laksa, giving it a quite similar taste, the oncom-based sauce giving an earthy nutty flavour to the dish.

== Variants ==
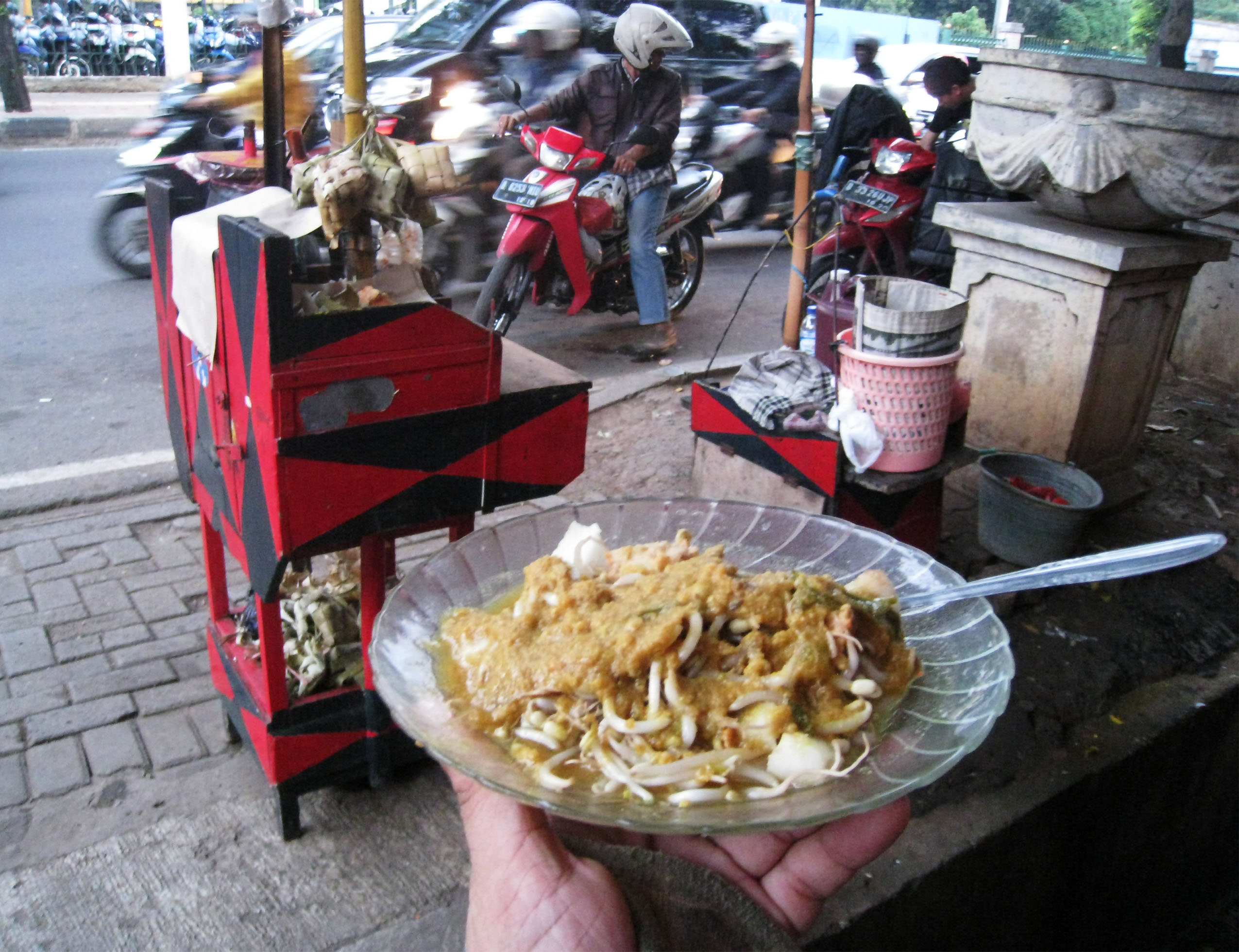
Street food tauge goreng vendor cart in Jakarta

The most popular tauge goreng in Indonesia is the West Javan version, which uses oncom based sauce as mentioned above. However, there are numbers of stir fried beansprouts variants exist in the archipelago.

In Malaysia, there is a similar-named dish called taugeh goreng. However, this Malaysian version is a lot simpler, which only consists of beansprouts stir fried with chopped shallot, garlic and chili in soy sauce. This dish is a simple home cooking, and not sold as a street food in the country.

In Indonesia, this kind of simpler fried beansprout (without lontong rice cake, noodle, oncom and tauco sauce) is usually mixed with diced tofu instead, and it is called gehu, which is abbreviation of taoge and tahu or tumis tahu taoge. It is also a popular simple home cooking, and not a street food.

Another variant of stir fried beansprouts uses ikan asin (salted fish) or teri Medan (Medan's anchovy) to add savoury and salty flavour.

== See also ==
- Laksa
- Ketoprak
- Gado-gado
