= Buitenzorg Residency =

Dutch East Indies administrative division in Java

The Assistant Resident's house in Buitenzorg, 1880s

Buitenzorg Residency (Dutch: Residentie Buitenzorg) was an administrative division (Residency) of the Dutch East Indies located in western Java which existed from 1817 to 1867 and from 1925 to 1942. Its seat was at Buitenzorg (today Bogor, Indonesia) which was also the seat of the colonial government of the Indies after 1905.

== History ==
=== Prehistory ===
The region of the future Buitenzorg Residency was a part of the Sunda Kingdom from the fifth century onwards, with its capital at Pakuan Pajajaran (located roughly around present-day Bogor). As the Banten Sultanate grew in influence, the Sunda Kingdom gradually lost territory to it, until 1579 when its capital was sacked by Banten and the kingdom ceased to exist; the city itself became depopulated as well.

In 1745 the area of the future city of Buitenzorg was gifted to Governor General Gustaaf Willem van Imhoff, who gave it its name and established it as the site of the Governor General's residence for the following two centuries. The Napoleonic governor of the Indies Herman Willem Daendels divided Java into prefectures during his brief rule, and created one at Buitenzorg which was south of the Batavia prefecture, bordered on the western side by Banten and to the south by Preanger.

=== First Buitenzorg Residency (1817–1867) ===
After the departure of the British from Java, the Dutch reorganized the island into a new set of subdivisions called Residencies. The Buitenzorg Residency was created with the same borders as the Prefecture created by Daendels. The first Resident in 1817–8 was F. E. Hardy.

The second Resident, who took office in 1818, was Carel Sirardus Willem van Hogendorp, future Governor-General of the Dutch East Indies. The third was Johan Gerard van Angelbeek, who held the post from 1823 to 1826. After that the status of Buitenzorg was downgraded from a full residency to an independent Assistant Residency, until 1867 when it was abolished and incorporated into an enlarged Batavia Residency.

=== Second Buitenzorg Residency (1925–1942) ===
A new Buitenzorg Residency was created in 1925 as a result of the administrative restructuring which created a number of new Residencies in Java. Roughly one quarter of the Batavia Residency was separated into a new Buitenzorg Residency with essential the same borders as the one created in 1817, with Hendrik Kool as Resident. The next resident was Frederik Willem Slangen, who held the office from June 1927 to October 1929. After that, the Resident was Leendert Gerardus Cornelis Adrianus van der Hoek who held the office until October 1931. It was used as a unit of measure in the 1930 Dutch East Indies census; the Residency was estimated to have a population of 1,121,615, of which around 90 per cent were Native Indonesians, 5 per cent Chinese Indonesians, and the rest Europeans and others.

The borders established in 1925 were changed again in 1931, with many of the new Residencies being abolished; Buitenzorg was expanded to absorb the former West-Priangan Residency, more than doubling its size, and with Pieter Marinus Letterie as the new Resident. In November 1933 Alexander Hendrik de Jong became the new Resident. Finally, in March 1937 Cornelis van Rossen became the final Resident, holding office until the Japanese invasion in 1942. The larger Buitenzorg Residency borders remained in place for the final years of Dutch rule in Java; its borders were retained during the Japanese occupation of the Dutch East Indies but it was renamed to the Indonesian name Bogor; in the early years of Indonesian independence it briefly existed as well, but it was eventually abolished and its territory incorporated into the new West Java province.

== Resident ==
The following is a list of residents who have ruled Buitenzorg.

| Resident of Buitenzorg | Start | Finished |
|---|---|---|
| François Emanuel Hardy | 1817 | 1818 |
| Carel Sirardus Willem van Hogendorp | 1818 | 1823 |
| Johan Gerard van Angelbeek | 1823 | 1826 |
1826-1836 as resident assistant
| Johannes van den Bosch | 1836 | 1838 |
1838-1925 as assistant resident under Batavia Residen (now Jakarta)
| Hendrik Kool | 1 September 1925 | 9 June 1927 |
| Frederik Willem Slangen | 9 June 1927 | 4 October 1929 |
| Leendert Gerardus Cornelis Adrianus van der Hoek | 4 October 1929 | 15 October 1931 |
| Pieter Marinus Letterie | 15 October 1931 | 7 November 1933 |
| Alexander Hendrik de Jong | 7 November 1933 | 24 March 1937 |
| Cornelis van Rossen | 24 March 1937 | just before the Japanese Occupation |
| Kozo Sonoyama | 25 August 1942 | |

== See also ==
- Administrative divisions of the Dutch East Indies
