= List of districts of West Java =

The province of the West Java in Indonesia is divided into regencies and cities, which in turn are divided administratively into districts, known as kecamatan.

The districts of West Java with the regency it falls into are as follows:

- Agrabinta, Cianjur
- Andir, Bandung
- Anjatan, Indramayu
- Antapani, Bandung
- Arahan, Indramayu
- Arcamanik, Bandung
- Argapura, Majalengka
- Arjasari, Bandung
- Arjawinangun, Cirebon
- Astanaanyar, Bandung
- Astanajapura, Cirebon
- Babakan Madang, Bogor
- Babakan, Cirebon
- Babakancikao, Purwakarta
- Babakanciparay, Bandung
- Babelan, Bekasi
- Baleendah, Bandung
- Balongan, Indramayu
- Balubur Limbangan, Garut
- Bandung Kidul, Bandung
- Bandung Kulon, Bandung
- Bandung Wetan, Bandung
- Bangodua, Indramayu
- Banjar, Banjar
- Banjaran, Bandung
- Banjaran, Majalengka
- Banjarsari, Ciamis
- Banjarwangi, Garut
- Bantar Gebang, Bekasi
- Bantargadung, Sukabumi
- Bantarkalong, Tasikmalaya
- Bantarujeg, Majalengka
- Banyuresmi, Garut
- Banyusari, Karawang
- Baros, Sukabumi
- Batujajar, Bandung Barat
- Batujaya, Karawang
- Batununggal, Bandung
- Bayongbong, Garut
- Beber, Cirebon
- Beji, Depok
- Bekasi Barat, Bekasi
- Bekasi Selatan, Bekasi
- Bekasi Timur, Bekasi
- Bekasi Utara, Bekasi
- Binong, Subang
- Blanakan, Subang
- Bogor Barat, Bogor
- Bogor Selatan, Bogor
- Bogor Tengah, Bogor
- Bogor Timur, Bogor
- Bogor Utara, Bogor
- Bojong Asih, Tasikmalaya
- Bojong Genteng, Sukabumi
- Bojong, Purwakarta
- Bojonggambir, Tasikmalaya
- Bojonggede, Bogor
- Bojongloa Kaler, Bandung
- Bojongloa Kidul, Bandung
- Bojongmangu, Bekasi
- Bojongpicung, Cianjur
- Bojongsoang, Bandung
- Bongas, Indramayu
- Buahdua, Sumedang
- Bungbulang, Garut
- Bungursari, Purwakarta
- Cabangbungin, Bekasi
- Campaka Mulya, Cianjur
- Campaka, Cianjur
- Campaka, Purwakarta
- Cangkuang, Bandung
- Cantigi, Indramayu
- Caringin, Bogor
- Caringin, Garut
- Caringin, Sukabumi
- Cariu, Bogor
- Ciamis, Ciamis
- Ciampea, Bogor
- Ciampel, Karawang
- Cianjur, Cianjur
- Ciasem, Subang
- Ciawi, Bogor
- Ciawi, Tasikmalaya
- Ciawigebang, Kuningan
- Cibadak, Sukabumi
- Cibalong, Garut
- Cibalong, Tasikmalaya
- Cibarusah, Bekasi
- Cibatu, Garut
- Cibatu, Purwakarta
- Cibeber, Cianjur
- Cibeunying Kaler, Bandung
- Cibeunying Kidul, Bandung
- Cibeureum, Kuningan
- Cibeureum, Sukabumi
- Cibeureum, Tasikmalaya
- Cibingbin, Kuningan
- Cibinong, Bogor
- Cibinong, Cianjur
- Cibiru, Bandung
- Cibitung, Bekasi
- Cibitung, Sukabumi
- Cibiuk, Garut
- Cibogo, Subang
- Cibuaya, Karawang
- Cibugel, Sumedang
- Cibungbulang, Bogor
- Cicalengka, Bandung
- Cicantayan, Sukabumi
- Cicendo, Bandung
- Cicurug, Sukabumi
- Cidadap, Bandung
- Cidadap, Sukabumi
- Cidahu, Kuningan
- Cidahu, Sukabumi
- Cidaun, Cianjur
- Cidolog, Ciamis
- Cidolog, Sukabumi
- Ciemas, Sukabumi
- Cigalontang, Tasikmalaya
- Cigandamekar, Kuningan
- Cigasong, Majalengka
- Cigedug, Garut
- Cigombong, Bogor
- Cigudeg, Bogor
- Cigugur, Ciamis
- Cigugur, Kuningan
- Cihampelas, Bandung Barat
- Cihaurbeuti, Ciamis
- Cihideung, Tasikmalaya
- Cihurip, Garut
- Cijambe, Subang
- Cijati, Cianjur
- Cijeruk, Bogor
- Cijeungjing, Ciamis
- Cijulang, Ciamis
- Cikadu, Cianjur
- Cikajang, Garut
- Cikakak, Sukabumi
- Cikalong Wetan, Bandung Barat
- Cikalong, Tasikmalaya
- Cikalongkulon, Cianjur
- Cikampek, Karawang
- Cikancung, Bandung
- Cikarang Barat, Bekasi
- Cikarang Pusat, Bekasi
- Cikarang Selatan, Bekasi
- Cikarang Timur, Bekasi
- Cikarang Utara, Bekasi
- Cikatomas, Tasikmalaya
- Cikaum, Subang
- Cikedung, Indramayu
- Cikelet, Garut
- Cikembar, Sukabumi
- Cikidang, Sukabumi
- Cikijing, Majalengka
- Cikole, Sukabumi
- Cikoneng, Ciamis
- Cilaku, Cianjur
- Cilamaya Kulon, Karawang
- Cilamaya Wetan, Karawang
- Cilawu, Garut
- Cilebak, Kuningan
- Cilebar, Karawang
- Ciledug, Cirebon
- Cilengkrang, Bandung
- Cileungsi, Bogor
- Cileunyi, Bandung
- Cililin, Bandung Barat
- Cilimus, Kuningan
- Cimahi Selatan, Cimahi
- Cimahi Tengah, Cimahi
- Cimahi Utara, Cimahi
- Cimahi, Kuningan
- Cimalaka, Sumedang
- Cimanggis, Depok
- Cimanggu, Sumedang
- Cimaragas, Ciamis
- Cimaung, Bandung
- Cimenyan, Bandung
- Cimerak, Ciamis
- Cineam, Tasikmalaya
- Cingambul, Majalengka
- Ciniru, Kuningan
- Ciomas, Bogor
- Cipaku, Ciamis
- Cipanas, Cianjur
- Ciparay, Bandung
- Cipatat, Bandung Barat
- Cipatujah, Tasikmalaya
- Cipedes, Tasikmalaya
- Cipeundeuy, Bandung Barat
- Cipeundeuy, Subang
- Cipicung, Kuningan
- Cipongkor, Bandung Barat
- Cipunagara, Subang
- Ciracap, Sukabumi
- Ciranjang, Cianjur
- Cirebon Selatan, Cirebon
- Cirebon Utara, Cirebon
- Cireunghas, Sukabumi
- Cisaat, Sukabumi
- Cisaga, Ciamis
- Cisalak, Subang
- Cisarua, Bandung Barat
- Cisarua, Bogor
- Cisarua, Sumedang
- Cisayong, Tasikmalaya
- Ciseeng, Bogor
- Cisewu, Garut
- Cisitu, Sumedang
- Cisolok, Sukabumi
- Cisompet, Garut
- Cisurupan, Garut
- Citamiang, Sukabumi
- Citeureup, Bogor
- Ciwaringin, Cirebon
- Ciwaru, Kuningan
- Ciwidey, Bandung
- Coblong, Bandung
- Compreng, Subang
- Conggeang, Sumedang
- Cugenang, Cianjur
- Culamega, Tasikmalaya
- Curugkembar, Sukabumi
- Darangdan, Purwakarta
- Darma, Kuningan
- Darmaraja, Sumedang
- Dawuan, Majalengka
- Dawuan, Subang Regency
- Dayeuhkolot, Bandung
- Depok, Cirebon
- Dramaga, Bogor
- Dukupuntang, Cirebon
- Gabuswetan, Indramayu
- Ganeas, Sumedang
- Gantar, Indramayu
- Garawangi, Kuningan
- Garut Kota, Garut
- Gebang, Cirebon
- Gegerbitung, Sukabumi
- Gegesik, Cirebon
- Gekbrong, Cianjur
- Gempol, Cirebon
- Gunung Guruh, Sukabumi
- Gunung Putri, Bogor
- Gunungsindur, Bogor
- Gununghalu, Bandung Barat
- Gunungpuyuh, Sukabumi
- Gunungtanjung, Tasikmalaya
- Hantara, Kuningan
- Harjamukti, Cirebon
- Haurgeulis, Indramayu
- Haurwangi, Cianjur
- Ibun, Bandung
- Indihiang, Tasikmalaya
- Indramayu, Indramayu
- Jalaksana, Kuningan
- Jalan Cagak, Subang
- Jamanis, Tasikmalaya
- Jampang Kulon, Sukabumi
- Jampang Tengah, Sukabumi
- Japara, Kuningan
- Jasinga, Bogor
- Jati Asih, Bekasi
- Jatisampurna, Bekasi
- Jatibarang, Indramayu
- Jatigede, Sumedang
- Jatiluhur, Purwakarta
- Jatinagara, Ciamis
- Jatinangor, Sumedang
- Jatinunggal, Sumedang
- Jatisari, Karawang
- Jatitujuh, Majalengka
- Jatiwangi, Majalengka
- Jatiwaras, Tasikmalaya
- Jayakerta, Karawang
- Juntinyuat, Indramayu
- Kabandungan, Sukabumi
- Kadipaten, Majalengka
- Kadipaten, Tasikmalaya
- Kadudampit, Sukabumi
- Kadugede, Kuningan
- Kadungora, Garut
- Kadupandak, Cianjur
- Kalapa Nunggal, Sukabumi
- Kalibunder, Sukabumi
- Kalijati, Subang
- Kalimanggis, Kuningan
- Kalipucang, Ciamis
- Kaliwedi, Cirebon
- Kandanghaur, Indramayu
- Kapetakan, Cirebon
- Karang Jaya, Tasikmalaya
- Karangampel, Indramayu
- Karangbahagia, Bekasi
- Karangkancana, Kuningan
- Karangnunggal, Tasikmalaya
- Karangpawitan, Garut
- Karangsembung, Cirebon
- Karangtengah, Cianjur
- Karangtengah, Garut
- Karangwareng, Cirebon
- Karawang Barat, Karawang
- Karawang Timur, Karawang
- Karawang, Karawang
- Katapang, Bandung
- Kawali, Ciamis
- Kawalu, Tasikmalaya
- Kebonpedes, Sukabumi
- Kedawung, Cirebon
- Kedokan Bunder, Indramayu
- Kedungwaringin, Bekasi
- Kejaksan, Cirebon
- Kemang, Bogor
- Kersamanah, Garut
- Kertajati, Majalengka
- Kertasari, Bandung
- Kertasemaya, Indramayu
- Kesambi, Cirebon
- Kiaracondong, Bandung
- Kiarapedes, Purwakarta
- Klangenan, Cirebon
- Klapanunggal, Bogor
- Klari, Karawang
- Kotabaru, Karawang
- Kramatmulya, Kuningan
- Krangkeng, Indramayu
- Kroya, Indramayu
- Kuningan, Kuningan
- Kutawaluya, Karawang
- Kutawaringin, Bandung
- Lakbok, Ciamis
- Langensari, Banjar
- Langkaplancar, Ciamis
- Lebakwangi, Kuningan
- Legon Kulon, Subang
- Lelea, Indramayu
- Leles, Cianjur
- Leles, Garut
- Lemahabang, Cirebon
- Lemahabang, Karawang
- Lemahsugih, Majalengka
- Lemahwungkuk, Cirebon
- Lembang, Bandung Barat
- Lembursitu, Sukabumi
- Lengkong, Bandung
- Lengkong, Sukabumi
- Leuwigoong, Garut
- Leuwiliang, Bogor
- Leuwimunding, Majalengka
- Leuwisadeng, Bogor
- Leuwisari, Tasikmalaya
- Ligung, Majalengka
- Limo, Depok
- Lohbener, Indramayu
- Losarang, Indramayu
- Losari, Cirebon
- Luragung, Kuningan
- Maja, Majalengka
- Majalaya, Bandung
- Majalaya, Karawang
- Majalengka, Majalengka
- Malangbong, Garut
- Maleber, Kuningan
- Mande, Cianjur
- Mandirancan, Kuningan
- Mangkubumi, Tasikmalaya
- Mangunreja, Tasikmalaya
- Maniis, Purwakarta
- Manonjaya, Tasikmalaya
- Margaasih, Bandung
- Margacinta, Bandung
- Margahayu, Bandung
- Medan Satria, Bekasi
- Megamendung, Bogor
- Mekarmukti, Garut
- Muaragembong, Bekasi
- Mundu, Cirebon
- Mustika Jaya, Bekasi
- Nagrak, Sukabumi
- Nagreg, Bandung
- Nanggung, Bogor
- Naringgul, Cianjur
- Ngamprah, Bandung Barat
- Nusaherang, Kuningan
- Nyalindung, Sukabumi
- Pabedilan, Cirebon
- Pabuaran, Cirebon
- Pabuaran, Subang
- Pabuaran, Sukabumi
- Pacet, Bandung
- Pacet, Cianjur
- Padaherang, Ciamis
- Padakembang, Tasikmalaya
- Padalarang, Bandung Barat
- Pagaden, Subang
- Pagelaran, Cianjur
- Pagerageung, Tasikmalaya
- Pakenjeng, Garut
- Pakisjaya, Karawang
- Palasah, Majalengka
- Palimanan, Cirebon
- Pamanukan, Subang
- Pamarican, Ciamis
- Pameungpeuk, Bandung
- Pameungpeuk, Garut
- Pamijahan, Bogor
- Pamulihan, Garut
- Pamulihan, Sumedang
- Panawangan, Ciamis
- Pancalang, Kuningan
- Pancatengah, Tasikmalaya
- Pancoran Mas, Depok
- Pangalengan, Bandung
- Pangandaran, Ciamis
- Pangatikan, Garut
- Pangenan, Cirebon
- Pangkalan, Karawang
- Panguragan, Cirebon
- Panjalu, Ciamis
- Panumbangan, Ciamis
- Panyingkiran, Majalengka
- Parakan Salak, Sukabumi
- Parigi, Ciamis
- Parongpong, Bandung Barat
- Parung Kuda, Sukabumi
- Parungpanjang, Bogor
- Parung, Bogor
- Parungponteng, Tasikmalaya
- Pasaleman, Cirebon
- Pasawahan, Kuningan
- Pasawahan, Purwakarta
- Paseh, Bandung
- Paseh, Sumedang
- Pasirjambu, Bandung
- Pasirkuda, Cianjur
- Pasirwangi, Garut
- Pataruman, Banjar
- Patok Beusi, Subang
- Pebayuran, Bekasi
- Pedes, Karawang
- Pekalipan, Cirebon
- Pelabuhan Ratu, Sukabumi
- Peundeuy, Garut
- Plered, Cirebon
- Plered, Purwakarta
- Plumbon, Cirebon
- Pondok Gede, Bekasi
- Pondok Melati, Bekasi
- Pondoksalam, Purwakarta
- Purabaya, Sukabumi
- Purwadadi, Subang
- Purwaharja, Banjar
- Purwakarta, Purwakarta
- Purwasari, Karawang
- Pusakanagara, Subang
- Puspahiang, Tasikmalaya
- Rajadesa, Ciamis
- Rajagaluh, Majalengka
- Rajapolah, Tasikmalaya
- Rancabungur, Bogor
- Rancabali, Bandung
- Rancaekek, Bandung
- Rancah, Ciamis
- Rancakalong, Sumedang
- Rancasari, Bandung
- Rawalumbu, Bekasi
- Rawamerta, Karawang
- Regol, Bandung
- Rengasdengklok, Karawang
- Rongga, Bandung Barat
- Rumpin, Bogor
- Sadananya, Ciamis
- Sagalaherang, Subang
- Sagaranten, Sukabumi
- Salawu, Tasikmalaya
- Salopa, Tasikmalaya
- Samarang, Garut
- Sariwangi, Tasikmalaya
- Sawangan, Depok
- Sedong, Cirebon
- Selaawi, Garut
- Selajambe, Kuningan
- Serang Baru, Bekasi
- Setu, Bekasi
- Sidamulih, Ciamis
- Simpenan, Sukabumi
- Sindang, Indramayu
- Sindangagung, Kuningan
- Sindangbarang, Cianjur
- Sindangkerta, Bandung Barat
- Sindangwangi, Majalengka
- Singajaya, Garut
- Singaparna, Tasikmalaya
- Situraja, Sumedang
- Sliyeg, Indramayu
- Sodonghilir, Tasikmalaya
- Solokan Jeruk, Bandung
- Soreang, Bandung
- Subang, Kuningan
- Subang, Subang
- Sucinaraja, Garut
- Sukabumi, Sukabumi
- Sukadana, Ciamis
- Sukagumiwang, Indramayu
- Sukahaji, Majalengka
- Sukahening, Tasikmalaya
- Sukajadi, Bandung
- Sukajaya, Bogor
- Sukakarya, Bekasi
- Sukalarang, Sukabumi
- Sukaluyu, Cianjur
- Sukamakmur, Bogor
- Sukanagara, Cianjur
- Sukaraja, Bogor
- Sukaraja, Sukabumi
- Sukaraja, Tasikmalaya
- Sukarame, Tasikmalaya
- Sukaratu, Tasikmalaya
- Sukaresik, Tasikmalaya
- Sukaresmi, Cianjur
- Sukaresmi, Garut
- Sukasari, Bandung
- Sukasari, Purwakarta
- Sukasari, Sumedang
- Sukatani, Bekasi
- Sukatani, Purwakarta
- Sukawangi, Bekasi
- Sukawening, Garut
- Sukmajaya, Depok
- Sukra, Indramayu
- Sumber, Cirebon
- Sumberjaya, Majalengka
- Sumedang Selatan, Sumedang
- Sumedang Utara, Sumedang
- Sumurbandung, Bandung
- Surade, Sukabumi
- Surian, Sumedang
- Susukan, Cirebon
- Susukanlebak, Cirebon
- Tajur Halang, Bogor
- Takokak, Cianjur
- Talaga, Majalengka
- Talagasari, Karawang
- Talegong, Garut
- Tamansari, Bogor
- Tamansari, Tasikmalaya
- Tambaksari, Ciamis
- Tambelang, Bekasi
- Tambun Selatan, Bekasi
- Tambun Utara, Bekasi
- Tanah Sareal, Bogor
- Tanggeung, Cianjur
- Tanjung Siang, Subang
- Tanjungjaya, Tasikmalaya
- Tanjungkerta, Sumedang
- Tanjungmedar, Sumedang
- Tanjungsari, Bogor
- Tanjungsari, Sumedang
- Taraju, Tasikmalaya
- Tarogong Kaler, Garut
- Tarogong Kidul, Garut
- Tarumajaya, Bekasi
- Tawang, Tasikmalaya
- Tegal Buleud, Sukabumi
- Tegalwaru, Karawang
- Tegalwaru, Purwakarta
- Telukjambe Barat, Karawang
- Telukjambe Timur, Karawang
- Telukjambe, Karawang
- Tempuran, Karawang
- Tengah Tani, Cirebon
- Tenjo, Bogor
- Tenjolaya, Bogor
- Tirtajaya, Karawang
- Tirtamulya, Karawang
- Tomo, Sumedang
- Trisi, Indramayu
- Tukdana, Indramayu
- Ujung Jaya, Sumedang
- Ujungberung, Bandung
- Wado, Sumedang
- Waled, Cirebon
- Waluran, Sukabumi
- Wanaraja, Garut
- Wanayasa, Purwakarta
- Warudoyong, Sukabumi
- Warung Kiara, Sukabumi
- Warungkondang, Cianjur
- Weru, Cirebon
- Widasari, Indramayu
