= Rumpin =

Rumpin ᮛᮥᮙ᮪ᮕᮤᮔ᮪
- District
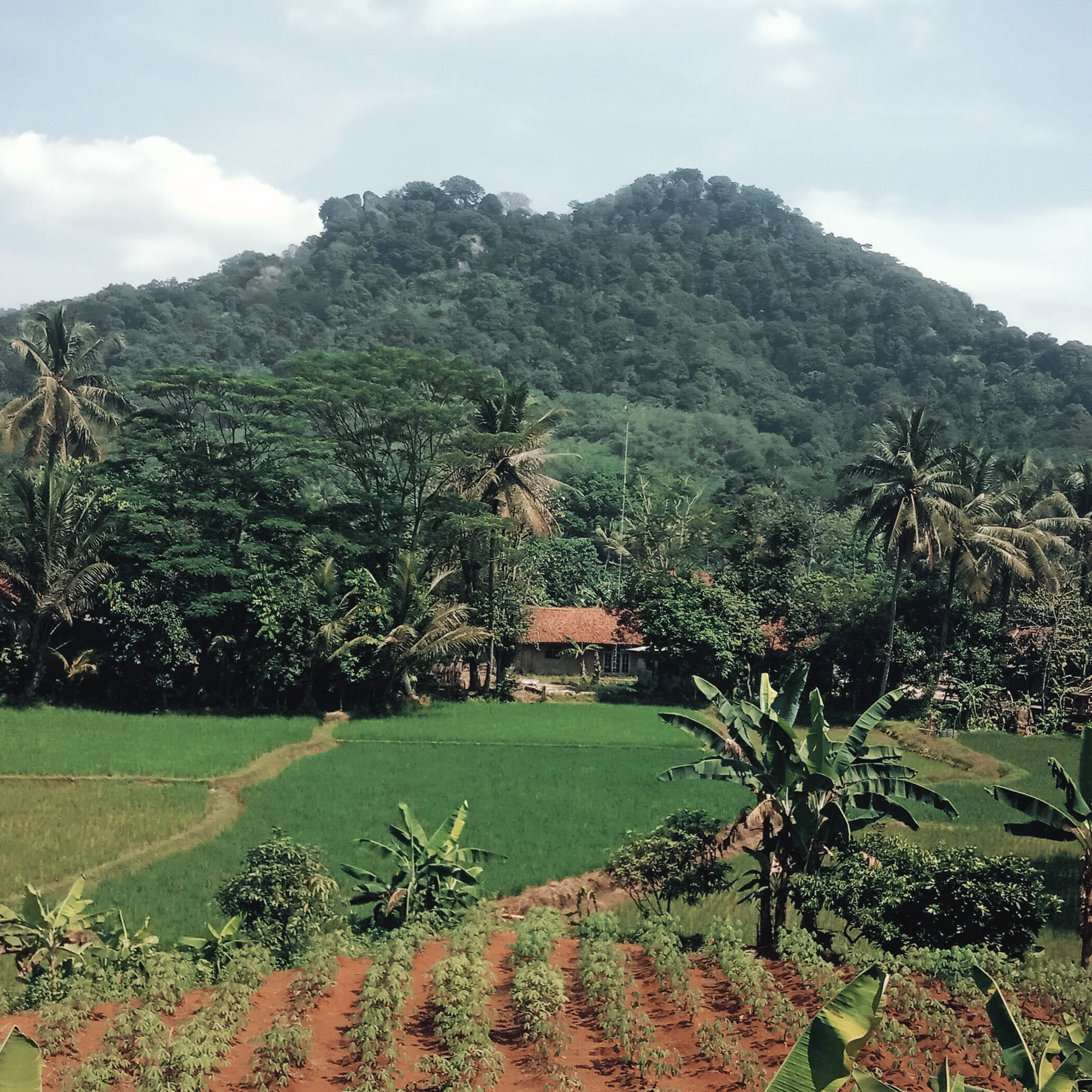
- Mount Munara in Kampung Sawah, Rumpin.
- Motto: Prayoga Tohaga Sayaga (Sundanese) ("Utama, Kokoh dan Kuat, Sedia")
- Rumpin location in Bogor Regency
- Coordinates: 6°26′32″S 106°38′26″E
- Country: Indonesia
- Province: West Java
- Regency: Bogor Regency

Government
  - Camat: Rusliandy

Area
  - Land: 117.55 km^{2} (45.39 sq mi)
- Elevation: 94 m (308 ft)

Population (mid 2024 estimate)
  - Total: 164,262
  - Density: 1,397.4/km^{2} (3,619.2/sq mi)
- Time zone: UTC+7 (WIB)
- Postal code: 16350
- Area codes: 0251
- Vehicle registration: F
- Villages: 14
- Website: kecamatanrumpin.bogorkab.go.id

Rumpin (Sundanese: ᮛᮥᮙ᮪ᮕᮤᮔ᮪) is a town and an administrative district (kecamatan) in Bogor Regency, in the Province of West Java, Indonesia, and thus part of Jakarta's metropolitan area. This district has a postal code of 16350.

Rumpin District covers an area of 117.55 km^{2}, and had a population of 129,150 at the 2010 Census and 146,007 at the 2020 Census; the official estimate as at mid 2024 was 164,262 (comprising 85,643 males and 78,619 females). The administrative centre is at the town of Rumpin, and the district is sub-divided into fourteen villages (desa), all sharing the postcode of 16350, as listed below with their areas and populations as at mid 2024.

== Administrative division ==
Rumpin District consists of 14 villages (desa). Its administrative center is located in Rumpin village. Leuwibatu, Gobang, and Cidokom are in the far south, while Mekarsari and Sukamulya are in the far north, all of which are the same distance from the center of the Rumpin government.

Kode Wilayah	Name of desa	Area in km^{2}	Population mid 2023 estimate
32.01.18.2002	Leuwibatu	14.20	11,869
32.01.18.2003	Cidokom	5.54	9,509
32.01.18.2004	Gobang	6.38	9,539
32.01.18.2006	Rabak	15.56	15,724
32.01.18.2005	Cibodas	9.14	11,554
32.01.18.2007	Kampung Sawah	6.50	13,189
32.01.18.2001	Rumpin (town)	4.78	7,597
32.01.18.2008	Cipinang	9.96	17,314
32.01.18.2009	Sukasari	8.55	14,550
32.01.18.2011	Kertajaya	6.67	8,626
32.01.18.2010	Tamansari	9.77	15,154
32.01.18.2012	Sukamulya	10.70	15,656
32.01.18.2013	Mekarsari	5.80	8,552
32.01.18.2014	Mekarjaya	4.00	5,429
32.01.18	Totals	117.55	164,262

== Demographics ==
=== Ethnic groups ===
Rumpin is home to the Sundanese people, who are the original inhabitants of West Java. There is no official data on the number of ethnic groups in Rumpin, but as a whole it is dominated by Sundanese. In addition, there are a small number of people who are Betawi immigrants, also Javanese and Chinese (Benteng) immigrants, which is quite common found in Rumpin.

=== Religion ===
Religion in Rumpin (2010)
Religion	Percent
Islam	98%
Christianity	1%
Other religions	1%

The majority of the population of Rumpin district embraces the religion of Islam, but a small portion follow Christianity and Buddhism, the latter adhered to by the minority Chinese. The original inhabitants in West Java (namely the Sundanese people) generally embrace Islam, although some embrace the original beliefs of the Sundanese people, namely Sunda Wiwitan.

=== Language ===
Sundanese which is the original and dominant language in West Java, affects the language of communication used in social life. Sundanese is the main language used by the people of Rumpin and West Java in general, apart from Indonesian which is the official language of Indonesia.

== Borders ==
Rumpin district is directly adjacent to Cisauk district of Tangerang Regency (in Banten Province) to the north, to Rancabungur, Ciseeng (to which it is connected by the Gerendong Bridge), and Gunungsindur districts to the east, Cigudeg and Parung Panjang districts to the west, and Leuwisadeng, Leuwiliang, and Cibungbulang districts to the south.

Direction	Adjoining Area
North	Cisauk district (of Tangerang Regency within Banten Province)
South	Leuwisadeng, Leuwiliang, and Cibungbulang districts
East	Rancabungur, Ciseeng, and Gunungsindur districts
West	Cigudeg and Parung Panjang districts
