= Bantargebang =

Coordinates: 6°15′20″S 106°58′07″E

- District
- Location in Bekasi, Java and Indonesia Bantargebang (Java) Bantargebang (Indonesia)
- Country: Indonesia
- Province: West Java
- City: Bekasi
- Established: 24 December 1981

Area
  - Total: 19.24 km^{2} (7.43 sq mi)

Population (mid 2023 estimate)
  - Total: 113,988
  - Density: 5,925/km^{2} (15,340/sq mi)
- Time zone: UTC+7 (IWST)
- Area code: (+62) 21
- Vehicle registration: B
- Villages: 6
- Website: kec-bantargebang.bekasikota.go.id

Bantargebang is one of the twelve administrative districts (kecamatan) within the city of Bekasi, in Jabodetabek (Jakarta's metropolitan area) on the island of Java, Indonesia. The district covers an area of 1,924 hectares (4,754 acres), and had a population of 95,845 at the 2010 Census and 107,216 at the 2020 Census; the official estimate as at mid 2023 was 113,988 - comprising 58,047 males and 55,941 females.

== History ==
Bantargebang was officially established on 24 December 1981, after being split off from the western part of Setu district, which at the time was still part of Bekasi Regency. Following the establishment of Bekasi City in 1996, the district officially became part of the newly-established city.

== Communities ==
The administrative centre is located in Bantargebang kelurahan, and the district is sub-divided into four urban "villages" or communities (kelurahan), as listed below with their areas and their populations as at mid 2023, together with their postcodes.

Kode Wilayah	Name of kelurahan	Area in km^{2}	Population mid 2023 estimate	Post code
32.75.07.1003	Bantargebang	4.39	34,205	17151
32.75.07.1004	Cikiwul	5.46	28,538	17152
32.75.07.1007	Ciketing Udik	4.36	25,393	17153
32.75.07.1008	Sumur Batu	5.03	25,852	17154
32.75.07	Totals	19.24	113,988	
