= Kota Harapan Indah =

Planned township in West Java, Indonesia

Coordinates: 6.182086°S 106.973074°E

Harapan Indah City Kota Harapan Indah
- Planned township
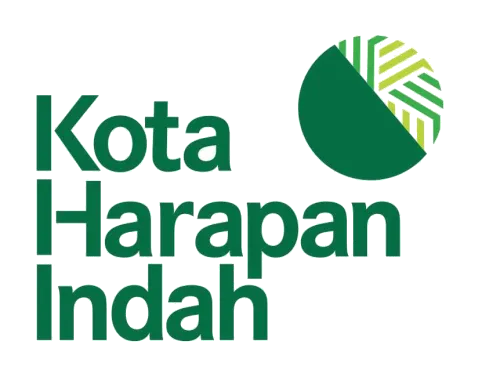
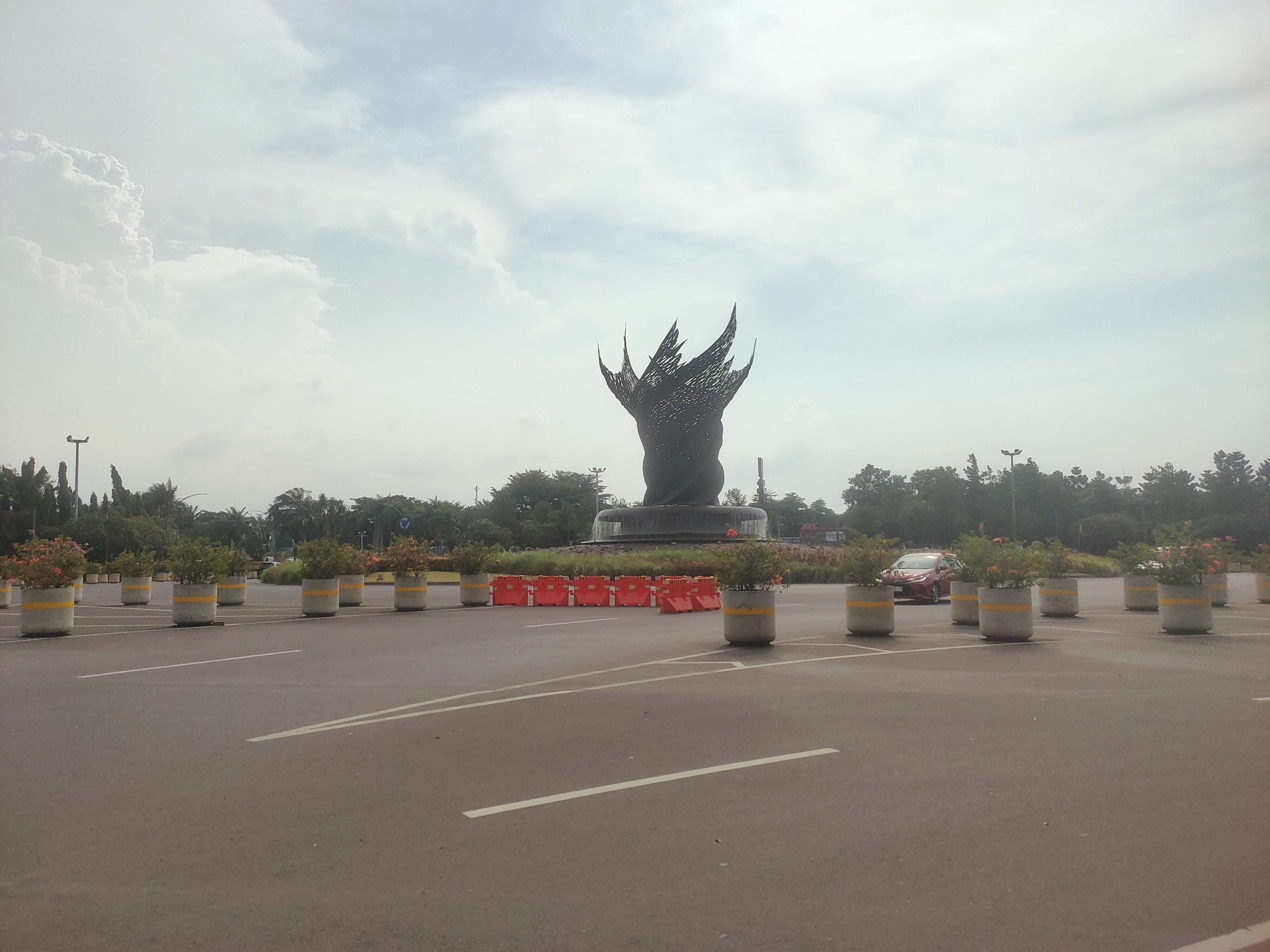
- Official logo of Kota Harapan Indah Tugu Tarian Langit Monument

- Location in Bekasi, Java and Indonesia Harapan Indah City (Java) Harapan Indah City (Indonesia)
- Country: Indonesia
- Province: West Java; Jakarta
- City / Regency: Bekasi City; Bekasi Regency
- Founded: 30 April 1993

Area
  - Total: 22 km^{2} (8.5 sq mi)
- (2,200 hectares)

Population (2024 estimate)
  - Total: 60,000–125,000
- Time zone: UTC+7 (IWST)
- Area code: (+62) 21
- Vehicle registration: B
- Website: kotaharapanindah.id

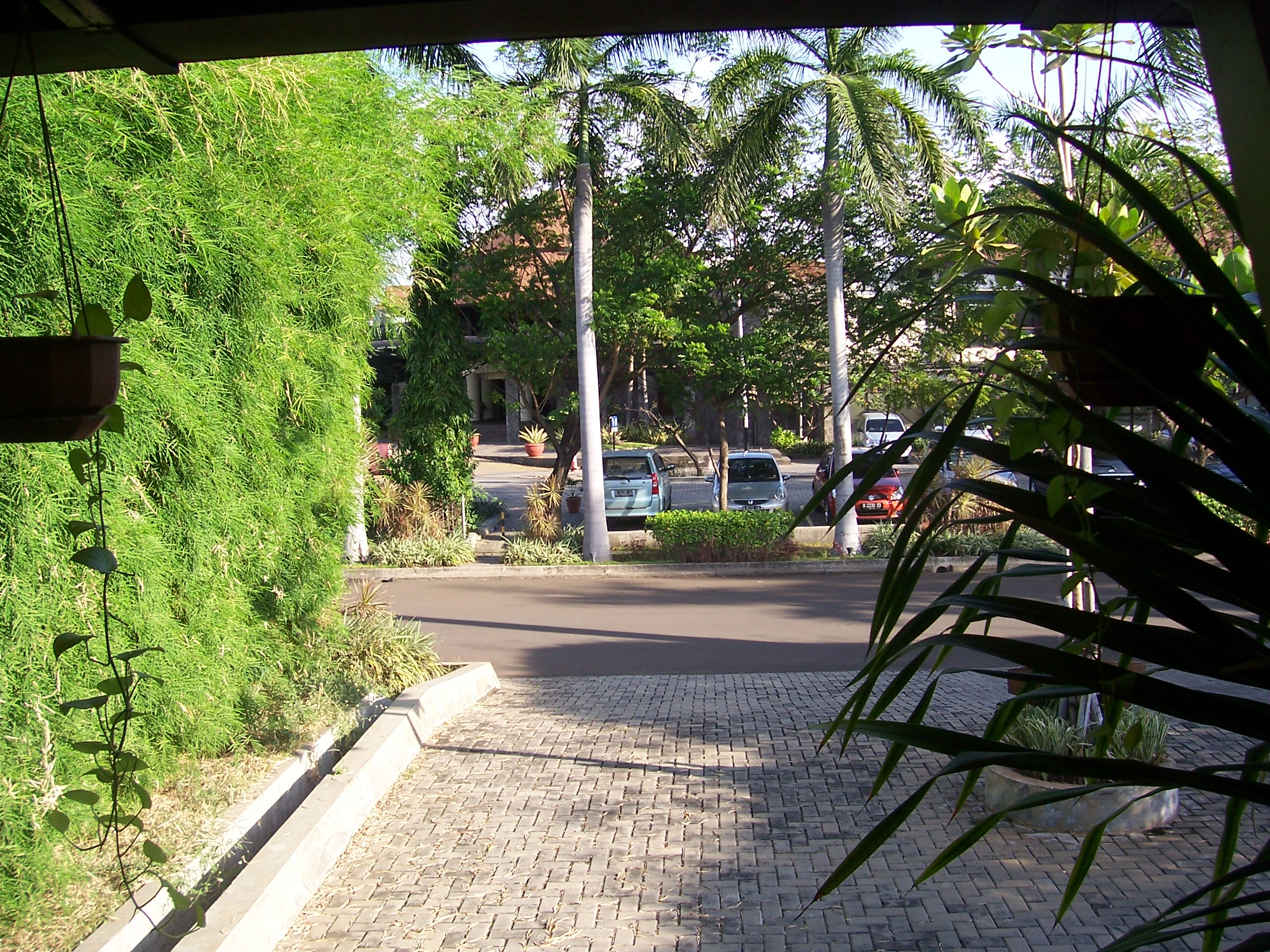
Harapan Indah sports club

Kota Harapan Indah (lit. 'City of Beautiful Hopes'), or Harapan Indah, abbreviated as HI (Indonesian pronunciation: [haʔˈi]), is a planned township located between Medan Satria, Bekasi City, Cakung Timur, and Tarumajaya, Bekasi Regency, West Java, Indonesia.

Covering an area of approximately 2,200 hectares (22 km²), the township was founded on 30 April 1993 by Damai Putra Group and spans the administrative border between Medan Satria in Bekasi City and Tarumajaya in Bekasi Regency. It is equipped with supermarkets, schools, a sports club, hospitals, hotels, and a number of office buildings. The township is one of the largest planned residential areas in the eastern and northern parts of Jakarta, forming a border with the capital and situated within the Greater Jakarta area. The estimated population of the township ranges between 60,000 and 125,000 residents as of 2024.

== Geography ==
Kota Harapan Indah, Bekasi

Kota Harapan Indah straddles the administrative boundary between Bekasi City and Bekasi Regency, bordered to the west by Cakung in East Jakarta. The township lies within the Greater Jakarta metropolitan area, approximately 15 km northeast of central Jakarta.

== Facilities ==
=== Hotels & Recreation ===
- Santika Premier Hotel
- Transera Waterpark
- Harapan Indah Sports Club
- Parkour Park (Taman Parkour)
- XXI (cinema)
- Hive Lifestyle Hub

=== Shopping & Retail ===
- Lotte Mart
- Uniqlo
- Living Plaza Harapan Indah
- Grand Lucky Plaza
- Courts Megastore
- Gramedia
- Azko
- BP-AKR Gas Station
- Harapan Indah Modern Market (Pasar Modern Harapan Indah)
- Family Market Harapan Indah (Pasar Family Harapan Indah)
- Sentral Onderdil Shop Houses (Ruko Sentra Onderdril)
- Niaga Business Center (Kawasan Sentra Niaga)
- Harapan Indah Business Center (Sentra Bisnis Harapan Indah)
- Sayana Apartment

=== Dining & Food ===
- KFC
- A&W
- Starbucks
- Burger King
- Fore Coffee
- Yoi Teppanyaki
- Meli Melo Central Kuliner 1 & 2
- Flyamboyan Indah Food Court (Pujasera)

=== Healthcare ===
- EKA Hospital Harapan Indah
- Citra Harapan Hospital (RS Citra Harapan)
- Altius Hospital
- Bunda Hospital (Rumah Sakit Bunda)
- Jaya Pharmacy Clinic (Klinik Apotek Jaya)

=== Places of Worship ===
==== Mosques ====
- Masjid Raya Kota Harapan Indah (Grand Mosque of Kota Harapan Indah)
- Masjid Asy-Syuhada Harapan Indah

==== Churches ====
- Santo Albertus Catholic Church
- Agape Kingdom Christian Church
- Indonesian Christian Church
- GBI Asia Tropis Church
- Pengabar Injil Christian Church

==== Buddhist Temples ====
- Vihara Buddha Jayanti Kota Harapan Indah
- Vihara Taman Harapan Indah

=== Others ===
- Islamic History Museum (Museum Sejarah Islam)
- Medan Satria Metro Police Station (Polsek Metro Medan Satria)
- Harapan Indah 1 Sub-Sector Police Post
- TransJakarta Bus Stop (Transera – Pulo Gadung)
- Pulo Gebang – Kelapa Gading Toll Road

== Education ==
=== University ===
- Esa Unggul University

=== Senior High School ===
- SMAN 10 Bekasi

=== Junior High School ===
- SMPN 19 Flamboyan

=== Primary School ===
- BPK Penabur School
- Al Azhar School
- Cherry Montessori School
- Lazuardi School
- SDK Penuai
- Cinderamata School
- Al Izzah Islamic Elementary School
- Yaperti School

== Transportation ==
Transjakarta operates a non-BRT feeder route from Harapan Indah to the Pulo Gadung Terminal, labeled as route 2B. The route was previously operated from Harapan Indah to Asmi, and has since been modified to run from Transera Harapan Indah to Pulo Gadung. Bus stops are located at several points within the complex, connected to the Jak Lingko network via route JAK40 serving the Taman Harapan Baru – Pulo Gebang corridor. Route 2B operates both BRT and non-BRT services.

JakLingko operates route 40 (Taman Harapan Baru – Pulo Gebang) within Harapan Indah, with feeder stops located throughout the township extending to Taman Harapan Baru, Kelurahan Pejuang.

City minibuses (Angkutan Kota) serve the area via routes T31 and T30. Route T31 runs from Harapan Indah to Pulo Gadung, while route T30 serves Harapan Indah to Taman Harapan Baru and Kranji railway station.

Trans Bekasi Keren operates a route from Tanah Apit to Bekasi Terminal, providing connections to Kranji Station, Bekasi Station, Bekasi Timur Terminal, and Jati Mulya LRT station.

Perum DAMRI operates intercity and intra-city bus services from Harapan Indah, including a route to Bandung.

JA Connexion operates an airport bus service from Kota Harapan Indah to Soekarno–Hatta International Airport, with its pool located at the KHI Transera bus stop.

The Jakarta MRT East–West Line, with a planned terminus at a future Medan Satria station near Harapan Indah, is currently under feasibility study.

== See also ==
- Greater Jakarta
- DKI Jakarta
- Bekasi
- Bekasi Regency
