= Tambun (disambiguation) =

Tambun is a town in Perak, Malaysia.

Tambun may also refer to:

- Tambun (federal constituency), electoral constituency in Malaysia
- Tambun biscuit, delicacy from Penang, Malaysia
- Tambun rock art, rock painting in Perak, Malaysia
- North Tambun, district in West Java, Indonesia
- South Tambun, district in West Java, Indonesia
  - Tambun railway station, railway station in South Tambun
