= Tambelang =

- District
- Interactive map of Tambelang
- Country: Indonesia
- Province: West Java
- Regency: Bekasi
- Established: 24 December 1981

Area
  - Total: 32.40 km^{2} (12.51 sq mi)

Population (mid 2024 estimate)
  - Total: 45,430
  - Density: 1,402/km^{2} (3,632/sq mi)
- Time zone: UTC+7 (Indonesia Western Time)

Tambelang is an administrative district (kecamatan) of Bekasi Regency, in West Java, Indonesia (not to be confused with the Tembelang Districts in Jombang Regency and Semarang city). The district covers an area of 32.40 km^{2}, and had a population of 35,376 at the 2010 Census and 40,862 at the 2020 Census; the official estimate as at mid 2024 was 45,430 - comprising 22,990 males and 22,440 females.

== History ==
Tambelang District was officially established on 24 December 1981, after being split off from the western part of Sukatani district.

== Geography ==
The administrative centre is located at the town of Sukarapih, and the district is sub-divided into seven villages (desa), all sharing the postcode of 17621, as listed below with their areas and their populations as at mid 2024.

Kode Wilayah	Name of Desa	Area in km^{2}	Population mid 2024 estimate
32.16.16.2001	Sukawijaya	4.50	4,949
32.16.16.2002	Sukamaju	5.30	5,951
32.16.16.2003	Sukaraja	2.20	5,396
32.16.16.2004	Sukarapih	4.20	8,681
32.16.16.2005	Sukarahayu	4.00	7,753
32.16.16.2006	Sukamantri	4.50	6,616
32.16.16.2007	Sukabakti	7.70	6,084
32.16.16	Totals	32.40	45,430
