= Gerendong Bridge =

Bridge in Indonesia

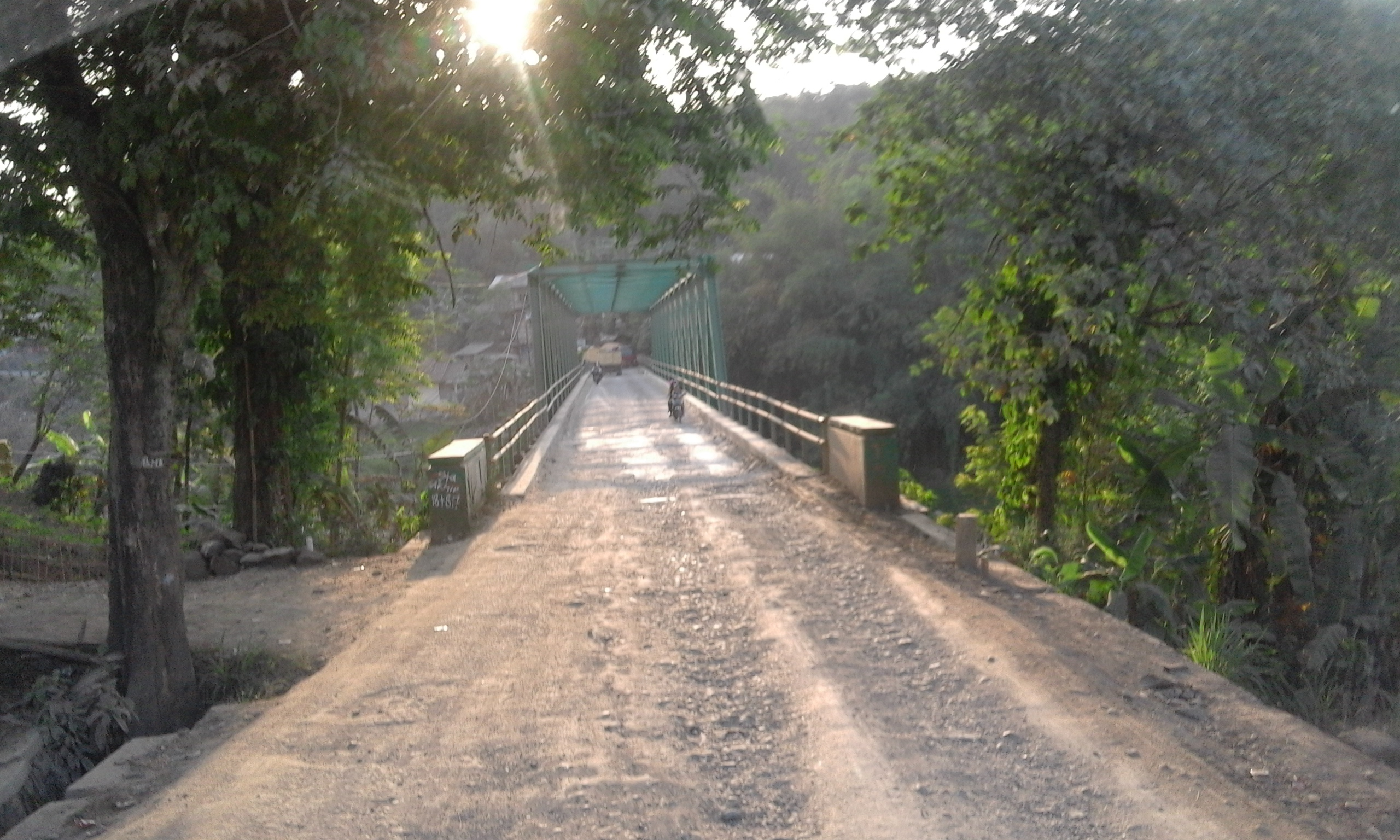
- Gerendong Bridge from the direction of Ciseeng
- Coordinates: 6.4577829°S 106.6544701°E
- Carries: Motor vehicles and pedestrians
- Crosses: Cisadane River
- Locale: Bogor Regency, West Java, Indonesia
- Official name: Jembatan Gerendong

Characteristics
- Total length: 80 metres (262 ft)
- Width: 7 metres (23 ft)
- Longest span: 80 metres (262 ft)
- No. of spans: 1 (main bridge)

History
- Construction cost: IDR 16,5 milliar
- Opened: 13 August 2020

Location
- Interactive map

Gerendong Bridge (Indonesian: Jembatan Gerendong; Sundanese: Sasak Gerendong) is a bridge that connects two areas in Bogor Regency, West Java, Indonesia; namely Rumpin district and Ciseeng district.
