= Muaragembong =

- District
- Location within West Java
- Coordinates: 5°59′S 107°2′E
- Country: Indonesia
- Province: West Java
- Regency: Bekasi
- Established: 24 December 1981

Area
  - Total: 160.54 km^{2} (61.98 sq mi)

Population (mid 2024 estimate)
  - Total: 45,290
  - Density: 282.1/km^{2} (730.7/sq mi)
- Time zone: UTC+7 (Indonesia Western Time)

Muaragembong or Muara Gembong, is the most northerly district (kecamatan) of Bekasi Regency, in West Java, Indonesia. It covers an area of 160.54 km^{2}, and had a population of 35,503 at the 2010 Census and 40,321 at the 2020 Census; the official estimate as at mid 2023 was 45,290, comprising 23,137 males and 22,153 females.

== History ==
Muaragembong was officially established on 24 December 1981, after being split off from the western part of Cabangbungin district.

== Geography ==
The administrative centre is located at Pantaimekar, and the district is sub-divided into 6 villages (desa), all sharing a post-code of 17730, as listed below with their areas and their populations as at mid 2024.

Kode Wilayah	Name of Desa	Area in km^{2}	Population mid 2024 estimate
32.16.17.2004	Pantaiharapanjaya	51.94	8,311
32.16.17.2001	Pantaimekar	14.57	8,478
32.16.17.2005	Pantaisederhana	12.00	4,461
32.16.17.2003	Pantaibakti	34.42	7,868
32.16.17.2002	Pantaibahagia	30.10	8,170
32.16.17.2006	Jayasakti	17.51	8,002
32.16.17	Totals	160.54	45,290

== Demographics ==
As of the 2020 Indonesian census, the district had a population of 40,321, with an average population growth rate of 1.24% annually since 2010. The gender ratio in mid 2024 was 104.44.

== Geography ==
The district includes the delta of the Citarum River, where significant sedimentation still occurs. It is located on the Bay of Jakarta.

Since around 2009, coastal erosion has heavily impacted the low-lying, coastal villages, with several rukun tetangga (neighborhood-level administrative divisions) having been lost to the sea. The local government has been attempting to reduce the impact through the plantation of mangrove trees in vulnerable areas, which are prone to coastal flooding.

== Economy ==
Since at least the 1970s, the coastal communities has been engaging in milkfish and shrimp farming.
