= Cigudeg =

- Town and District
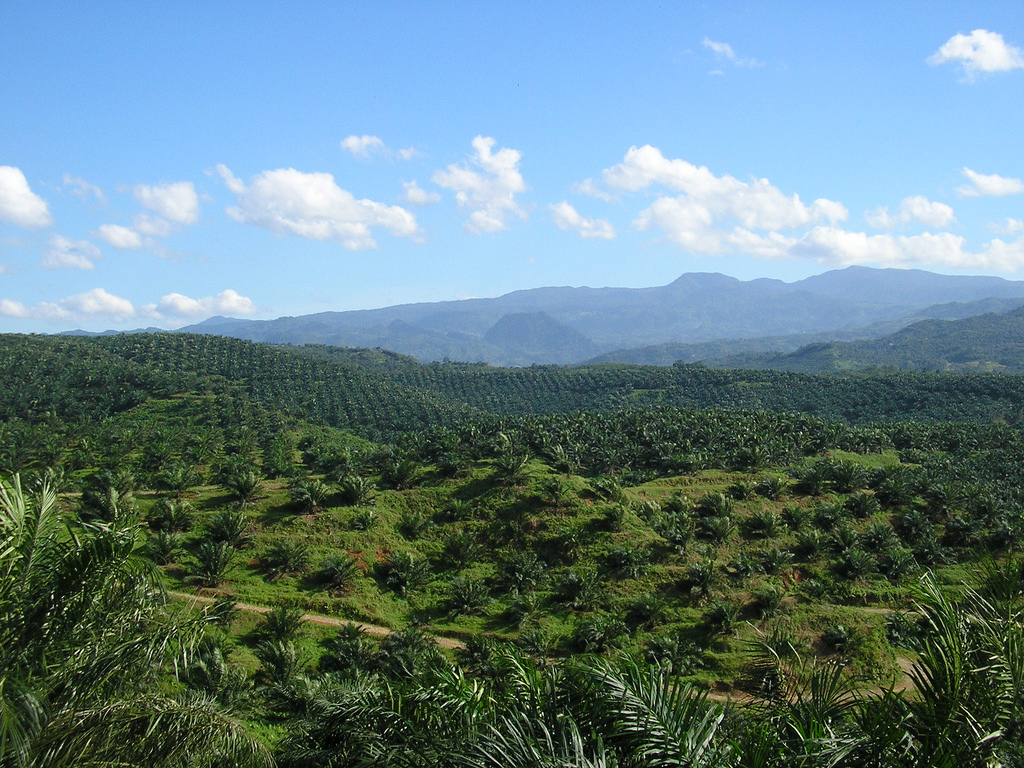
- Oil palm plantation in Cigudeg.

- Location in Bogor Regency, Java and Indonesia Cigudeg (Java) Cigudeg (Indonesia)
- Coordinates: 6°32′58″S 106°32′05″E
- Country: Indonesia
- Province: West Java
- Regency: Bogor Regency

Area
  - Total: 161.18 km^{2} (62.23 sq mi)
- Elevation: 369 m (1,211 ft)

Population (mid 2024 estimate)
  - Total: 148,182
  - Density: 919.36/km^{2} (2,381.1/sq mi)
- Time zone: UTC+7 (IWST)
- Area code: (+62) 251
- Vehicle registration: F
- Villages: 15
- Website: kecamatancigudeg.bogorkab.go.id

Cigudeg is a town and an administrative district (Indonesian: kecamatan) in the Bogor Regency of West Java Province, Indonesia and thus part of Jakarta's metropolitan area.

Cigudeg District covers an area of 161.18 km^{2}, and had a population of 117,278 at the 2010 Census and 133,931 at the 2020 Census; the official estimate as at mid 2024 was 148,182 (comprising 77,818 males and 70,364 females). The administrative centre is at the town of Cigudeg, and the district is sub-divided into fifteen villages (desa), all sharing the postcode of 16660, as listed below with their areas and populations as at mid 2024.

Kode Wilayah	Name of desa	Area in km^{2}	Population mid 2024 estimate
32.01.22.2011	Sukaraksa	5.24	10,411
32.01.22.2001	Sukamaju	6.33	11,125
32.01.22.2002	Cigudeg (town)	11.71	16,669
32.01.22.2004	Banyuresmi	2.31	7,813
32.01.22.2010	Wargajaya	7.72	7,928
32.01.22.2003	Bunar	8.97	10,173
32.01.22.2014	Mekarjaya	7.37	8,427
32.01.22.2005	Cintamanik	23.59	10,704
32.01.22.2012	Banyuwangi	8.22	6,412
32.01.22.2013	Banyuasih	9.26	5,525
32.01.22.2015	Tegallega	9.61	9,387
32.01.22.2009	Batujajar	8.60	7,847
32.01.22.2008	Rengasjajar	1.24	11,785
32.01.22.2007	Bangunjaya	14.20	10,995
32.01.22.2006	Argapura	36.81	12,981
32.01.22	Totals	161.18	148,182
