= Babelan =

- Town and District
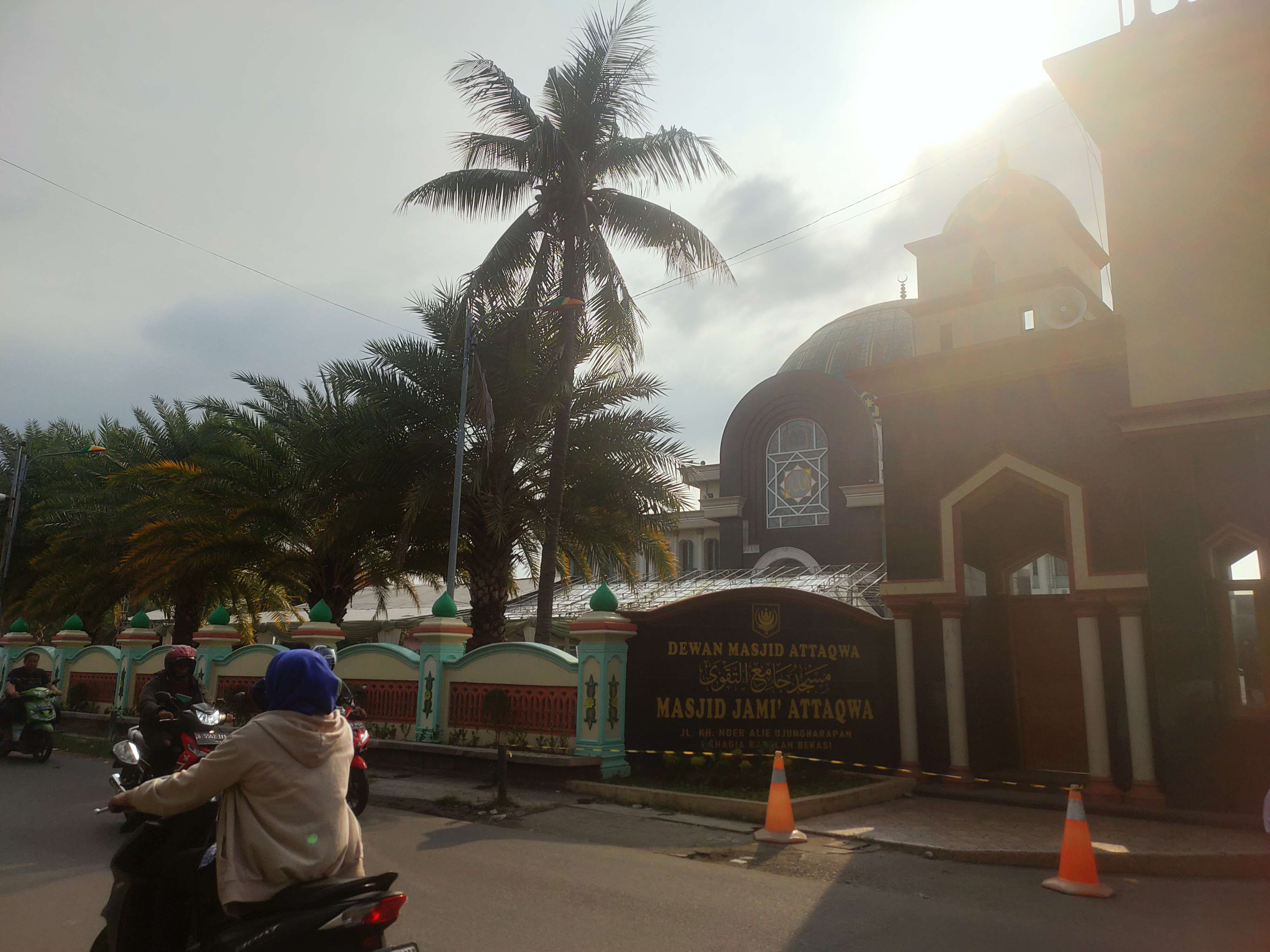
- View of Masjid Jami At-Taqwa
- Interactive map of Babelan
- Country: Indonesia
- Province: West Java
- Regency: Bekasi

Area
  - Total: 59.41 km^{2} (22.94 sq mi)

Population (mid 2024 estimate)
  - Total: 277,112
  - Density: 4,664/km^{2} (12,080/sq mi)
- Time zone: UTC+7 (Indonesia Western Time)

Babelan is a town and an administrative district (kecamatan) of Bekasi Regency, in West Java, Indonesia. The district covers an area of 59.41 km^{2}, and had a population of 209,564 at the 2010 Census and 270,050 at the 2020 Census; the official estimate as at mid 2024 was 277,112 - comprising 140,031 males and 137,081 females. The administrative centre is located at Babelan Kota, and the district is sub-divided into two towns (kelurahan) - Bahagia and Kebalen - and seven villages (desa), all sharing the postcode 17610, as listed below with their areas and their populations as at mid 2024.

Kode Wilayah	Name of Desa	Area in km^{2}	Population mid 2024 estimate
32.16.02.2001	Bunibakti	7.79	11,684
32.16.02.2002	Muarabakti	5.31	13,013
32.16.02.2003	Kedung Pengawas	5.88	21,882
32.16.02.2004	Huripjaya	11.00	4,899
32.16.02.2005	Pantai Hurip	5.69	5,059
32.16.02.1006	Bahagia (town)	6.18	94,294
32.16.02.1007	Kebalen (town)	4.56	60,337
32.16.02.2008	Babelan Kota	6.67	49,993
32.16.02.2009	Kedungjaya	6.63	15,951
32.16.02	Totals	59.41	277,112

== Notable people ==
- Noer Alie (1914–1992)
