= Kedungwaringin =

- Town and District
- Interactive map of Kedungwaringin
- Country: Indonesia
- Province: West Java
- Regency: Bekasi
- Established: 11 January 1992

Area
  - Total: 28.28 km^{2} (10.92 sq mi)

Population (mid 2024 estimate)
  - Total: 80,928
  - Density: 2,862/km^{2} (7,412/sq mi)
- Time zone: UTC+7 (Indonesia Western Time)

Kedungwaringin is a town and an administrative district (kecamatan) of Bekasi Regency, in West Java, Indonesia.

Kedungwaringin was previously part of Cikarang and Lemahabang (now East Cikarang) districts before it were split off from the eastern part of each districts, respectively in 1992.

The district covers an area of 28.28 km^{2}, and had a population of 55,654 at the 2010 Census and 69,437 at the 2020 Census; the official estimate as at mid 2024 was 80,928 - comprising 41,131 males and 39,797 females. The administrative centre is located at the town of Kedungwaringin, and the district is sub-divided into seven villages (desa), all sharing the postcode of 17540, as listed below with their areas and their populations as at mid 2024.

Kode Wilayah	Name of Desa	Area in km^{2}	Population mid 2024 estimate
32.16.12.2001	Karangsambung	3.80	10,454
32.16.12.2002	Waringinjaya	5.60	19,550
32.16.12.2003	Karangmekar	4.49	9,730
32.16.12.2004	Mekarjaya	5.12	8,624
32.16.12.2005	Karangharum	3.39	5,358
32.16.12.2006	Bojongsari	3.60	9,323
32.16.12.2007	Kedungwaringin (town)	2.28	17,889
32.16.12	Totals	28.28	80,928
