= Sukakarya, Bekasi =

Sukakarya
- Town and District
- Interactive map of Sukakarya
- Country: Indonesia
- Province: West Java
- Regency: Bekasi

Area
  - Total: 43.14 km^{2} (16.66 sq mi)

Population (mid 2024 estimate)
  - Total: 59,407
  - Density: 1,377/km^{2} (3,567/sq mi)
- Time zone: UTC+7 (Indonesia Western Time)

Sukakarya is a town and an administrative district (kecamatan) of Bekasi Regency, in West Java, Indonesia (not to be confused with the district of the same name in Sabang city). The district covers an area of 43.14 km^{2}, and had a population of 42,468 at the 2010 Census and 52,016 at the 2020 Census; the official estimate as at mid 2024 was 59,407, comprising 30,103 males and 29,304 females. The administrative centre is located at the town of Sukakarya, and the district is sub-divided into seven villages (desa), all sharing the postcode of 17630, as listed below with their areas and their populations as at mid 2024.

Kode Wilayah	Name of Desa	Area in km^{2}	Population mid 2024 estimate
32.16.14.2001	Sukamurni	6.16	9,421
32.16.14.2002	Sukaindah	7.22	9,176
32.16.14.2003	Sukakarya	5.48	6,842
32.16.14.2004	Sukalaksana	7.01	8,564
32.16.14.2005	Sukajadi	6.50	12,330
32.16.14.2006	Sukakersa	5.61	3,305
32.16.14.2007	Sudamakmur	5.16	9,769
32.16.14	Totals	43.14	59,407
