= Central Cikarang =

Central Cikarang Cikarang Pusat
- District

Regional transcription(s)
  - Sundanese: ᮎᮤᮊᮛᮀ ᮕᮥᮞᮒ᮪
- Location in Java and Indonesia Central Cikarang (Indonesia)
- Coordinates: 6°21′32″S 107°10′54″E
- Country: Indonesia
- Province: West Java
- Regency: Bekasi Regency
- Established: 2001

Government
  - Camat: Endin Syamsudin
  - Secretary: Sugiman

Area
  - Total: 44.00 km^{2} (16.99 sq mi)
- Elevation: 59 m (194 ft)

Population (mid 2024 estimate)
  - Total: 71,493
  - Density: 1,625/km^{2} (4,208/sq mi)
- Time zone: UTC+7 (IWT)
- Postal code: 17531
- Area code: (+62) 21
- Villages: 6
- Website: Official website

Central Cikarang (Indonesian: Cikarang Pusat; Sundanese: ᮎᮤᮊᮛᮀ ᮕᮥᮞᮒ᮪) is a district of Bekasi Regency which serves as the regency seat. It covers an area of 44 km^{2} and had a population of 71,493 (comprising 35,719 males and 35,774 females) as at mid 2024. The district was established in 2001, as a result of division of the former Lemahabang and Serang Districts into four new districts. The district was previously known as Karangjati. Geographically, Central Cikarang is located southeast of the other Cikarang districts, however it is named Central Cikarang to emphasize its importance as the administrative center of Bekasi Regency.

== Administrative divisions ==
Central Cikarang is divided into six administrative villages (desa) which are as follows:

Kode Wilayah	Name of Kelurahan or Desa	Area in km^{2}	Population mid 2024 estimate
32.16.20.2001	Cicau	9.0	8,314
32.16.20.2002	Sukamahi	9.0	9,900
32.16.20.2003	Pasirranji	9.0	4,681
32.16.20.2004	Hegarmukti	7.0	16,858
32.16.20.2005	Jayamukti	5.0	22,540
32.16.20.2006	Pasirtanjung	5.0	9,200
32.16.20	Central Cikarang	44.00	71,493

== See also ==
- Cikarang
