= Majalengka =

- District

Regional transcription(s)
  - Sundanese: ᮙᮏᮜᮦᮀᮊ
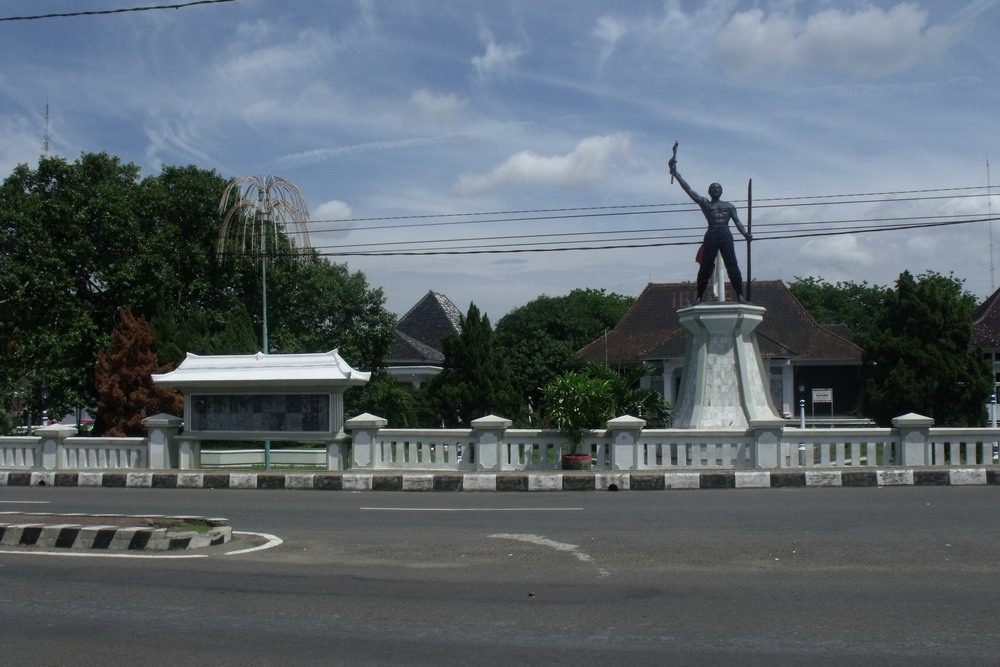
- Gedung Juang (Building of Struggle)

- Location in Majalengka Regency, Java and Indonesia Majalengka (Java) Majalengka (Indonesia)
- Coordinates: 6°50′7″S 108°13′40″E
- Country: Indonesia
- Province: West Java
- Regency: Majalengka Regency

Government
  - Camat: Andik Sujarwo
  - Secretary: Sutaryo

Area
  - Total: 57.00 km^{2} (22.01 sq mi)
- Elevation: 141 m (463 ft)

Population (mid 2024 estimate)
  - Total: 74,107
  - Density: 1,300/km^{2} (3,367/sq mi)
- Time zone: UTC+7 (IWT)
- Postal code: 4541x
- Area code: (+62) 233
- Villages: 14
- Website: Official website

Majalengka (Sundanese: ᮙᮏᮜᮦᮀᮊ) is a town and district in West Java, Indonesia. The district is the regency seat of Majalengka Regency. At the 2010 Census, the district had a population of 68,871, of which the town (comprising the two kelurahan of Majalengka Wetan and Majalengka Kulon) had a population of 20,906. At the 2020 Census, the town population had decreased to 20,549, while the district had 74,107 inhabitants in mid 2024.

In Rajaguluh, one of the villages in Majalengka, 20 km (12 mi) from the town of Majalengka, there is a traditional food called "pedesan bebek", which is considered a little bit spicy.

== Administrative divisions ==
Majalengka consists of 14 villages (kelurahan or desa) which are as follows:

- Babakan Jawa
- Cibodas
- Cicurug
- Cijati
- Cikasarung
- Kawunggirang
- Kulur
- Majalengka Kulon
- Majalengka Wetan
- Munjul
- Sidamukti
- Sindangkasi
- Tarikolot
- Tonjong

== Toll Road Access ==
KM	Toll Road	Toll Gate	Destination
159	Cikopo-Palimanan Toll Road	Kertajati	Kertajati; Majalengka; Sumedang

== Education ==
Public institutions:

- Universitas Majalengka

Private institutions:

- SEAPIN / STT STAPIN Majalengka

== Climate ==
Majalengka has a tropical monsoon climate (Am) with moderate rainfall from June to October and heavy to very heavy rainfall from November to May.

Climate data for Majalengka
Month	Jan	Feb	Mar	Apr	May	Jun	Jul	Aug	Sep	Oct	Nov	Dec	Year
Mean daily maximum °C (°F)	30.6 (87.1)	30.5 (86.9)	30.8 (87.4)	31.3 (88.3)	31.6 (88.9)	31.6 (88.9)	31.6 (88.9)	32.3 (90.1)	32.9 (91.2)	33.2 (91.8)	32.1 (89.8)	31.3 (88.3)	31.7 (89.0)
Daily mean °C (°F)	26.1 (79.0)	26.0 (78.8)	26.2 (79.2)	26.6 (79.9)	26.8 (80.2)	26.5 (79.7)	26.4 (79.5)	26.7 (80.1)	27.0 (80.6)	27.3 (81.1)	27.0 (80.6)	26.6 (79.9)	26.6 (79.9)
Mean daily minimum °C (°F)	21.7 (71.1)	21.6 (70.9)	21.7 (71.1)	21.9 (71.4)	22.0 (71.6)	21.4 (70.5)	21.2 (70.2)	21.1 (70.0)	21.1 (70.0)	21.5 (70.7)	21.9 (71.4)	21.9 (71.4)	21.6 (70.9)
Average rainfall mm (inches)	499 (19.6)	414 (16.3)	450 (17.7)	277 (10.9)	183 (7.2)	95 (3.7)	75 (3.0)	44 (1.7)	43 (1.7)	111 (4.4)	272 (10.7)	408 (16.1)	2,871 (113)
Source: Climate-Data.org
