= Pebayuran =

- District
- Interactive map of Pebayuran
- Country: Indonesia
- Province: West Java
- Regency: Bekasi

Area
  - Total: 83.04 km^{2} (32.06 sq mi)

Population (mid 2024 estimate)
  - Total: 114,442
  - Density: 1,378/km^{2} (3,569/sq mi)
- Time zone: UTC+7 (Indonesia Western Time)

Pebayuran is an administrative district (kecamatan) of Bekasi Regency in the province of West Java, Indonesia. The district covers an area of 83.04 km^{2}, and had a population of 92,821 at the 2010 Census and 102,285 at the 2020 Census; the official estimate as at mid 2024 was 114,442, comprising 57,938 males and 56,504 females. The administrative centre is located at Kertasari, and the district is sub-divided into thirteen villages (desa), all sharing the postcode of 17710, as listed below with their areas and their populations as at mid 2024.

== Administrative divisions ==
Kode Wilayah	Name of Desa	Area in km^{2}	Population mid 2024 estimate
32.16.13.2001	Karangharja	9.71	8,463
32.16.13.2002	Karangsegar	9.74	5,925
32.16.13.2003	Sumberurip	3.15	6,120
32.16.13.2004	Sumberreja	5.76	6,584
32.16.13.2005	Karangreja	6.26	10,706
32.16.13.2006	Karangjaya	10.68	8,506
32.16.13.2007	Sumbersari	5.17	7,501
32.16.13.2008	Karangpatri	10.75	11,052
32.16.13.2009	Karanghaur	3.03	4,537
32.16.13.2010	Kertajaya	4.19	10,095
32.16.13.2011	Kertasari	4.04	10,782
32.16.13.2012	Bantarsari	5.30	6,324
32.16.13.2013	Bantarjaya	5.26	17,847
32.16.13	Totals	83.04	114,442
