= Sukawangi =

- Town and District
- Interactive map of Sukawangi
- Country: Indonesia
- Province: West Java
- Regency: Bekasi

Area
  - Total: 60.99 km^{2} (23.55 sq mi)

Population (mid 2024 estimate)
  - Total: 56,699
  - Density: 929.6/km^{2} (2,408/sq mi)
- Time zone: UTC+7 (Indonesia Western Time)

Sukawangi is a town and an administrative district (kecamatan) of Bekasi Regency, in West Java, Indonesia. The district covers an area of 60.99 km^{2}, and had a population of 43,119 at the 2010 Census and 49,649 at the 2020 Census; the official estimate as at mid 2024 was 56,699 - comprising 28,785 males and 27,914 females. The administrative centre is located at the town of Sukawangi, and the district is sub-divided into 7 villages (desa), all sharing a post-code of 17720, as listed below with their areas and their populations as at mid 2024.

Kode Wilayah	Name of Desa	Area in km^{2}	Population mid 2024 estimate
32.16.03.2001	Sukaringin	7.73	5,569
32.16.03.2002	Sukabudi	4.52	6,792
32.16.03.2003	Sukadaya	9.41	7,967
32.16.03.2004	Sukawangi (town)	34.42	4,673
32.16.03.2005	Sukakerta	11.62	8,734
32.16.03.2006	Sukatenang	12.12	12,956
32.16.03.2007	Sukamekar	12.65	10,008
32.16.03	Totals	60.99	56,699
