= Leuwisadeng =

- Town and District
- Location in Bogor Regency, Java and Indonesia Leuwisadeng (Java) Leuwisadeng (Indonesia)
- Coordinates: 6°33′59″S 106°35′40″E
- Country: Indonesia
- Province: West Java
- Regency: Bogor Regency

Area
  - Total: 31.85 km^{2} (12.30 sq mi)
- Elevation: 229 m (751 ft)

Population (mid 2024 estimate)
  - Total: 86,001
  - Density: 2,700/km^{2} (6,993/sq mi)
- Time zone: UTC+7 (IWST)
- Area code: (+62) 251
- Vehicle registration: F
- Villages: 8
- Website: kecamatanleuwisadeng.bogorkab.go.id

Leuwisadeng is a town and an administrative district (Indonesian: kecamatan) in the Bogor Regency, West Java, Indonesia and thus part of Jakarta's metropolitan area.

Leuwisadeng District covers an area of 31.85 km^{2}, and had a population of 70,847 at the 2010 Census and 77,382 at the 2020 Census; the official estimate as at mid 2024 was 86,001 (comprising 44,909 males and 41,092 females). The administrative centre is at the town of Leuwisadeng, and the district is sub-divided into eight villages (desa), all sharing the postcode of 16641, as listed below with their areas and populations as at mid 2024.

Kode Wilayah	Name of desa	Area in km^{2}	Population mid 2024 estimate
32.01.39.2004	Wangun Jaya	2.66	9,235
32.01.39.2003	Sadeng Kolot	4.01	14,626
32.01.39.2001	Leuwisadeng (town)	7.36	14,761
32.01.39.2008	Sibanteng	6.40	11,980
32.01.39.2002	Babakan Sadeng	2.47	10,060
32.01.39.2007	Sadeng	3.96	12,304
32.01.39.2006	Kalong II	1.55	7,350
32.01.39.2005	Kalong I	3.44	5,685
32.01.39	Totals	31.85	86,001
