= Cibarusah =

- District
- Interactive map of Cibarusah
- Country: Indonesia
- Province: West Java
- Regency: Bekasi

Area
  - Total: 37.00 km^{2} (14.29 sq mi)
- Elevation: 121 m (397 ft)

Population (mid 2024 estimate)
  - Total: 108,600
  - Density: 2,935/km^{2} (7,602/sq mi)
- Time zone: UTC+7 (Indonesia Western Time)

Cibarusah is an administrative district (kecamatan) of Bekasi Regency, in West Java, Indonesia. The district covers an area of 37.00 km^{2}, and had a population of 74,587 at the 2010 Census and 94,802 at the 2020 Census; the official estimate as at mid 2024 was 108,600, comprising 55,215 males and 53,385 females. The administrative centre is located at the town of Cibarusah Kota, and the district is sub-divided into seven villages (desa), all sharing a postcode of 17340, as listed below with their areas and their populations as at mid 2024.

Kode Wilayah	Name of Desa	Area in km^{2}	Population mid 2024 estimate
32.16.22.2006	Cibarusah Jaya	3.94	15,781
32.16.22.2005	Cibarusah Kota	2.33	19,557
32.16.22.2007	Sindangmulya	5.91	40,084
32.16.22.2004	Wibawamulya	5.42	12,571
32.16.22.2001	Sirnajati	5.46	10,607
32.16.22.2002	Ridogalih	8.94	6,625
32.16.22.2003	Ridomanah	5.00	3,375
32.16.22	Totals	37.00	108,600
