= Bojongmangu =

- District
- Interactive map of Bojongmangu
- Country: Indonesia
- Province: West Java
- Regency: Bekasi

Area
  - Total: 50.18 km^{2} (19.37 sq mi)

Population (mid 2024 estimate)
  - Total: 31,383
  - Density: 625.4/km^{2} (1,620/sq mi)
- Time zone: UTC+7 (Indonesia Western Time)

Bojongmangu is an administrative district (kecamatan) of Bekasi Regency, in West Java, Indonesia. The district covers an area of 50.18 km^{2}, and had a population of 25,033 at the 2010 Census and 27,821 at the 2020 Census; the official estimate as at mid 2024 was 31,383 - comprising 15,673 males and 15,710 females. The administrative centre is located at the town of Bojongmangu, and the district is sub-divided into six villages (desa), as listed below with their areas, their populations as at mid 2024, and their postcodes.

Kode Wilayah	Name of Desa	Area in km^{2}	Population mid 2024 estimate	Post code
32.16.23.2002	Karangindah	7.41	3,689	17350
32.16.23.2001	Karangmulya	9.94	5,779	17356
32.16.23.2003	Bojongmangu	12.72	5,935	17352
32.16.23.2006	Medalkrisna	5.14	4,105	17350
32.16.23.2005	Sukamukti	8.35	4,776	17350
32.16.22.2004	Sukabungah	6.62	7,099	17350
32.16.23	Totals	50.18	31,383	
