= Medansatria =

Coordinates: 6°15′20″S 106°58′07″E

- District
- Location in Bekasi, Java and Indonesia Medansatria (Java) Medansatria (Indonesia)
- Country: Indonesia
- Province: West Java
- City: Bekasi

Area
  - Total: 13.21 km^{2} (5.10 sq mi)

Population (mid 2023 estimate)
  - Total: 158,729
  - Density: 12,020/km^{2} (31,120/sq mi)
- Time zone: UTC+7 (IWST)
- Area code: (+62) 21
- Vehicle registration: B
- Villages: 6
- Website: kec-medansatria.bekasikota.go.id

Medansatria or Medan Satria is one of the twelve administrative districts (kecamatan) within the city municipality of Bekasi, in Jabodetabek (Jakarta's metropolitan area) on the island of Java, Indonesia. The district covers an area of 1,321 hectares (3,264 acres), and had a population of 161,121 at the 2010 Census and 162,119 at the 2020 Census; the official estimate as at mid 2023 was 158,729 - comprising 79,840 males and 78,889 females.

The administrative centre is located in Medansatria kelurahan, and the district is sub-divided into four urban "villages" or communities (kelurahan), as listed below with their areas and their populations as at mid 2023, together with their postcodes.

Kode Wilayah	Name of kelurahan	Area in km^{2}	Population mid 2023 estimate	Post code
32.75.06.1001	Medansatria (kelurahan)	3.85	28,114	17132
32.75.06.1002	Harapan Mulya	2.06	24,408	17143
32.75.06.1003	Pejuang	5.89	75,510	17131
32.75.06.1004	Kali Baru	1.41	30,697	17133
32.75.06	Totals	13.21	158,729	
