= Serang Baru =

- District
- Interactive map of Serang Baru
- Country: Indonesia
- Province: West Java
- Regency: Bekasi

Area
  - Total: 51.42 km^{2} (19.85 sq mi)
- Elevation: 87 m (285 ft)

Population (mid 2024 estimate)
  - Total: 167,864
  - Density: 3,265/km^{2} (8,455/sq mi)
- Time zone: UTC+7 (Indonesia Western Time)

Serang Baru is an administrative district (kecamatan) of Bekasi Regency, in West Java Province of Indonesia. The district covers an area of 51.42 km^{2}, and had a population of 103,587 at the 2010 Census and 149,727 at the 2020 Census; the official estimate as at mid 2024 was 167,864, comprising 64,996 males and 82,868 females. The administrative centre is located at the town of Sukasari, and the district is sub-divided into eight villages (desa), all sharing a postcode of 17330, as listed below with their areas and their populations as at mid 2024.

Kode Wilayah	Name of Desa	Area in km^{2}	Population mid 2024 estimate
32.16.21.2004	Jayamulya	6.23	16,569
32.16.21.2001	Sukaragam	5.15	54,453
32.16.21.2002	Sirnajaya	5.92	16,185
32.16.21.2005	Nagacipta	5.05	5,378
32.16.21.2006	Nagasari	7.87	5,233
32.16.21.2007	Cilangkara	5.15	6,765
32.16.21.2003	Sukasari	7.05	39,469
32.16.21.2008	Jayasampurna	9.00	23,812
32.16.21	Totals	51.42	167,864
