= Karangbahagia =

- Town and District
- Interactive map of Karangbahagia
- Country: Indonesia
- Province: West Java
- Regency: Bekasi

Area
  - Total: 38.55 km^{2} (14.88 sq mi)

Population (mid 2024 estimate)
  - Total: 141,677
  - Density: 3,675/km^{2} (9,519/sq mi)
- Time zone: UTC+7 (Indonesia Western Time)

Karangbahagia is a town and an administrative district (kecamatan) of Bekasi Regency, in West Java, Indonesia. The district covers an area of 38.55 km^{2}, and had a population of 90,654 at the 2010 Census and 123,238 at the 2020 Census; the official estimate as at mid 2024 was 141,677 - comprising 71,831 males and 69,846 females. The administrative centre is located at the town of Karangbahagia, and the district is sub-divided into eight villages (desa), all sharing the postcode of 17535, as listed below with their areas and their populations as at mid 2024.

Kode Wilayah	Name of Desa	Area in km^{2}	Population mid 2024 estimate
32.16.10.2001	Sukaraya	3.36	55,260
32.16.10.2002	Karangrahayu	4.71	13,749
32.16.10.2003	Karangsetia	4.20	9,688
32.16.10.2004	Karanganyar	4.30	15,175
32.16.10.2005	Karangbahagia (town)	3.80	7,239
32.16.10.2006	Karangsentosa	4.00	18,904
32.16.10.2007	Karangsatu	7.38	10,525
32.16.10.2008	Karangmukti	6.80	11,137
32.16.10	Totals	38.55	141,677
