= Cibitung, Bekasi =

Cibitung
- District
- Interactive map of Cibitung
- Coordinates: 6°15′11″S 107°05′23″E
- Country: Indonesia
- Province: West Java
- Regency: Bekasi

Area
  - Total: 35.79 km^{2} (13.82 sq mi)

Population (mid 2024 estimate)
  - Total: 276,183
  - Density: 7,717/km^{2} (19,990/sq mi)
- Time zone: UTC+7 (Indonesia Western Time)

Cibitung is an administrative district (kecamatan) of Bekasi Regency, in West Java, Indonesia - not to be confused with the district of the same name in Sukabumi Regency. The district covers an area of 35.79 km^{2}, and had a population of 195,566 at the 2010 Census and 242,557 at the 2020 Census; the official estimate as at mid 2024 was 276,183, comprising 139,578 males and 136,605 females. The administrative centre is located at the town of Wanasari, and the district is sub-divided into one town (kelurahan) - Wanasari - and six villages (desa), all sharing a post-code of 17520, as listed below with their areas and their populations as at mid 2024.

Kode Wilayah	Name of kelurahan or desa	Area in km^{2}	Population mid 2024 estimate
32.16.07.1001	Wanasari	5.73	107,648
32.16.07.2002	Wanajaya	4.48	55,891
32.16.07.2003	Kertamukti	5.86	18,989
32.16.07.2004	Muktiwari	3.94	27,756
32.16.07.2005	Sarimukti	5.47	5,899
32.16.07.2006	Sukajaya	4.72	34,478
32.16.07.2007	Cibuntu	5.60	25,522
32.16.07	Totals	35.79	276,183
