= Gunungsindur =

- Town and District
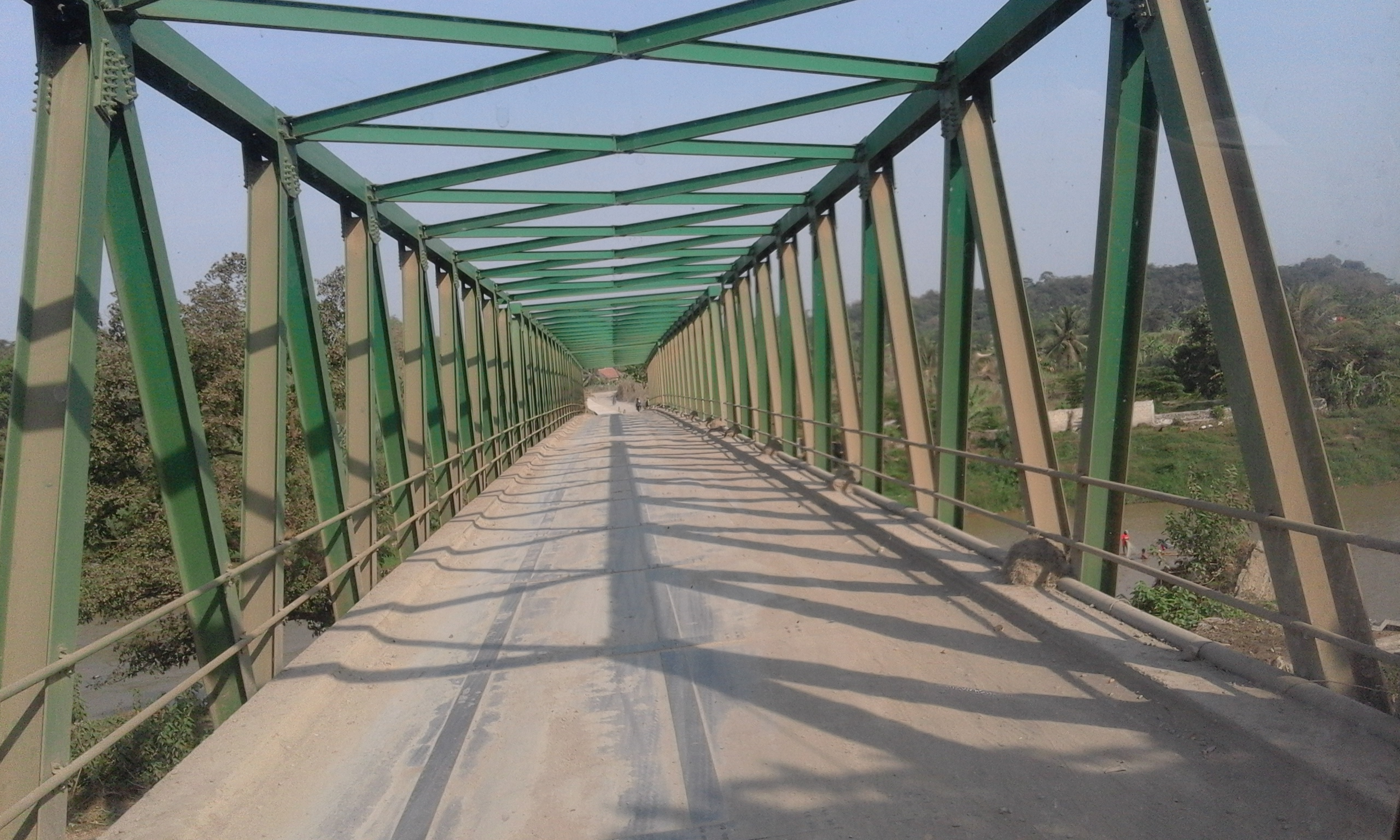
- Leuwiranji Bridge in Cisadane River near Rumpin.

- Location in Bogor Regency, Java and Indonesia Gunungsindur (Java) Gunungsindur (Indonesia)
- Coordinates: 6°23′10″S 106°41′30″E
- Country: Indonesia
- Province: West Java
- Regency: Bogor Regency

Area
  - Total: 44.70 km^{2} (17.26 sq mi)
- Elevation: 58 m (190 ft)

Population (mid 2024 estimate)
  - Total: 128,867
  - Density: 2,883/km^{2} (7,467/sq mi)
- Time zone: UTC+7 (IWST)
- Area code: (+62) 251
- Vehicle registration: F
- Villages: 10
- Website: kecamatangunungsindur.bogorkab.go.id

Gunungsindur is a town and an administrative district (Indonesian: kecamatan) in the Bogor Regency, West Java, Indonesia and thus part of Jakarta's larger conurbation.

== Demographics ==
Language map in Gunungsindur district.

The population of Gunungsindur district is generally of the Betawi and Sundanese ethnic groups as well as the Chinese ethnic group in quite significant numbers, especially spread across the villages of Gunungsindur and Pabuaran. The regional languages spoken in Gunungsindur district are the Betawi and Sundanese languages.

=== Sundanese language ===
The Sundanese language is generally spoken by the majority of the people in the villages of Gunungsindur and Jampang. Meanwhile in the villages of Cibadung and Pabuaran, Sundanese is also spoken by a number of speakers that is quite balanced with Betawi speakers. The exact number of speakers is not known, but is likely around 30–45% of the population of Gunungsindur district. The Sundanese language spoken in Gunungsindur district has many similarities in vocabulary with Banten Sundanese, especially the Tangerang dialect, which is characterized by the use of words jasa 'very' and nyana 'he'.

=== Betawi language ===
The Betawi language is generally spoken in almost all villages in Gunungsindur District, except in the villages of Jampang and Gunungsindur where the residents speak Sundanese. The Betawi language used is the Betawi Ora dialect which has similarities to the Betawi language spoken in Parung district.

== Population ==
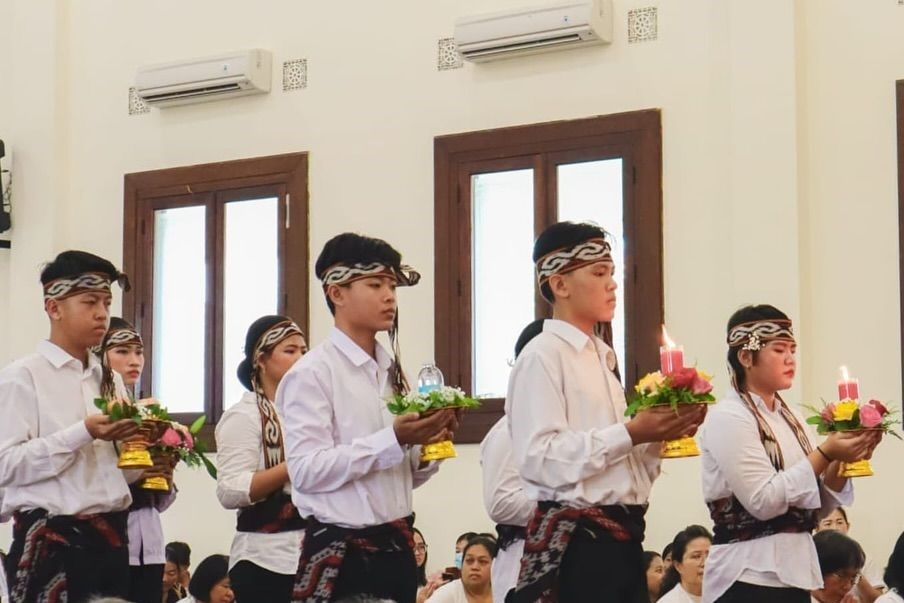
Worship on Vesak Day at Vipassana Giriratana Temple, Gunungsindur.

Gunungsindur District covers an area of 44.70 km^{2}, and had a population of 102,998 at the 2010 Census and 126,834 at the 2020 Census; the official estimate as at mid 2024 was 128,867 (comprising 65,456 males and 63,411 females). The administrative centre is at the town of Gunungsindur, and the district is sub-divided into ten villages (desa), all sharing the postcode of 16340, as listed below with their areas and populations as at mid 2024.

== Administrative division ==
Region Code	Name of desa	Area in km^{2}	Population mid 2024 estimate
32.01.11.2006	Jampang	5.89	5,508
32.01.11.2007	Cibadung	4.73	10,796
32.01.11.2008	Cibinong	4.49	17,356
32.01.11.2001	Cidokom	2.21	10,296
32.01.11.2002	Padurenan	2.41	10,254
32.01.11.2004	Curug	6.00	18,977
32.01.11.2009	Rawakalong	4.42	17,044
32.01.11.2003	Pengasinan	4.76	14,124
32.01.11.2005	Gunungsindur (town)	4.76	13,824
32.01.11.2010	Pabuaran	5.03	10,688
32.01.11	Totals	44.70	128,867
