= South Tambun =

South Tambun Tambun Selatan
- Town and District
- Interactive map of South Tambun
- Country: Indonesia
- Province: West Java
- Regency: Bekasi

Area
  - Total: 37.12 km^{2} (14.33 sq mi)
- Elevation: 19 m (62 ft)

Population (mid 2024 estimate)
  - Total: 450,469
  - Density: 12,140/km^{2} (31,430/sq mi)
- Time zone: UTC+7 (Indonesia Western Time)

South Tambun (Indonesian: Tambun Selatan) is a town and an administrative district (kecamatan) of Bekasi Regency, in West Java, Indonesia. The district covers an area of 37.12 km^{2}, and had a population of 417,008 at the 2010 Census and 431,038 at the 2020 Census; the official estimate as at mid 2024 was 450,469, comprising 226,099 males and 224,370 females. The administrative centre is located at the town of Tambun, and the district is sub-divided into one town (kelurahan) - Jatimulya - and nine villages (desa), all sharing a post-code of 17510, as listed below with their areas and their populations as at mid 2024.

Kode Wilayah	Name of kelurahan or desa	Area in km^{2}	Population mid 2024 estimate
32.16.06.1001	Jatimulya	5.67	75,272
32.16.06.2002	Lambangsari	3.65	16,225
32.16.06.2003	Lambangjaya	2.56	10,047
32.16.06.2004	Tambun (town)	2.98	27,542
32.16.06.2005	Setiadarma	1.61	17,949
32.16.06.2006	Setiamekar	5.67	58,343
32.16.06.2007	Mekarsari	2.08	40,454
32.16.06.2008	Tridayasakti	3.25	36,951
32.16.06.2009	Mangunjaya	3.51	77,146
32.16.06.2010	Sumberjaya	6.13	90,540
32.16.06	Totals	37.12	450,469
