= Sukatani, Bekasi =

Sukatani
- District
- Interactive map of Sukatani
- Country: Indonesia
- Province: West Java
- Regency: Bekasi

Area
  - Total: 34.38 km^{2} (13.27 sq mi)

Population (mid 2024 estimate)
  - Total: 109,028
  - Density: 3,171/km^{2} (8,214/sq mi)
- Time zone: UTC+7 (Indonesia Western Time)

Sukatani is an administrative district (kecamatan) of Bekasi Regency, in West Java, Indonesia (not to be confused with the district of the same name in Purwakarta Regency). The district covers an area of 34.38 km^{2}, and had a population of 70,299 at the 2010 Census and 93,491 at the 2020 Census; the official estimate as at mid 2024 was 109,028 - comprising 55,202 males and 53,826 females. The administrative centre is located at the town of Sukamulya, and the district is sub-divided into seven villages (desa), all sharing the postcode of 17631, as listed below with their areas and their populations as at mid 2024.

Kode Wilayah	Name of Desa	Area in km^{2}	Population mid 2024 estimate
32.16.15.2001	Sukamulya	3.86	19,329
32.16.15.2002	Sukamanah	6.40	25,057
32.16.15.2003	Sukahurip	7.17	12,231
32.16.15.2004	Sukaasih	5.85	7,908
32.16.15.2005	Sukarukun	1.18	21,955
32.16.15.2006	Banjarsari	7.55	11,226
32.16.15.2007	Sudadarma	2.37	11,322
32.16.15	Totals	34.38	109,028
