= Tarumajaya =

- District
- Interactive map of Tarumajaya
- Country: Indonesia
- Province: West Java
- Regency: Bekasi

Area
  - Total: 44.12 km^{2} (17.03 sq mi)

Population (mid 2024 estimate)
  - Total: 133,039
  - Density: 3,015/km^{2} (7,810/sq mi)
- Time zone: UTC+7 (Indonesia Western Time)

Tarumajaya is an administrative district (kecamatan) of Bekasi Regency, in West Java, Indonesia. The district covers an area of 44.12 km^{2}, and had a population of 109,296 at the 2010 Census and 132,756 at the 2020 Census; the official estimate as at mid 2024 was 133,039 - comprising 67,363 males and 65,676 females. The administrative centre is located at Pantai Makmur, and the district is sub-divided into one town (kelurahan) - Setia Asah - and seven villages (desa), as listed below with their areas, their populations as at mid 2024 and their postcodes.

Kode Wilayah	Name of Desa	Area in km^{2}	Population mid 2024 estimate	Post code
32.16.01.2001	Segaramakmur	6.25	14,803	17211
32.16.01.2002	Segarajaya	6.65	19,605	17218
32.16.01.2003	Pusakarakyat	6.72	17,193	17214
32.16.01.2004	Pahlawansetia	0.45	15,209	17216
32.16.01.2005	Setiamulya	5.16	13,563	17213
32.16.01.2006	Samudrajaya	7.52	8,312	17217
32.16.01.2007	Setiaasih (town)	6.92	33,472	17215
32.16.01.2008	Pantaimakmur	4.45	10,882	17212
32.16.01	Totals	44.12	133,039	
