= Rancabungur =

- Town and District
- Location in Bogor Regency, Java and Indonesia Rancabungur (Java) Rancabungur (Indonesia)
- Coordinates: 6°31′30″S 106°42′50″E
- Country: Indonesia
- Province: West Java
- Regency: Bogor Regency

Area
  - Total: 24.36 km^{2} (9.41 sq mi)
- Elevation: 153 m (502 ft)

Population (mid 2024 estimate)
  - Total: 66,513
  - Density: 2,730/km^{2} (7,072/sq mi)
- Time zone: UTC+7 (IWST)
- Area code: (+62) 251
- Vehicle registration: F
- Villages: 7
- Website: kecamatanrancabungur.bogorkab.go.id

Rancabungur is a town and an administrative district (Indonesian: kecamatan) in the Bogor Regency, West Java, Indonesia and thus part of Jakarta's larger conurbation.

Rancabungur District covers an area of 24.36 km^{2}, and had a population of 50,052 at the 2010 Census and 60,711 at the 2020 Census; the official estimate as at mid 2024 was 66,513 (comprising 34,031 males and 32,482 females). The administrative centre is at the town of Rancabungur, and the district is sub-divided into seven villages (desa), all sharing the postcode of 16311, as listed below with their areas and populations as at mid 2024.

Kode Wilayah	Name of desa	Area in km^{2}	Population mid 2024 estimate
32.01.34.2005	Mekarsari	2.04	8,423
32.01.34.2004	Rancabungur (town)	2.70	12,842
32.01.34.2003	Pasirgaok	3.41	10,692
32.01.34.2001	Bantarjaya	2.14	12,645
32.01.34.2002	Bantarsari	3.41	8,075
32.01.34.2006	Candali	6.32	6,518
32.01.34.2007	Cimulang	4.34	7,318
32.01.34	Totals	24.36	66,513
