= Setu, Bekasi =

Setu District Kecamatan Setu
- District
- Interactive map of Setu District
- Country: Indonesia
- Province: West Java
- Regency: Bekasi

Area
  - Total: 54.97 km^{2} (21.22 sq mi)
- Elevation: 64 m (210 ft)
- Highest elevation: 135 m (443 ft)
- Lowest elevation: 42 m (138 ft)

Population (mid 2024 estimate)
  - Total: 180,705
  - Density: 3,287/km^{2} (8,514/sq mi)
- Time zone: UTC+7 (Indonesia Western Time)

Setu is an administrative district (kecamatan) of Bekasi Regency, in West Java, Indonesia. The district covers an area of 54.57 km^{2}, and had a population of 111,670 at the 2010 Census and 173,656 at the 2020 Census; the official estimate as at mid 2024 was 180,705, comprising 90,746 males and 89,959 females. The administrative centre is located at the town of Lubangbuaya, and the district is sub-divided into eleven villages (desa), all sharing a postcode of 17320, as listed below with their areas and their populations as at mid 2024.

Kode Wilayah	Name of Desa	Area in km^{2}	Population mid 2024 estimate
32.16.18.2009	Ragemmanunggal	4.35	7,336
32.16.18.2010	Muktijaya	5.03	7,727
32.16.18.2011	Kertarahayu	7.87	8,040
32.16.18.2008	Cikarageman	6.09	13,541
32.16.18.2006	Tamansari	5.63	12,776
32.16.18.2007	Tamanrahayu	3.59	14,599
32.16.18.2003	Burangkeng	5.73	32,196
32.16.18.2004	Cileduk	4.26	24,868
32.16.18.2005	Cibening	5.49	15,141
32.16.18.2001	Cijengkol	2.73	17,669
32.16.18.2002	Lubangbuaya	3.80	26,812
32.16.18	Totals	54.57	180,705
