= Cabangbungin =

- District
- Interactive map of Cabangbungin
- Country: Indonesia
- Province: West Java
- Regency: Bekasi

Area
  - Total: 47.79 km^{2} (18.45 sq mi)

Population (mid 2024 estimate)
  - Total: 62,664
  - Density: 1,311/km^{2} (3,396/sq mi)
- Time zone: UTC+7 (Indonesia Western Time)

Cabangbungin is an administrative district (kecamatan) of Bekasi Regency, in West Java, Indonesia. The district covers an area of 47.79 km^{2}, and had a population of 47,844 at the 2010 Census and 55,488 at the 2020 Census; the official estimate as at mid 2024 was 62,664, comprising 31,724 males and 30,940 females. The administrative centre is located at Lenggahjaya, and the district is sub-divided into eight villages (desa), all sharing the postcode of 17720, as listed below with their areas and their populations as at mid 2024.

Kode Wilayah	Name of Desa	Area in km^{2}	Population mid 2024 estimate
32.16.16.2001	Jayabakti	7.90	11,848
32.16.16.2002	Jayalaksana	4.28	7,172
32.16.16.2003	Sindangsari	4.50	5,960
32.16.16.2004	Sindangjaya	4.49	7,272
32.16.16.2005	Setialaksana	3.39	8,498
32.16.16.2006	Setiajaya	7.79	6,514
32.16.16.2007	Lenggahjaya	5.79	9,867
32.16.16.2008	Lenggahsari	9.65	5,533
32.16.16	Totals	47.79	62,664
