= North Tambun =

North Tambun Tambun Utara
- District
- Interactive map of North Tambun
- Country: Indonesia
- Province: West Java
- Regency: Bekasi

Area
  - Total: 29.67 km^{2} (11.46 sq mi)

Population (mid 2024 estimate)
  - Total: 209,212
  - Density: 7,051/km^{2} (18,260/sq mi)
- Time zone: UTC+7 (Indonesia Western Time)

North Tambun (Indonesian: Tambun Utara) is an administrative district (kecamatan) of Bekasi Regency, in West Java, Indonesia. The district covers an area of 29.67 km^{2}, and had a population of 137,099 at the 2010 Census and 194,405 at the 2020 Census; the official estimate as at mid 2024 was 209,212, comprising 105,523 males and 103,689 females. The administrative centre is located at the town of Sriamur, and the district is sub-divided into eight villages (desa), all sharing a postcode of 17511, as listed below with their areas and their populations as at mid 2024.

Kode Wilayah	Name of Desa	Area in km^{2}	Population mid 2024 estimate
32.16.05.2001	Satriajaya	3.02	11,002
32.16.05.2002	Jalenjaya	3.02	13,037
32.16.05.2003	Satriamekar	4.50	68,561
32.16.05.2004	Sriamur	3.64	24,908
32.16.05.2005	Srimukti	3.16	26,192
32.16.05.2006	Srijaya	4.08	32,403
32.16.05.2007	Srimahi	4.59	13,801
32.16.05.2008	Karangsatria	3.66	19,308
32.16.05	Totals	29.67	209,212
