= Ciseeng =

- Town and District
- Location in Bogor Regency, Java and Indonesia Ciseeng (Java) Ciseeng (Indonesia)
- Coordinates: 6°27′S 106°41′E
- Country: Indonesia
- Province: West Java
- Regency: Bogor Regency

Area
  - Total: 40.16 km^{2} (15.51 sq mi)
- Elevation: 125 m (410 ft)

Population (mid 2024 estimate)
  - Total: 127,664
  - Density: 3,179/km^{2} (8,233/sq mi)
- Time zone: UTC+7 (IWST)
- Area code: (+62) 251
- Vehicle registration: F
- Villages: 10
- Website: kecamatanciseeng.bogorkab.go.id

Ciseeng is a town and an administrative district (Indonesian: kecamatan) in the Bogor Regency, West Java, Indonesia and thus part of Jakarta's larger conurbation.

Ciseeng District covers an area of 40.16 km^{2}, and had a population of 98,227 at the 2010 Census and 110,592 at the 2020 Census; the official estimate as at mid 2024 was 127,664 (comprising 65,591 males and 62,073 females). The administrative centre is at the town of Cibentang, and the district is sub-divided into ten villages (desa), all sharing the postcode of 16120, as listed below with their areas and populations as at mid 2024.

Kode Wilayah	Name of desa	Area in km^{2}	Population mid 2024 estimate
32.01.33.2006	Karihkil	4.55	13,137
32.01.33.2005	Cibeuteung Udik	3.80	12,734
32.01.33.2007	Babakan	4.70	16,990
32.01.33.2001	Putat Nutug	4.75	17,156
32.01.33.2009	Cibeuteung Muara	5.35	14,874
32.01.33.2004	Cibentang	5.20	12,572
32.01.33.2003	Parigi Mekar	1.90	10,050
32.01.33.2002	Ciseeng (town)	2.06	9,043
32.01.33.2008	Cihowe	2.35	7,863
32.01.33.2010	Kuripan	5.50	13,245
32.01.33	Totals	40.16	127,664
