= Bekasi Regency =

Regency in West Java, Indonesia

Bekasi Regency Kabupaten Bekasi
- Regency

Other transcription(s)
  - Betawi: Bekasih Kabupatèn
  - Sundanese: ᮊᮘᮥᮕᮒᮦᮔ᮪ ᮘᮨᮊᮞᮤ
- Coat of arms
- Motto: Swatantra Wibawa Mukti (Self-reliant, Prestigious, joyous)
- Location within West Java

- Location in Java and Indonesia Bekasi Regency (Indonesia)
- Coordinates: 6°21′57″S 107°10′23″E
- Country: Indonesia
- Province: West Java
- Founded: 15 August 1950; 76 years ago
- Regency seat: Central Cikarang

Government
  - Regent: Asep Surya Atmaja (act.)
  - Vice Regent: Akhmad Marjuki (act.)

Area
  - Total: 1,273.88 km^{2} (491.85 sq mi)
- Elevation: 20 m (66 ft)
- Highest elevation: 140 m (460 ft)
- Lowest elevation: 0 m (0 ft)

Population (mid 2025 Estimate)
  - Total: 3,331,400
  - Density: 2,615.2/km^{2} (6,773.2/sq mi)
- Time zone: UTC+7 (Indonesia Western Time)
- Area code: (+62) 21
- Vehicle registration: B xxxx Fxx
- Website: bekasikab.go.id

Bekasi Regency (Indonesian: Kabupaten Bekasi; Betawi: Bekasih Kabupatèn; Sundanese: ᮊᮘᮥᮕᮒᮦᮔ᮪ ᮘᮨᮊᮞᮤ, romanized: Kabupatén Bekasi) is a regency (kabupaten) of West Java Province, Indonesia. Its regency seat is in the district of Central Cikarang. It is bordered by Jakarta Special Region (the administrative cities of North Jakarta and East Jakarta) and by Bekasi City (which is a separate administration from the Regency) to the west, by Bogor Regency to the south, by Karawang Regency to the east and by the Java Sea to the north.

This highly urbanised area (largely suburban to Jakarta to its west) has a land area of 1,273.88 km^{2} (491.85 sq mi) and contained 2,630,401 people at the 2010 Census and 3,113,017 at the 2020 Census, with an average density of 2,570 inhabitants per square kilometre (6,700/sq mi). The official estimate as of mid-2025 was 3,331,400 (comprising 1,683,152 males and 1,648,248 females), making it the fourth most populous regency in Indonesia after Bogor Regency, Bandung Regency and Tangerang Regency. The figures for Bekasi Regency exclude the area and population of the separate City of Bekasi (with 2,648,272 inhabitants in mid 2025), which lies between the Regency and Jakarta, and has been independent of the Regency since 16 December 1996.

The earliest evidence of the existence of Bekasi dates from the 5th century according to the Tugu inscription, which describes the name of two rivers that run through the city, i.e. Candrabhaga and Gomati and one of those rivers, i.e. Candrabhaga is the origin of the name Bekasi where the name Candrabhaga evolved into Bhagasasi due to the Sanskrit word candra which means moon evolved into Old Javanese word 'sasi' which also means moon and then the name Bhagasasi was misspelled as Bhagasi and then Dutch colonial government also misspelled the name Bhagasi as Bacassie and finally it became Bekasi.

== History ==
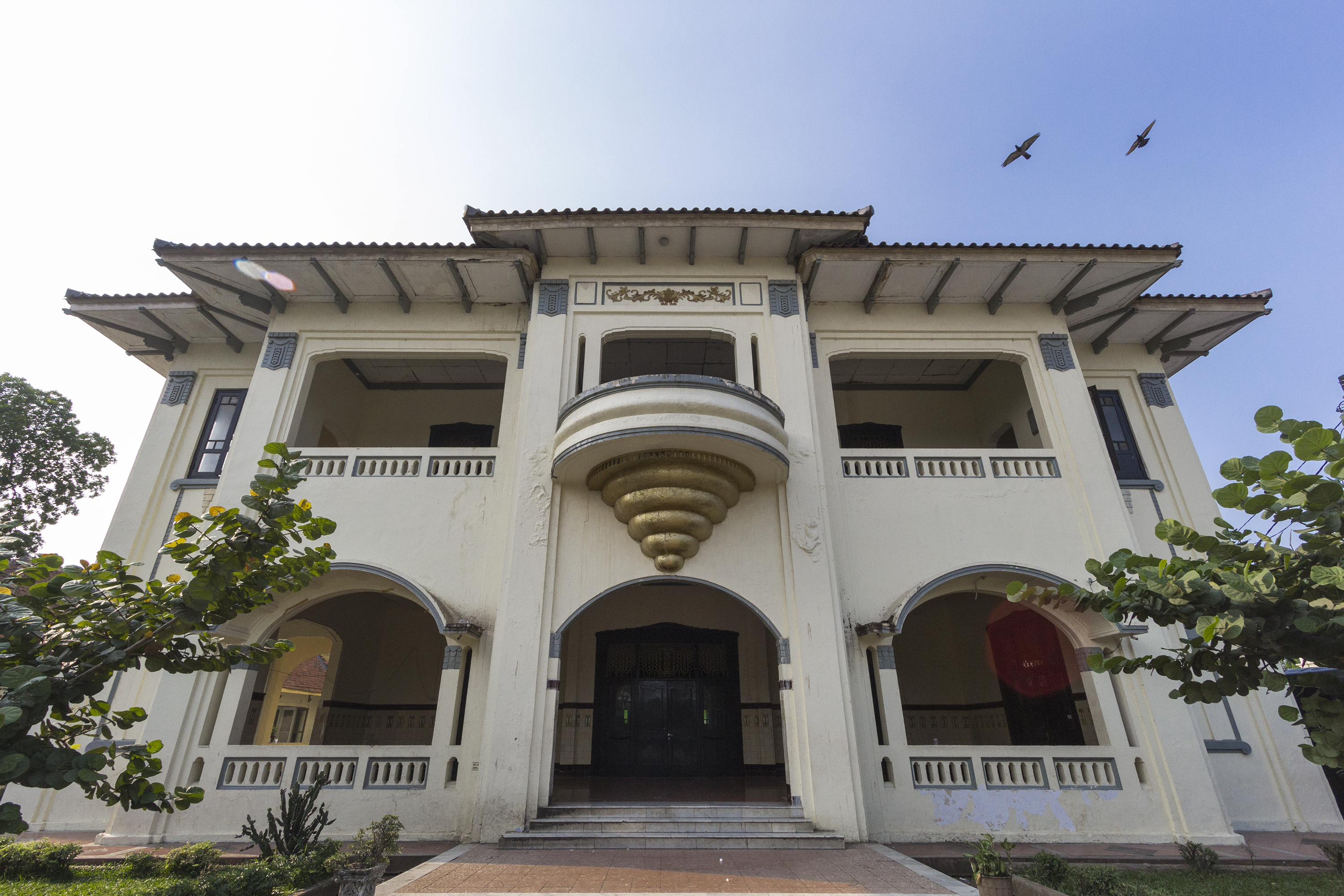
Tambun Struggle Building (Gedung Juang Tambun) in Bekasi Regency. Formerly a landlord's house, currently it houses Bekasi Museum

During the colonial era, Bekasi was dominated by particuliere landerijen ('private domains'; tanah partikelir) which came under the rule of Landheeren (landlords). The landlords could impose taxation (cuke), tribute (upeti) and force labor (rodi) on the inhabitants of their private estates.

Among the most powerful gentry families in Bekasi was the Khouw family of Tamboen (keluarga Khouw van Tamboen). They ruled their extensive landholdings from their country house, landhuis Tamboen (now Gedung Juang Tambun).

== Administrative districts ==
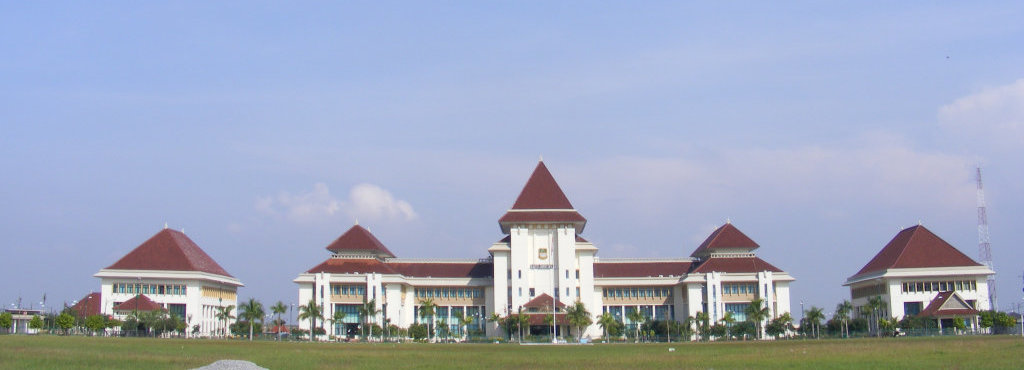
Bekasi Regency administration building

Bekasi Regency is divided into 23 districts (kecamatan), tabulated below with their areas and their populations at the 2010 Census and the 2020 Census, together with the official estimates for mid-2025. They are grouped in the table below (in non-official geographical sectors) to indicate the approximate position of the districts. The table also includes the locations of the district administrative centres, the number of administrative villages in each district (totalling 180 rural desa and 7 urban kelurahan), and their post codes.

Kode Wilayah	Name of District (kecamatan)	Area in km^{2}	Pop'n 2010 Census	Pop'n 2020 Census	Pop'n mid 2025 Estimate	Admin centre	No. of villages	Post code(s)
32.16.18	Setu	62.16	111,670	173,656	210,496	Lubangbuaya	11	17320
32.16.21	Serang Baru	63.80	103,587	149,527	174,834	Sukasari	8	17330
32.16.22	Cibarusah	50.39	74,587	94,802	104,228	Cibarusakota	7	17340
32.16.23	Bojongmangu	60.06	25,033	27,821	28,664	Bojongmangu	6	17350: 17356
	Southern sector	236.41	314,877	445,806	518,222		32	
32.16.20	Cikarang Pusat (Central Cikarang)	47.60	56,756	67,336	71,604	Sukamahi	6	17531
32.16.19	Cikarang Selatan (South Cikarang)	51.74	143,030	161,534	167,726	Sukadami	7	17532
32.16.11	Cikarang Timur (East Cikarang)	51.31	91,326	106,478	112,276	Jatibaru	8 ^{(a)}	17533
32.16.09	Cikarang Utara (North Cikarang)	43.30	230,563	228,937	224,123	Cikarangkota	11	17534
32.16.08	Cikarang Barat (West Cikarang)	53.69	211,578	205,333	201,015	Telaga Asih	11 ^{(b)}	17530
	Cikarang sector	247.64	733,253	769,618	776,744		43	
32.16.07	Cibitung	46.10	195,566	242,557	263,564	Wanasari	7 ^{(c)}	17520
32.16.06	Tambun Selatan (South Tambun)	43.10	417,008	431,038	428,784	Tambun	10 ^{(d)}	17510
32.16.05	Tambun Utara (North Tambun)	34.42	137,099	194,405	225,355	Sriamur	8	17511
	Tambun sector	123.62	749,673	868,000	917,703		25	
32.16.02	Babelan	63.60	209,564	270,050	298,884	Babelan Kota	9 ^{(e)}	17610
32.16.01	Tarumajaya	54.63	109,296	132,756	142,787	Pantai Makmur	8 ^{(f)}	17211: 17218
32.16.17	Muaragembong	140.09	35,503	40,321	41,980	Pantaimekar	6	17730
32.16.03	Sukawangi	67.19	43,119	49,649	52,037	Sukawangi	7	17620
	Northern sector	325.51	397,482	492,776	535,688		30	
32.16.16	Cabangbungin	49.70	47,844	55,488	58,360	Lenggahjaya	8	17720
32.16.13	Pebayuran	96.34	92,821	102,285	104,951	Kertasari	13	17710
32.16.14	Sukakarya	42.40	42,468	52,016	56,173	Sukakarya	7	17630
32.16.04	Tambelang	37.91	35,376	40,862	42,893	Sukarapih	7	17621
32.16.15	Sukatani	37.52	70,299	93,491	105,064	Sukamulya	7	17631
32.16.10	Karangbahagia	45.30	90,654	123,238	139,973	Karangbahagia	8	17535
32.16.12	Kedungwaringin	31.53	55,654	69,437	75,659	Kedungwaringin	7	17540
	Eastern sector	340.70	435,116	536,817	583,073		64	
	Total Regency	1,273.88	2,630,401	3,113,017	3,331,400		187	

Notes: (a) includes the kelurahan of Sertajaya. (b) includes the kelurahan of Telaga Asih. (c) includes the kelurahan of Wanasari.
(d) includes the kelurahan of Jatimulya. (e) includes the two kelurahan of Bahagia and Kebalen. (f) includes the kelurahan of Setia Asih.

== List of companies ==
=== Cikarang Pusat (Central Cikarang) District ===
- PT Suzuki Indomobil Motor

=== Cibitung District ===
- Panasonic
- PT Astra Honda Motor
- LG Electronics

=== Jababeka ===
- Samsung
- PT. Kraftfoods Indonesia
- Showa
- PT. Unilever Tbk.
- Kao Indonesia

=== EJIP ===
- Omron
- MEI ( Matsumoto Electronic Indonesia )
- Haier
- Musashi
- AISIN

=== BIIE ===
- LG Innotek Indonesia
- Enkei
- Sanoh

=== Newton Techno Park ===
- Guna Era
- Fata Metal
- Matahari Alka
- PPA (Priuk Perkasa Abadi)
- Takita

== Toll Road Access ==
KM	Toll Road	Toll Gate	Destination
21	Jakarta–Cikampek Toll Road	Tambun	Tambun, Mustika Jaya, Setu
24	Jakarta–Cikampek Toll Road	Cibitung	Cibitung, Industrial Complex
31	Jakarta–Cikampek Toll Road	Cikarang Barat	Cikarang, Industrial Complex, Lemahabang
34	Jakarta–Cikampek Toll Road	Cibatu	Cibatu, Jayamukti, Industrial Complex
37	Jakarta–Cikampek Toll Road	Cikarang Timur	Cikarang, Pasirranji, Sukamahi

== See also ==
- Bekasi river
