= Subdivisions of Indonesia =

Indonesia is divided into provinces (provinsi). Provinces are made up of regencies (kabupaten) and cities (kota). Regencies and cities then divided into districts (kecamatan), which made up of villages (desa) and urban villages (kelurahan). Provinces, regencies, and cities have their own local governments and parliamentary bodies (DPRD).

Since the enactment of Law Number 22 of 1999 on Local Government (the law was revised by Law Number 32 of 2004, Law Number 23 of 2014, and the 2023 Omnibus Law on Job Creation), local governments now play a greater role in administering their areas. Foreign policy, defence (including armed forces and national police), system of law, and monetary policy, however, remain the domain of the national government. Since 2005 as the enactment of Law Number 32 of 2004, heads of local government (governors, regents and mayors) have been directly elected by popular election for a five-year term and can be re-elected for one more term.

== First level ==
First level subdivisions of Indonesia are called Province. A province is headed by a governor (Gubernur). Each province has its own regional assembly, called Dewan Perwakilan Rakyat Daerah (DPRD, lit. 'Regional People's Representative Council'). Governors and representative members are elected by popular vote for five-year terms and can be re-elected for one additional consecutive or separated term. Provinces were formerly also known as Daerah Tingkat I (Level I Regions).

Indonesia is divided into 38 provinces. Nine provinces have special status:

- Special Regional Province of Jakarta: Jakarta is the largest city and de-facto capital of Indonesia. The Governor of Jakarta has the power to appoint and dismiss mayors and regent within the region. The local government is allowed to co-operate with other cities from other countries.
- Aceh: Aceh has greater role in local government, which includes its own Islamic Sharia law (for Muslim citizens), flag and provincial anthem, local political parties, and decisions or laws made by the central government which directly affect Aceh's administration must be referred to the local government or legislative body.
- Yogyakarta Special Region: The Sultan of Yogyakarta is de facto and de jure governor of Yogyakarta since he is given priority when electing the governor. For centuries, the Sultanate of Yogyakarta has reigned in the region. However, in the 2000s the central government proposed a law that required the governor to be popularly elected as in the other provinces, while still giving the sultan significant political power. Since 31 August 2012, the Law Number 13 of 2012 on Specialty of Yogyakarta Special Region has been approved by the central government and according to the act, Yogyakarta refuses to be a province but a region at province-level. Within the Special Region of Yogyakarta is also the Principality of Pakualaman. The Prince of Pakualaman is also a hereditary position, and serve as the Vice-Governor of Yogyakarta.
- All Provinces in Western New Guinea
  - Papua: Since 2001 the local government has a greater role. The governor is required to be of Papuan origins.
  - Central Papua: The Province split from Papua in 2022.
  - Highland Papua: The Province split from Papua in 2022; the only landlocked province in Indonesia.
  - South Papua: The Province split from Papua in 2022.
  - West Papua: The province split from Papua in 2003. A 2008 regulation by the national government confirms that special autonomy status in Papua also applies to West Papua.
  - Southwest Papua: The Province split from West Papua in 2022.

Provinces of Indonesia

== Second level ==
Second level subdivisions of Indonesia is regency (kabupaten) and city (kota). This subdivisions is a local level of government beneath the provincial level. However, they enjoy greater decentralisation of affairs than the provincial body, such as provision of public schools and public health facilities. They were formerly known collectively as Daerah Tingkat II (Level II Region).

Both regency and city are at the same level, having their own local government and legislative body. The difference between a regency and a city lies in differing demographics, size, and economics.

Generally the regency has a larger area than the city, and the city has non-agricultural economic activities. A regency is headed by a regent (bupati), and a city is headed by a mayor (wali kota). The regent or mayor and the representative council members are elected by popular vote for a five-year term for a maximum of two terms.

== Third level ==
Regencies and cities are divided into districts, which have several variations of terms:

- Kecamatan headed by a camat. A camat is a civil servant, responsible to the regent (in a regency) or to the mayor (in a city). Kecamatan are found in most parts of Indonesia.
- Distrik headed by a kepala distrik, are used in provinces within Western New Guinea.
- In the Special Region of Yogyakarta, kapanewon (for subdivisions of regencies), headed by a panewu, and kemantren (for subdivisions of Yogyakarta City), headed by a mantri pamong praja, are used.

== Fourth level ==
Districts are divided into desa (village) or kelurahan (urban village). Both desa and kelurahan are of a similar division level, but a desa enjoys more power in local matters than a kelurahan. An exception is Aceh, where districts are divided into mukim before being subdivided further into gampong.

=== Desa ===
In Indonesian, as in English, a village (desa) has rural connotations. In the context of administrative divisions, a desa can be defined as a body which has authority over the local people in accordance with acknowledged local traditions of the area. A desa is headed by a "head of village" (Indonesian: kepala desa), who is elected by popular vote.

Most Indonesian villages use the term "desa", but other terms are used in some regions:

- Gampong in Aceh
- Nagari in West Sumatra^{[a]}
- Dusun in Bungo Regency (Jambi)^{[b]}
- Kampung in some places in Indonesia:^{[c]}
  - Central Lampung, Mesuji, Tulang Bawang, Way Kanan, and West Tulangbawang regencies (Lampung)
  - Berau and West Kutai regencies (East Kalimantan)
  - Provinces in Western New Guinea
- Kuwu in Cirebon and Indramayu regencies (West Java)
- Pekon in Pringsewu, Tanggamus, and West Lampung regencies (Lampung)
- In Bali, there are two forms of "desa", i.e. desa dinas (service village) and desa adat (cultural village). Desa dinas deals with administrative functions, while desa adat deals with religious and cultural functions.
- Lembang in Toraja and North Toraja regencies (South Sulawesi)
- Kalurahan in Special Region of Yogyakarta.

Notes

- ^{^[a]} except Mentawai Islands Regency
- ^{^[b]} In other places, "dusun" is an administrative division form below "desa".
- ^{^[c]} In other places, "kampung" is equal with "dusun", except in Bungo, Jambi.

=== Kelurahan ===
Although desa and kelurahan are part of a district, a kelurahan has less autonomy than a desa. A kelurahan is headed by a lurah. Lurahs are civil servants, directly responsible to their camats.

== Statistics ==
The following table lists the number of administrative subdivisions in Indonesia as of February 2025.

Level	Type (Indonesian)	Type (English)	Head of government (Indonesian)	Head of government (English)	Number
–	Wilayah	Region			7
I	Provinsi	Province	Gubernur	Governor	38
II	Kabupaten	Regency	Bupati	Regent	416
II	Kota	City	Wali Kota	Mayor	98
III	Kecamatan, distrik, kapanewon, or kemantren	District	Camat, kepala distrik, panewu or mantri pamong praja	Head of district	7,288
IV	Desa or kelurahan	Village/subdistrict	Kepala desa or lurah	Head of village/subdistrict	84,048

== See also ==
- List of Indonesian floral emblems
- Provinces of Indonesia
