= German Indonesians =

Ethnic group in Indonesia

German Indonesian Deutsche in Indonesien Orang Jerman di Indonesia
- (Germany) (Indonesia)

Total population
- 19,879 Recorded (2020)

Regions with significant populations
- Jakarta, Bali, Bogor, Puncak, Surabaya

Languages
- Indonesian, German

Religion
- Christianity (Lutheranism, Roman Catholic, Protestantism, Calvinism), Islam (Sunni), Irreligious, Judaism

Related ethnic groups
- Dutch people, German diaspora, Indo people

German Indonesians are people of German ancestry who had settled in the Dutch East Indies (now Indonesia), or German nationals who are residing in the country. There are 19,879 Germans in Indonesia as of 2020. The majority of them are found in Jakarta, Bogor, Puncak, Bali and Surabaya.

== History ==
There is a long history between Germans and Indonesians, dating back to the 16th century when German traders travelling on Dutch and Portuguese ships came to what was then known as the East Indies. During the Company rule of the Dutch East India Company (VOC) thousands of Germans came to Indonesia making them one of the most significant European population in the colony, after the Dutch and the Portuguese, both as administrative employees under the Dutch Colony, as well as engineers, researchers, technical scientists and German soldiers. Most infamously the Württemberg Regiment. The Württemberg Regiment, also known as the Contract Army, was a regiment of Germans from Württemberg who were contracted into the Royal Netherlands East Indies Army in 1790–1808. The Württemberg regiment numbered around 2,000 soldiers, many Christian missionaries who are active in the colony at the time are also Germans.

In the nineteenth century, German-speaking European physicians constituted the largest group of non-Dutch European physicians in the Dutch East Indies. In the nineteenth century, more than 300 German, Swiss, and Austro-Hungarian medical practitioners served in the Dutch colonial health service, with the majority joining the medical corps of the Dutch Colonial Army (KNIL) and others serving in the comparatively small colonial civil health service.

German industry has been present in Indonesia since the mid-19th century. After 1945, German entrepreneurs, German experts in development cooperation as well as in education and research, and intensive academic exchanges continued the good relations between Germany and Indonesia. German schools are also present in the country, such as the German School Jakarta.

== Notable German Indonesians ==
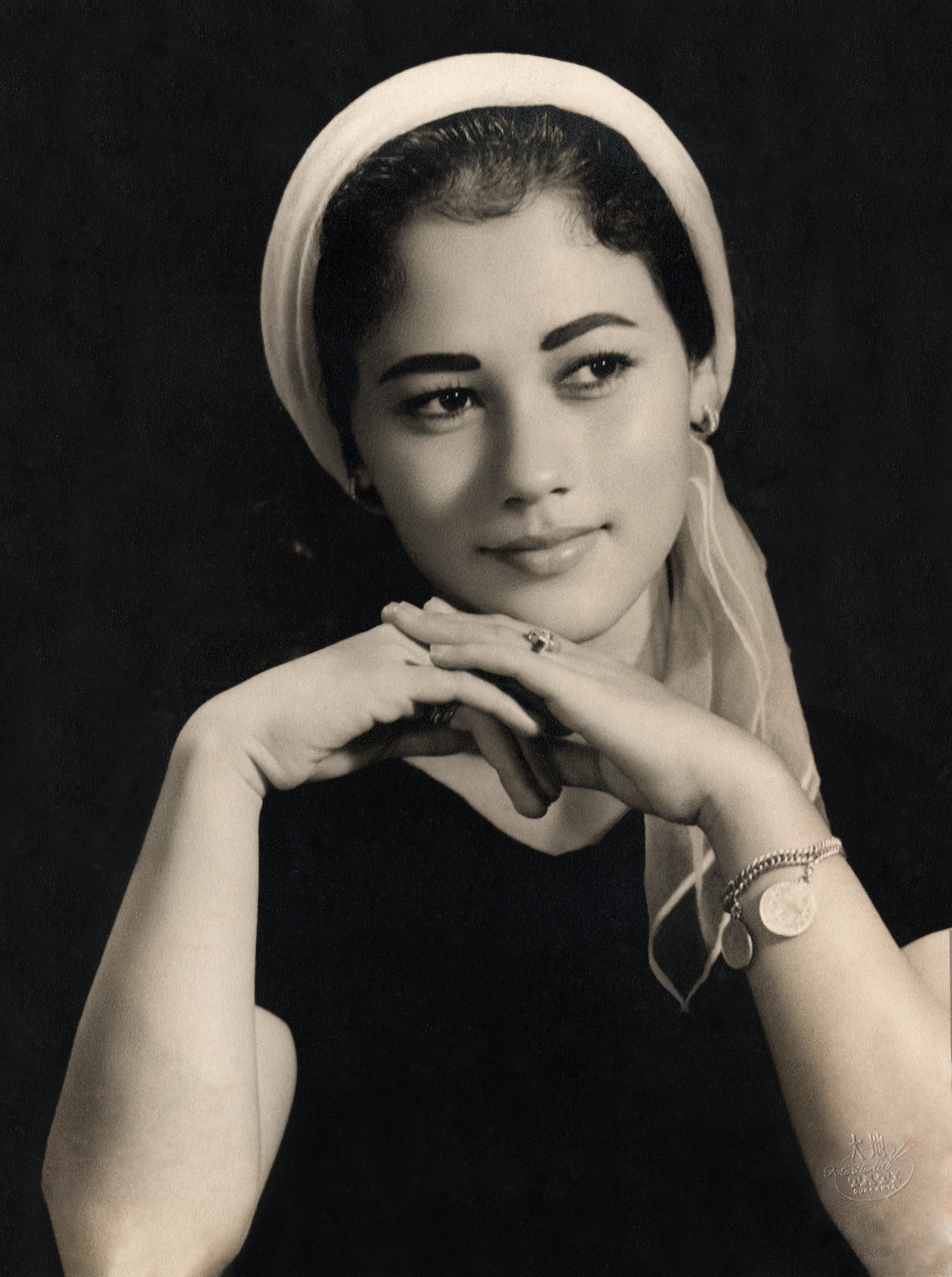
Suzzanna, the Queen of Indonesian Horror, is of German descent

- Meriam Bellina, actress
- Camelia Malik, actress and dangdut singer
- Arifin Putra, actor
- Chintami Atmanagara, actress, singer and entrepreneur
- Melanie Berentz, actress, TV commercial model, and beauty pageant titleholder
- Dora Marie Sigar, activist and nurse, Mother of the 8th President of Indonesia, Prabowo Subianto
- Eva Celia, actress and Jazz musician
- Marcel Chandrawinata, actress and model
- Franz Wilhelm Junghuhn, German-born botanist and geologist who is active in the Dutch East Indies
- Friedrich Carl Andreas, orientalist
- Karel Bosscha, philanthropist and entrepreneur, founder of the Technische Hoogeschool te Bandoeng
- Marintan Sirait, Performance artist
- Nadine Chandrawinata, actress, award-winning film producer, model and beauty pageant titleholder
- Ahmad Dhani, Rock musician
- Adipati Dolken, actor and brand-ambassador
- Pieter Erberveld, Eurasian resident of Batavia, who was accused of plotting a rebellion with local Javanese
- Clara Shafira Krebs, beauty pageant, model and entrepreneur
- Megan Domani, actor
- Marsha Timothy, actress and model
- Ernest Douwes Dekker (half-Indo), national hero and political figure in the Indonesian freedom movement.
- Nino Fernandez, actor
- Baby Huwae, actress, model, and singer
- Rachel Maryam, actress, model and politician
- Walter Spies, primitivist painter, composer, musicologist, and curator
- Johannes Emde, evangelist and missionary
- Johann Friedrich Riedel and Johann Gottlieb Schwarz, evangelist and missionary to the Minahasan people of Sulawesi
- Cinta Laura, singer, actress, and model
- Franz Magnis-Suseno, Jesuit priest and philosopher
- Zaskia Adya Mecca, actress
- Agnez Mo, musician
- L. B. Moerdani, ABRI Commander
- Rukmini Sukarno, opera singer
- Carissa Putri, actor and model
- Fajar Legian Siswanto, Indonesian footballer
- Ludwig Ingwer Nommensen, Lutheran missionary to Batak lands, founder of the Batak Christian Protestant Church
- Jonas Rivanno (half-Ambonese-Chinese), actor
- Nicholas Saputra, actor and film producer
- Brandon Scheunemann, footballer
- Claudia Scheunemann, footballer
- Timo Scheunemann, Indonesian association football manager
- Fajar Legian Siswanto, footballer
- Maya Soetoro-Ng, Indonesian-American academic and the maternal half-sister of Barack Obama, the 44th president of the United States.
- Christian Sugiono, actor and model
- Rima Melati Adams, actress
- Sophia Latjuba, actress, model and singer
- Kim Kurniawan, professional footballer
- Suzzanna, actress
- Nafa Urbach, musician, actress and politician
- S. Waldy, celebrated stage and film actor
- Masniari Wolf, swimmer, gold medalist in the 2021 and 2023 SEA Games
- Felix Viktor Iberle, swimmer, gold medalist in the 2023 SEA Games and World Junior Championships

== See also ==
- Germany–Indonesia relations
- German diaspora
- Ethnic groups in Indonesia
