= Tanah Abang =

District in Central Jakarta Administrative City, Indonesia

Tanah Abang Tanah Abang
- District
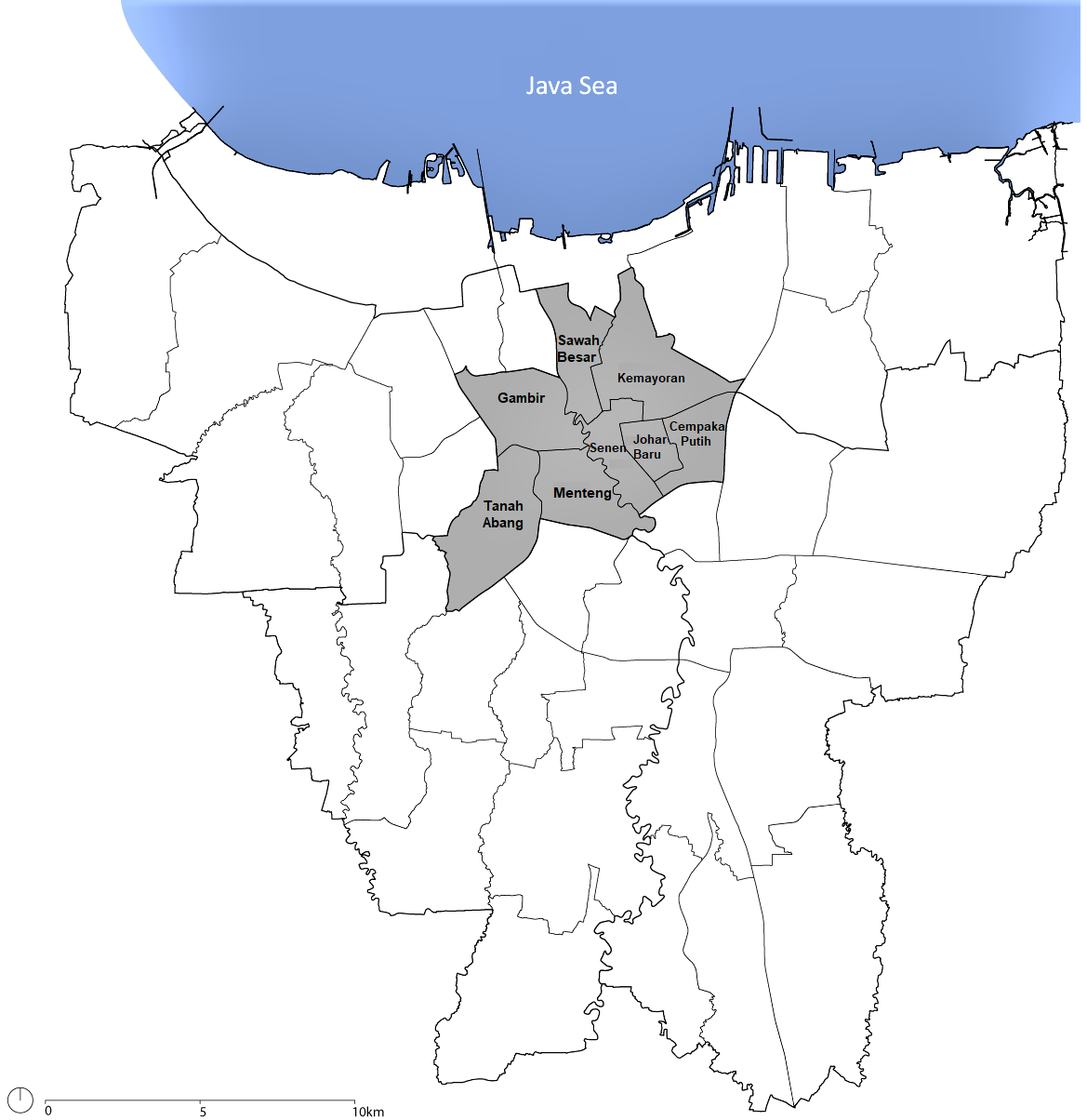
- Country: Indonesia
- Province: Jakarta
- Administrative city: Central Jakarta

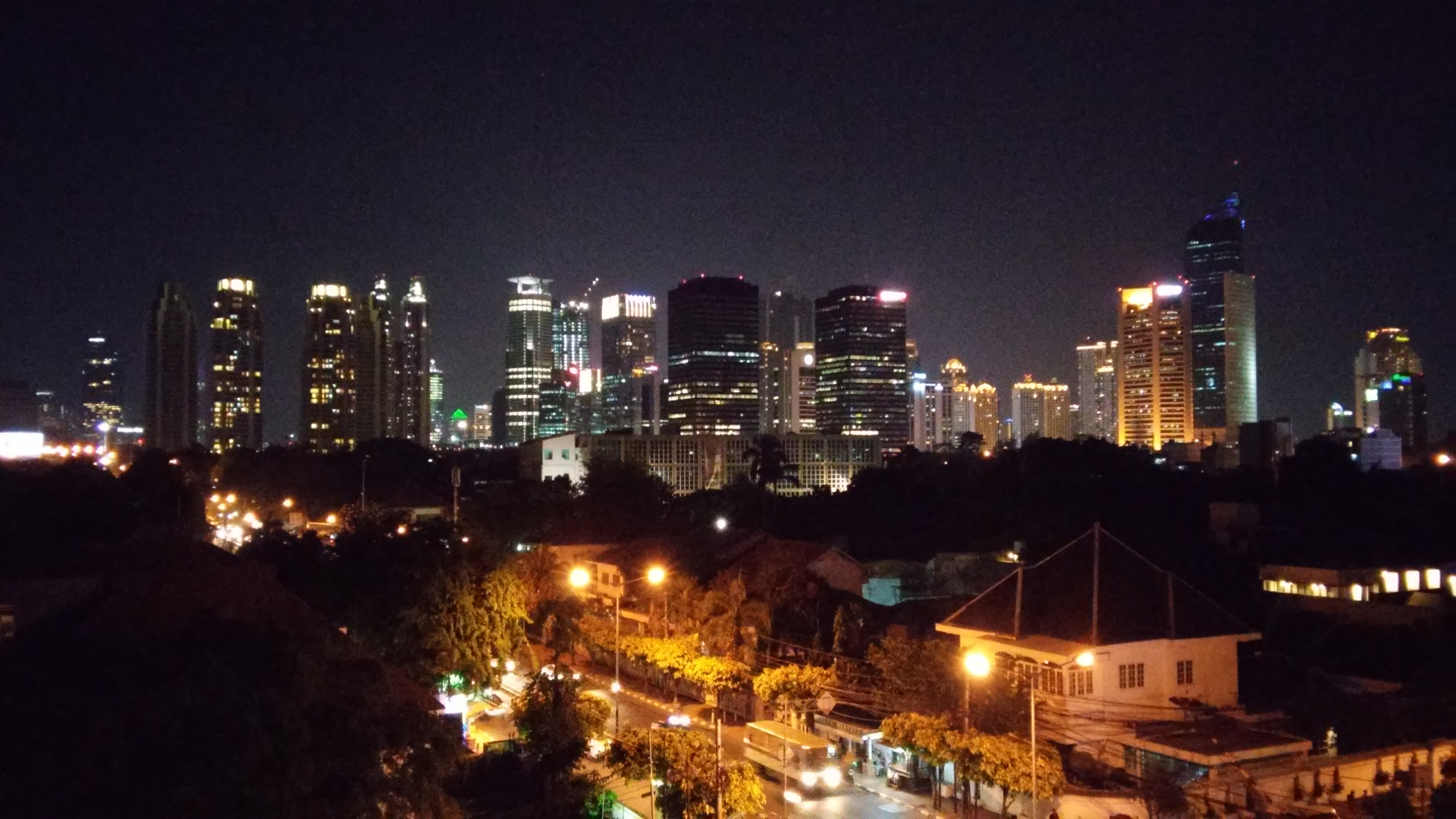
The western half of Sudirman Central Business District is in Tanah Abang District, Central Jakarta.

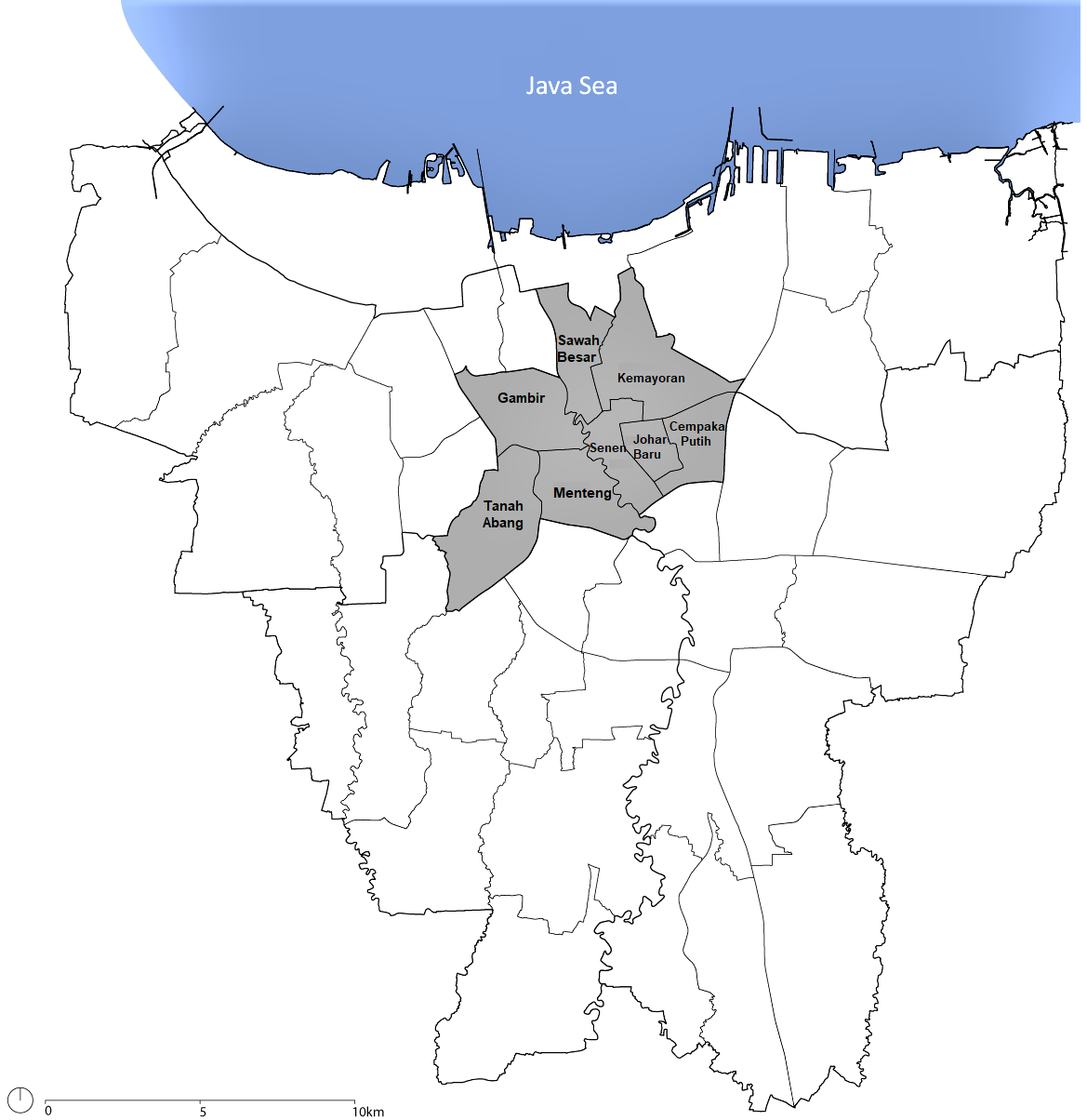
Map of Central Jakarta; Tanah Abang is the district furthest south. Click for broader map and to enable varied magnification.

Tanah Abang (lit. 'Laterite') is a district of Central Jakarta, Indonesia. The district hosts the biggest textile market in Southeast Asia, Tanah Abang Market. It also hosts Gelora Bung Karno Stadium in Kelurahan Gelora and the western half of the largely skyscraper-dominated Sudirman Central Business District.

== Namesakes ==
It is also the name of two historic roads in Kelurahan South Petojo, Gambir District. One of these roads, Tanah Abang 1, hosts the old Dutch Cemetery, now partly a museum, Museum Taman Prasasti, and the burial place of Olivia Mariamne Devenish, Eurasian wife of Stamford Raffles.

Contrary to what is colloquially stated, the city's important Textile Museum is in West Jakarta (Kelurahan Kota Bambu Selatan, Palmerah District), just over the western border.

== Tanah Abang market ==
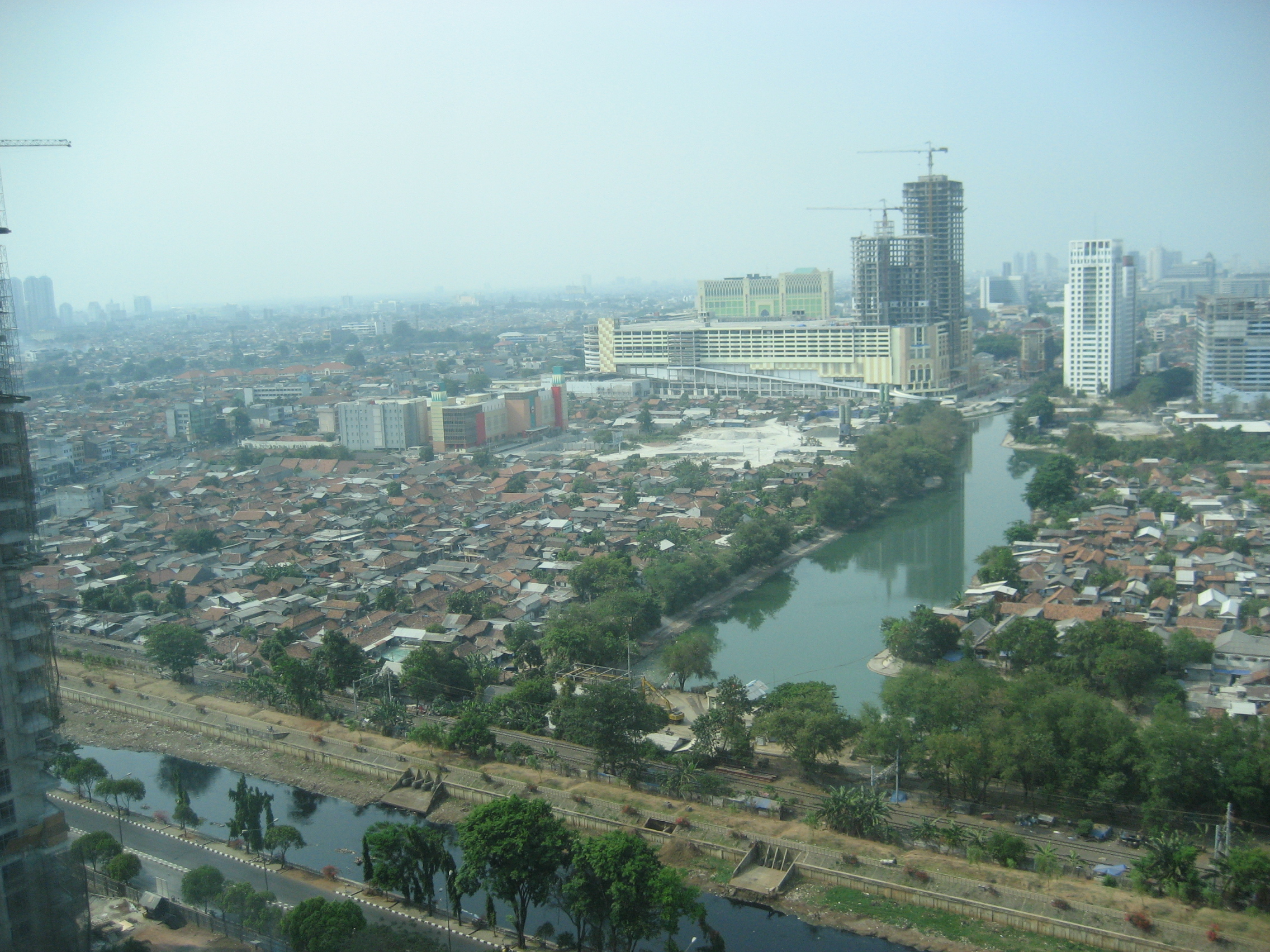
A view of Tanah Abang District centered on the Kebon Melati reservoir. The constructed high rises, in Thamrin City mall, is later host to an apartment and a hotel. The large green building in the distance is Tanah Abang market.

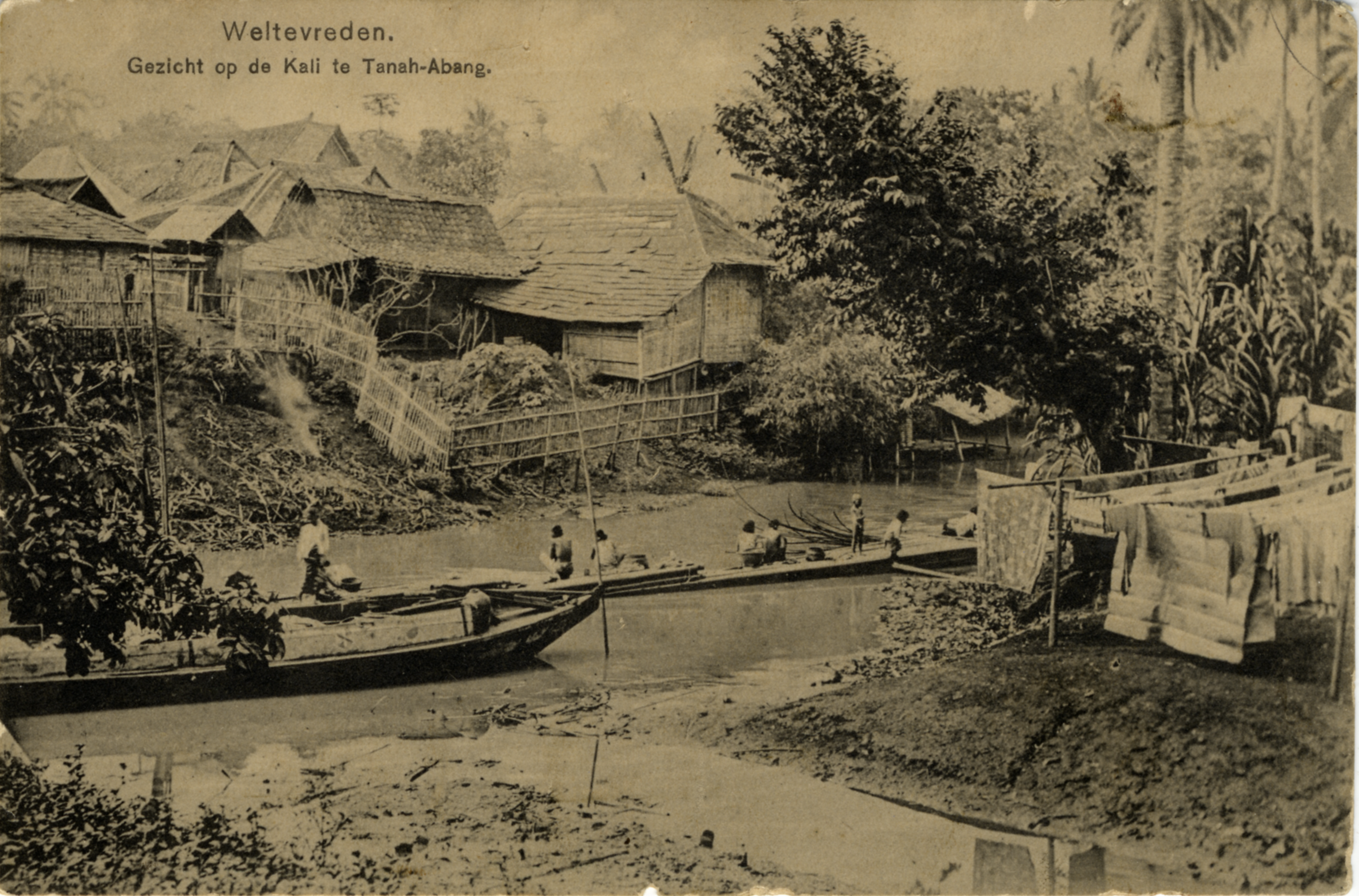
Kali Tanah Abang (circa 1910)

Tanah Abang market is in Kelurahan Kebon Kacang, next to Tanah Abang station on the western edge. The market has been known to exist since 1735. The market is the main forum for textile trade orders in Indonesia and the biggest in Southeast Asia, with much of its business conducted by sample, enabling side-by-side comparisons of competitors in quality, design, and innovation in all types of textile applications and fashion. Major manufacturers and smaller, niche ones compete for market space. Before 2003, the market was divided into three parts (Note: one prefixed Metro; others suffixed Lama and AURI). Part of the market was ravaged by fire in February 2003 but soon rebuilt. Extensions and dominant parts, Blok A and Blok B, were added in 2005 and 2010. Blok A is the largest, covering 160,000 square meters, having almost 8,000 kiosks, and is visited by about 80,000 buyers on busy days, with daily transactions averaging about Rp 500 billion ($43 million). It is well known among traders from Africa, Australasia, and much of Asia.

== Traffic congestion ==
In November 2017, Governor Anies Baswedan claimed that congestion in the Tanah Abang district was caused by pedestrians instead of street vendors conducting business on the area's sidewalks and roads. The city administration closed a 400-meter road stretch for traffic (except for Transjakarta buses) to accommodate the street vendors, against criticism from pedestrians, public transport drivers, and regular vendors. Although some observers noted that the move might violate national regulations, the street vendors and some city officials praised the move. On 7 December 2018, a sky bridge was opened above the road to accommodate the street vendors.

== Kelurahan (administrative villages) ==
The district is divided into seven kelurahan (administrative villages) and their area codes are given:

Bendungan Hilir	10210
Karet Tengsin	10220
Kebon Melati	10230
Kebon Kacang	10240
Kampung Bali	10250
Petamburan	10260
Gelora	10270

== List of important places ==
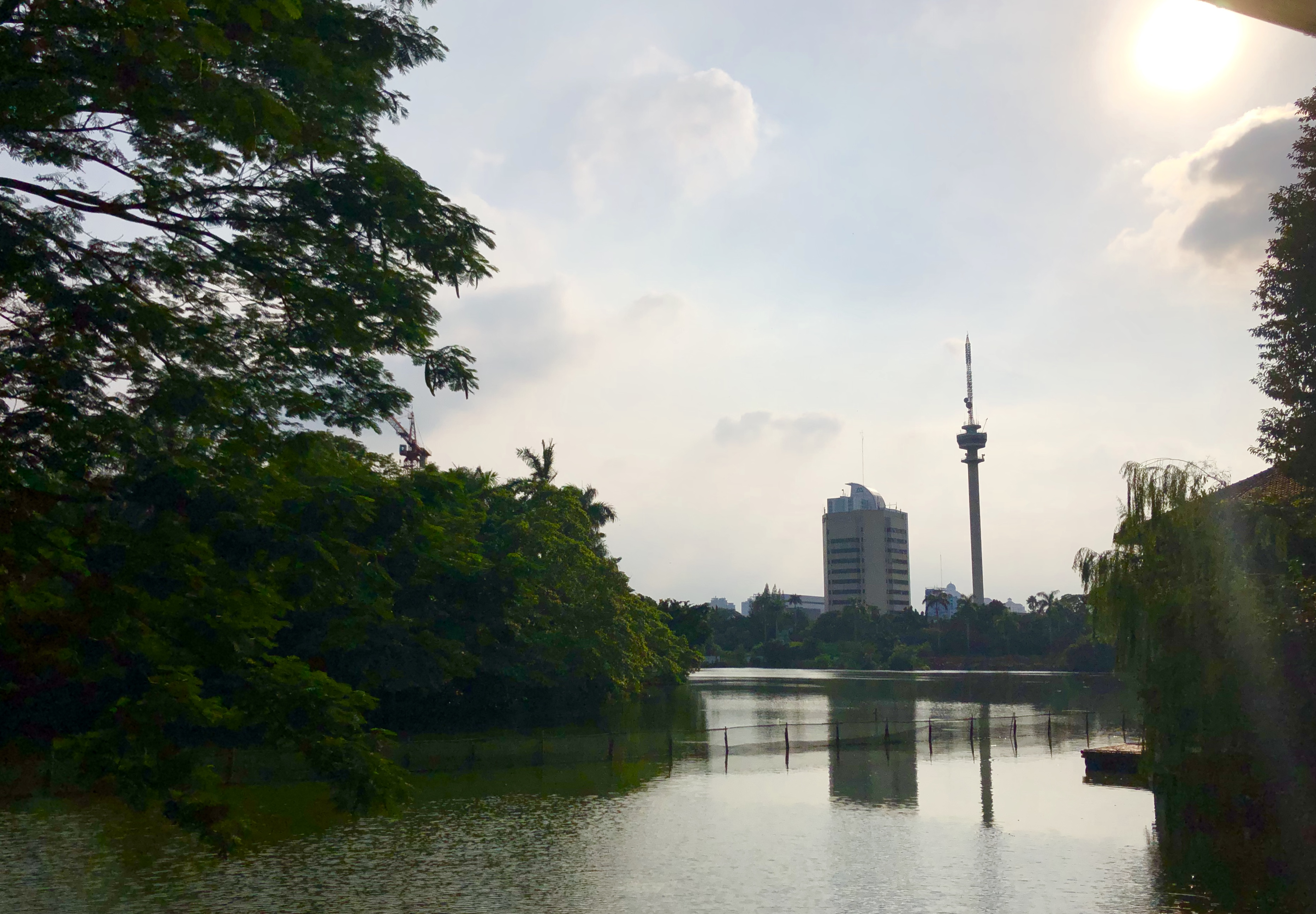
Jakarta's iconic TVRI tower and now-closed theme park Taman Ria are both located at Tanah Abang.

- Gelora Bung Karno Stadium
- Hotel Grand Indonesia (western extension)
- Jakarta International Convention Center
- Karet Bivak Cemetery
- Petamburan Cemetery
- Senayan City
- Tanah Abang market
- Grid Network
- Wisma 46
- Tanah Abang railway station
- TVRI Tower

== Notes and references ==
Footnotes

Citations
