= Then There Were Three =

Then There Were Three may refer to:

- Then There Were Three (film), a 1961 Italian war movie
- A first-season episode of Hawaiian Eye

== See also ==
- ...And Then There Were Three..., a 1978 studio album by the English rock band Genesis
