= Alex Nicol =

American actor and director (1916–2001)

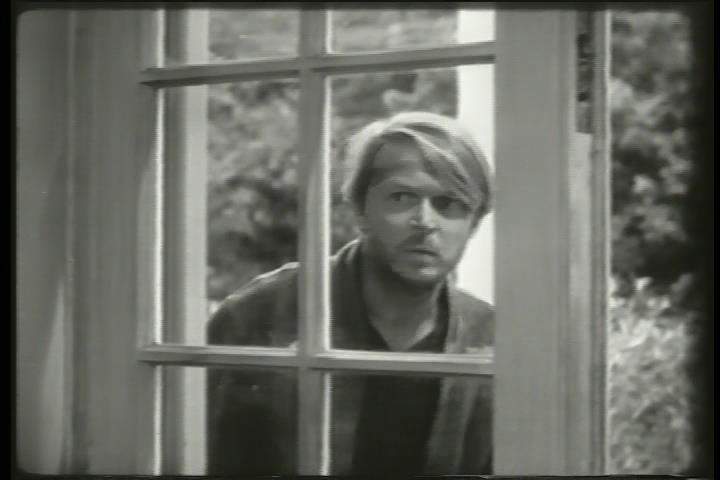
- Nicol in The Screaming Skull, 1958
- Born: Alexander Livingston Nicol, Jr. January 20, 1916; Ossining, New York, U.S.
- Died: July 29, 2001 (aged 85); Montecito, California, U.S.
- Occupations: Actor, film and television director
- Years active: 1950–1976
- Spouse: Jean Fleming (1948-his death) (3 children)

Alexander Livingston Nicol Jr. (January 20, 1916 – July 29, 2001) was an American actor and film director. Nicol appeared in many Westerns including The Man from Laramie (1955). He appeared in more than forty feature films as well as directing many television shows including The Wild Wild West (1967), Tarzan (1966), and Daniel Boone (1966). He also played many roles on Broadway.

== Biography ==
Nicol was born in Ossining, New York, in 1916. When his movie career started thirty-four years later he adjusted the year to 1919. "I was a little older than some of the other people under contract so I thought, 'Well, I'll cure that right now'," he later confessed. His father was the arms keeper at Sing Sing. He studied at the Feagin School of Dramatic Art before joining Maurice Evans' theatrical company, with whom he made his Broadway debut with a walk-on in Henry IV, Part 1 (1939). Later a member of The Actors Studio, Nicol would play Brick in Tennessee Williams's Cat on a Hot Tin Roof, under the direction of Studio co-founder Elia Kazan.

However, it was as a character actor that Nicol spent most of his career. He also directed films, and appeared frequently on television. His acting career was interrupted by a five-year stint in the army. He served with the 101st Cavalry and attained the rank of Technical Sergeant.

Upon discharge, Nicol returned to Broadway in a revival of Clifford Odets' pro-union drama Waiting for Lefty (1946). Shortly thereafter, he was admitted to The Actors Studio, where he worked with Elia Kazan; this led to a role in the Studio's 1948 production of Sundown Beach, staged by Kazan. Nicol next appeared in Forward the Heart, and then as part of the original cast of Rodgers and Hammerstein's musical South Pacific (1949), playing one of the marines, but after a few weeks in the show he successfully auditioned to replace Ralph Meeker as Mannion in Mister Roberts, and was also made understudy to the play's star Henry Fonda.

But I never made it! He never missed a performance! And Henry's wife at the time died during the run of Mr. Roberts, but he still didn't miss the performance the night she died. He didn't show up, and the stage manager finally said to me, 'Okay, Alex, get dressed'. So I had the outfit on, and then the stage manager looked at his watch and said, 'All right, two more minutes, and we go up'. And we were one minute away from curtain time, and Fonda walked in, in costume, and he just walked right out, hit his mark, and he played the performance as though nothing had happened.

While acting in Mister Roberts, Nicol was seen by the Universal Studios director George Sherman, who was in New York City to film The Sleeping City (1950). He cast Nicol as a young doctor. Nicol was given a contract by Universal, and Sherman also directed his second film, Tomahawk (1951), in which he played a cavalry officer with a hatred of Indians.

Small roles as a prisoner of war in Target Unknown (1951) and a trainee pilot in Air Cadet (1951) preceded Nicol's first major part, co-starring with Frank Sinatra and Shelley Winters in the musical drama Meet Danny Wilson (1952). In his next film he was an antagonist again, causing Loretta Young to be wrongly sent to prison in Because of You (1952). He played a troublesome sergeant in Red Ball Express (1952), directed by Budd Boetticher.

Nicol's first lead role was opposite Maureen O'Hara in The Redhead from Wyoming (1953) directed by Lee Sholem.

"Roll 'Em Sholem" they used to call him. All he would say before every scene was "Roll 'Em!" And then when you got to the end of the scene he'd say "Cut!" and then he'd look at the script clerk and say, "Did they say all the words?", and if so that was it. When the picture was over I went to the front office at Universal and asked to be released from my contract. They thought I was crazy. But I thought, "If this is my big break, then I'm not going very far."

Going freelance, Nicol was directed by Daniel Mann in About Mrs. Leslie (1953) starring Shirley Booth and Robert Ryan. Nicol returned to Universal (at a much larger salary than he had been getting as a contract player) to appear in two George Sherman films, The Lone Hand (1953) and Dawn at Socorro (1954). Nicol then made three films in England, including the lead role in Face the Music (1954), and Ken Hughes' The House Across the Lake (1954).

It was a great script, and Sidney James, a wonderful actor, was in it, along with Hillary Brooke. Eventually I got back to the United States and I was glad to come back. Those British pictures kept me working, but they were really fast.

Anthony Mann directed Nicol in his role as a navigator in Strategic Air Command (1955), and it was Mann who then gave the actor his best-remembered role as the weak psychopathic son of a patriarch rancher (Donald Crisp) who menaced Jimmy Stewart in The Man from Laramie (1955).

After a supporting role in Jacques Tourneur's Great Day in the Morning (1956) Nicol believed his Hollywood career was not progressing. In 1956 he returned to Broadway to replace Ben Gazzara in the lead role of Brick, in Cat on a Hot Tin Roof. When the Broadway run ended Nicol starred in the tour.

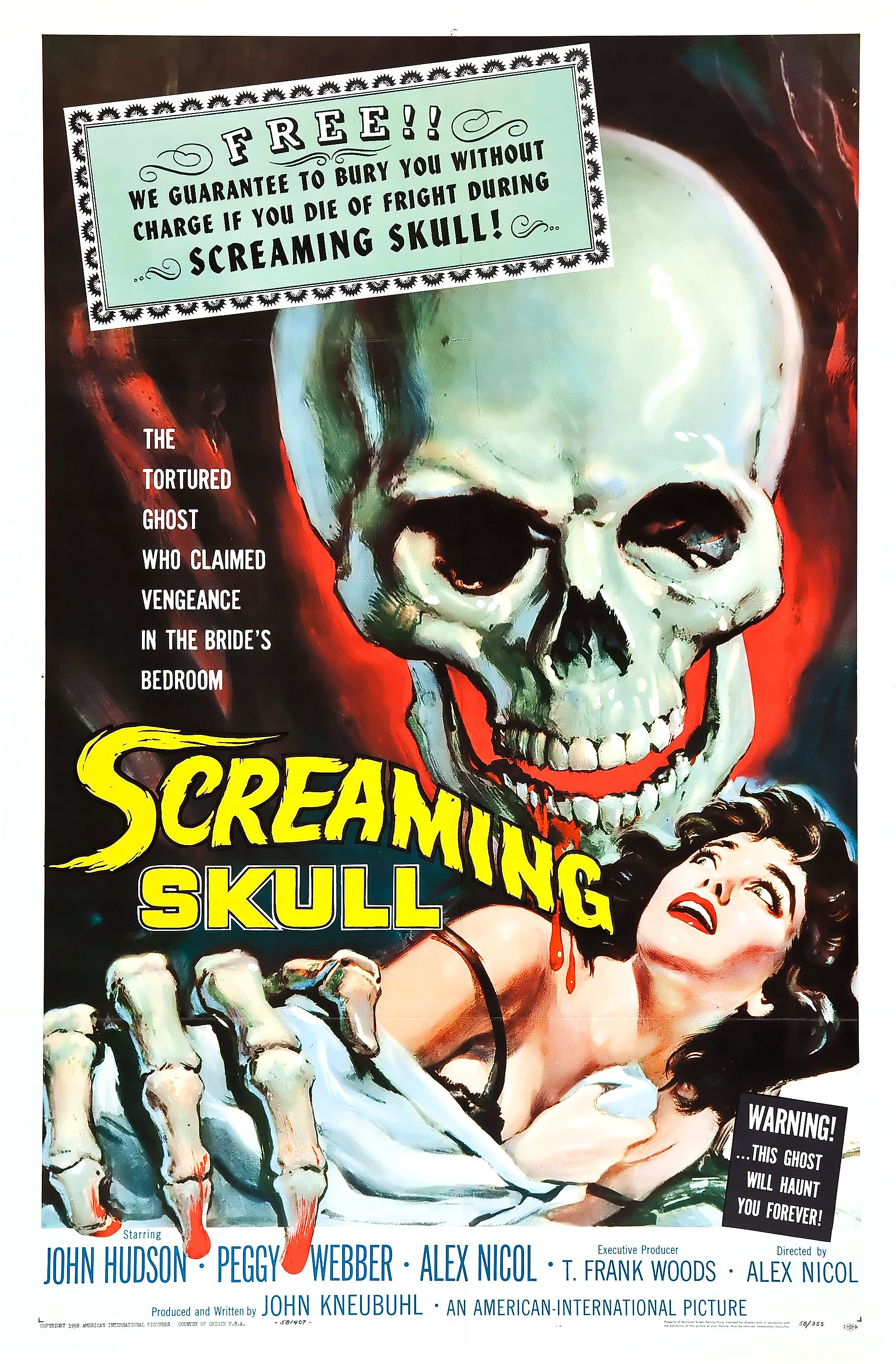
Poster for Nicol's directorial debut, The Screaming Skull

Nicol starred with Shelley Winters in the play Saturday Night Kid (1958). He then returned to Hollywood where he made his first film as a director, The Screaming Skull (1958), in which he also acted.

I wasn't doing the kind of films as an actor that I wanted to do, so I thought, "Well, I'll try directing." We shot the picture in six weeks and it did very well, so I was happy with that.

Nicol traveled to Italy when director Martin Ritt gave him a role in Five Branded Women (1959). While there he was offered parts in other movies. He and his family remained in Europe for two years.

We lived in Rome; God, it was beautiful. We did a lot of films very quickly, with backing from Italian and Yugoslavian finance sources. It was one of the happiest times of my life.

One of his last assignments in Italy was another directorial credit, Then There Were Three, also known as Three Came Back, a World War II combat and spy actioner, which he also produced and was one of the co-stars, along with Frank Latimore. Returning to the United States in 1961, he played Paul Anka's father in the thriller Look in Any Window (1961), with subsequent acting roles including The Twilight Zone episode "Young Man's Fancy" in 1962; two westerns, The Savage Guns (1962) and Gunfighters of Casa Grande (1964); Brandy (1964), Roger Corman's Bloody Mama (1969), based on the life of Ma Barker, and the independently made religious horror The Night God Screamed. Second-billed to star Jeanne Crain, he portrayed her husband, a small-time evangelist whose death at film's midpoint occurs through crucifixion by religious fanatics led by a charismatic guru styled upon Charles Manson, whose 1969 cult murders were still fresh in the public's mind during the film's production in 1971.

Nicol later worked as a director in television and did episodes of Daniel Boone, Wild Wild West, and many episodes for Tarzan starring Ron Ely. The last film in which he acted was A*P*E (1976), an independent movie made by a friend of the actor. He retired in the late 1980s and died of natural causes in Montecito, California in 2001.

Alex Nicol was survived by his wife, Jean and his three children, Lisa Nicol, Alexander Nicol III, and Eric Nicol.

== Selected filmography ==
- Alfred Hitchcock Presents (1958) (Season 3 Episode 14: "The Percentage") as Eddie Slovak
- The Twilight Zone (1962) (Season 3 Episode 34: "Young Man's Fancy") as Alex Walker
