= Young Man's Fancy (The Twilight Zone) =

- The Twilight Zone episode
- Episode no.: Season 3 Episode 34
- Directed by: John Brahm
- Written by: Richard Matheson
- Production code: 4813
- Original air date: May 11, 1962

Guest appearances
- Phyllis Thaxter: Virginia Lane Walker; Alex Nicol: Alex Walker; Wallace Rooney: Mr. Wilkinson; Helen Brown: Henrietta Walker; Rickey Kelman: Alex Walker (age 10)

Episode chronology
← Previous "The Dummy"	Next → "I Sing the Body Electric"
- The Twilight Zone (1959 TV series) (season 3)

"Young Man's Fancy" is episode 99 of the American television anthology series The Twilight Zone.

== Opening narration ==
You're looking at the house of the late Mrs. Henrietta Walker. This is Mrs. Walker herself, as she appeared twenty-five years ago. And this, except for isolated objects, is the living room of Mrs. Walker's house, as it appeared in that same year. The other rooms upstairs and down are much the same. The time, however, is not twenty-five years ago but now. The house of the late Mrs. Henrietta Walker is, you see, a house which belongs almost entirely to the past, a house which, like Mrs. Walker's clock here, has ceased to recognize the passage of time. Only one element is missing now, one remaining item in the estate of the late Mrs. Walker: her son, Alex, thirty-four years of age and, up till twenty minutes ago, the so-called perennial bachelor. With him is his bride, the former Miss Virginia Lane. They're returning from the city hall in order to get Mr. Walker's clothes packed, make final arrangements for the sale of the house, lock it up and depart on their honeymoon. Not a complicated set of tasks, it would appear, and yet the newlywed Mrs. Walker is about to discover that the old adage 'You can't go home again' has little meaning in the Twilight Zone.

== Plot ==
Virginia and Alex, who are newly wed, return to the home of Alex's late mother where he grew up. The plan is to prepare the house for selling. He finds it emotionally difficult to leave the place, let alone sell it. In the house, Virginia is bothered by constant reminders that the mother, Henrietta, is somehow present in the house and vying for Alex's loyalty. Eventually Alex becomes so engrossed in his childhood memories that Henrietta reappears. Virginia accuses Henrietta of causing this, but Henrietta says it was not her doing. Alex, who has physically become a young boy again, says to Virginia, "Go away, lady. We don't need you anymore". Horrified, Virginia flees the house, leaving the regressed Alex behind with Henrietta's ghost.

== Closing narration ==
Exit Miss Virginia Lane, formerly and most briefly Mrs. Alex Walker. She has just given up a battle and in a strange way retreated, but this has been a retreat to reality. Her opponent, Alex Walker, will now and forever hold a line that exists in the past. He has put a claim on a moment in time and is not about to relinquish it. Such things do happen in the Twilight Zone.
