= Papà Pacifico =

- Directed by: Guido Brignone
- Written by: Guido Brignone; Gaspare Cataldo; Nicola Manzari; Carlo Veo
- Starring: Antonella Lualdi; Frank Latimore
- Cinematography: Mario Albertelli
- Music by: Armando Fragna
- Release date: 1954
- Language: Italian

Papà Pacifico is a 1954 Italian comedy film directed by Guido Brignone and starring Antonella Lualdi and Frank Latimore. It grossed 88 million lire at the Italian box office.

== Cast ==
- Antonella Lualdi as Luisella Ceccacci
- Frank Latimore as Carlo Torquati
- Nando Bruno as Augusto Ceccacci
- Galeazzo Benti as Baron Alberto di Pontenero
- Bice Valori as Gina
- Carletto Sposito as The Toy Seller
- Lucia Brusco as Maria Grazia
- Agostino Salvietti as Raimondo Giorpani
- Nerio Bernardi as The Prosecutor
- Enzo Biliotti as The Judge
- Marisa Valenti as Mara Lauri
- Pino Locchi as Fofò
- Angela Lavagna as Miss Giorpani
- Franco Andrei as Pier Luigi Dodi
- Cesarina Gheraldi as The Thief
- Nino Milano as commissario
- Luisella Boni as Donatella
- Anita Durante as Ponte Nero's Doorkeeper
- Ada Colangeli as Ceccacci's Doorkeeper
- Anna Di Leo as Maria Teresa
- Ciccio Barbi as Carletto
- Michele Malaspina as The Car Vendor
