= Christian Evangelical Church in Minahasa =

Church in Indonesia

- Classification: Protestantism, Calvinism, Evangelism, Reformed Church
- Leader: Pdt. Dr. Adolf K. Wenas, M.Th
- Region: Indonesia : Minahasa, Jakarta, Bandung, Medan, Batam, Makassar and Others - Overseas : America, Japan, Australia, Hongkong etc.
- Origin: 30 September 1934; 91 years ago Tomohon, Dutch East Indies
- Separated from: Indische Kerk (Gereja Protestan di Indonesia)
- Separations: 1934
- Members: 830,107 (January 2023)
- Places of worship: 1,060
- Hospitals: 5
- Official website: gmim.or.id
- Slogan: Gereja yang Kudus, Am, dan Rasuli

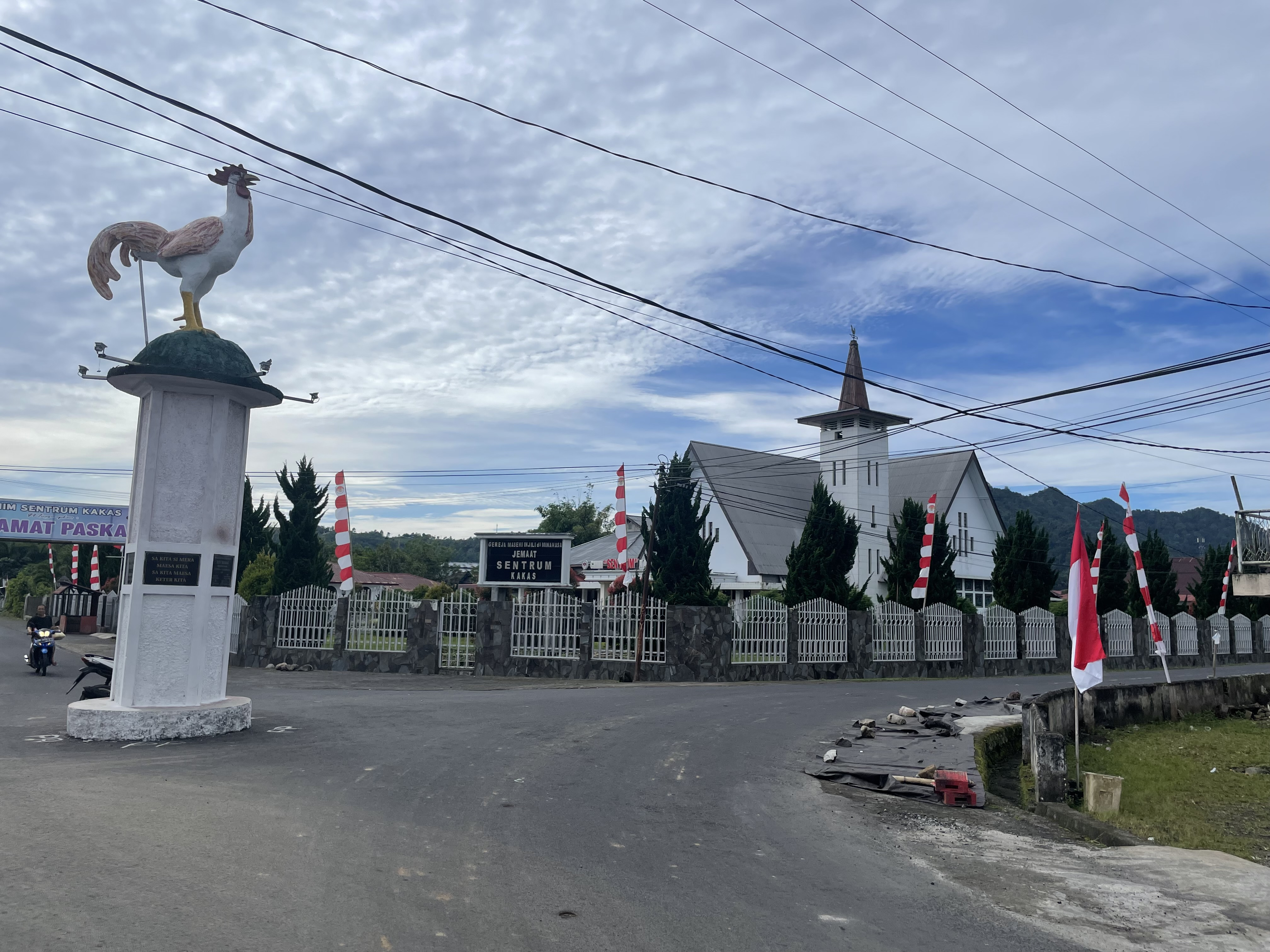
Christian Evangelical Church in Minahasa church in Kakas, North Sulawesi

The Christian Evangelical Church in Minahasa (Indonesian: Gereja Masehi Injili di Minahasa, GMIM) is a Protestant, Calvinist and Reformed denomination in Indonesia. It was founded in North Sulawesi on 30 September 1934.

Christianity was introduced to Minahasa by Johann Friedrich Riedel and Johann Gottlieb Schwarz. They were educated in the Netherlands and were sent by the Netherlands Missionary Society. By the 1880s the Christian population grew to 80,000. In 1876 it became part of the colonial state church the Protestant Church in Indonesia. The first synod was in 1934, at which it adopted its current name. Sister church relations were established with the Reformed Church in the Netherlands, Lutheran World Federation, Presbyterian Church in Korea, Reformed Church in America, and Uniting Church in Australia.

Membership of the church is 824,977 in 1,089 parishes.

The Christian Evangelical Church in Minahasa is a member of World Communion of Reformed Churches.
