= Shock (1946 film) =

1946 film by Alfred L. Werker

- Theatrical release poster
- Directed by: Alfred L. Werker
- Screenplay by: Eugene Ling; Martin Berkeley
- Story by: Albert DeMond
- Produced by: Aubrey Schenck
- Starring: Vincent Price; Lynn Bari; Frank Latimore
- Cinematography: Joseph MacDonald; Glen MacWilliams
- Edited by: Harmon Jones
- Music by: David Buttolph
- Color process: Black and white
- Production company: 20th Century Fox
- Distributed by: 20th Century Fox
- Release date: February 1, 1946
- Running time: 70 minutes
- Country: United States
- Language: English
- Budget: $350,000
- Box office: $800,000

Shock is a 1946 American psychological horror thriller film directed by Alfred L. Werker and starring Vincent Price, Lynn Bari and Frank Latimore. It was produced and distributed by 20th Century Fox.

== Plot ==
The full film

Janet Stewart arrives at a hotel expecting to find her husband Paul already checked in, but he hasn't arrived, causing her to wonder if he's had an accident. Adding to her distress, for the last two years he's been presumed dead. When the hotel clerk can't find her reservation and says they don't have any open rooms she nearly bursts into tears, but the hotel manager finds her a room. She falls asleep on the couch and has an hallucinatory dream in which Paul arrives but she's unable to open the door to him, and he cries for help. Waking, distraught, she follows the sound of an airplane to the window where she overhears a man and wife arguing in a nearby room, and can clearly see the man standing in the window. The man says he wants a divorce and is love with "Elaine". When the wife says she'll give him a divorce but will tell everyone he's been entertaining his lover in their apartment, the man grabs a candlestick and strikes her. Horrified and emotionally drained, Janet collapses into a chair.

The next morning Paul arrives and attempts to surprise Janet, but discovers her sitting on the couch, staring into space. The hotel doctor is called and says she appears to be in shock and should see a specialist. He suggests they call Dr. Cross, who happens to be staying at the hotel. As it turns out, Dr. Cross is the man Janet witnessed murdering his wife. Paul says Janet's had a "rugged time" since she just learned he was alive after he was a prisoner of war for the last two years, and his plane was late. After examining Janet, Cross notes and is troubled by the direct view she would have to his own room, and recommends that she be taken to his private sanitorium rather than a hospital.

At the sanitorium Cross hears Janet, still in half-conscious state, say what she saw. He tells Elaine Jordan, his assistant and lover, that Janet saw him killing his wife. He says he didn't mean to kill her and wishes he'd called the police, but after putting her body in a trunk and having it shipped to his lodge he isn't sure he could get off with manslaughter. Elaine pushes him to try to convince Janet that she imagined what she saw. Cross has mixed feelings but goes ahead with her plan.

One night Mr. Edwards, a disturbed inmate at the sanitorium, goes into Janet's room, and as Elaine tries to get him out she and Edwards struggle. Seeing them, Janet goes into a panic, mistaking Edwards for Dr. Cross. Elaine tells Cross that since others have heard her being delusional they can now have her declared insane and committed indefinitely, and that no one will believe anything she says.

A few days later Mrs. Cross's body is found in a mountain ravine and her death is ruled accidental. However, a Mr. O'Neill from the district attorney's office then visits Cross to say they've arrested a man for breaking into a hotel near the mountain and beating a woman during a theft, and thinking this may be the criminal's pattern they've decide to do a more detailed autopsy of Mrs. Cross, as she may have been another of his victims.

Speaking with Elaine, Cross again regrets not going to the police, but Elaine pushes back. Cross hypothetically says he could give her a standard series of insulin "shock treatment" injections, with the fourth being an overdose. Elaine wants him to do it but Cross says he can't. Elaine tries to convince him by reminding him of their initial tryst, but the scene ends with Cross saying he won't do it.

O'Neill visits Cross's home again to tell him the coroner has declared the death murder, and that the weapon was a candlestick. Cross thinks it over and decides he has no choice but to go ahead with the insulin treatment.

Paul visits Dr. Harvey, who he's been consulting for a second opinion, to tell him that after three insulin treatments Janet still insists she saw Cross kill his wife with a candlestick. He also tells him Cross was at the hotel when she first went into shock, and shows him the newspaper story that says Cross's wife was killed with a candlestick. Harvey says that shortly after an insulin treatment the patient should be telling the truth. Harvey tries to call Cross but is told he's with Janet, so he and Paul head for the sanitorium.

Cross administers the fourth, lethal dose of insulin but as Janet struggles he changes his mind and tells Elaine to get him dextrose to save her. She refuses, and as they struggle he ends up strangling her. Harvey and Paul arrive, and Harvey administers adrenalin to save Janet, who recovers quickly. Cross, resigned to his fate, is taken away by O'Neill.

== Cast ==
- Vincent Price as Dr. Richard Cross
- Lynn Bari as Elaine Jordan
- Frank Latimore as Lt. Paul Stewart
- Anabel Shaw as Janet Stewart
- Stephen Dunne as Dr. Stevens (as Michael Dunne)
- Reed Hadley as O'Neill
- Renee Carson as Mrs. Hatfield
- Charles Trowbridge as Dr. Franklin Harvey

== Production ==
The film was originally to be directed by Henry Hathaway.

== Reception ==
Above and beyond the typical characteristics of the horror film genre, reviewer Bosley Crowther of The New York Times took particular offense to the film's treatment of psychiatry. Coming in the wake of World War II, in which so many people had suffered shock and could benefit from treatment of their anxieties, Crowther asked the "critical observer to protest in no uncertain tones" the movie's "social disservice" in its fostering "apprehension against the treatment of nervous disorders", deploring the lack of consideration for those in need of treatment evidenced by producer Aubrey Schenck and distributor Twentieth Century-Fox. Philip K. Scheuer of the Los Angeles Times took no such offense, calling the film a "nominal 'B' feature", which screenplay author "Eugene Ling and Director Alfred Werker have imbued... with a grade-A suspense". Jonathan Malcolm Lampley wrote in Women in the Horror Films of Vincent Price that his role in this film "foreshadows the mad doctors and scientists Price would frequently portray in his later career".

== See also ==
- List of films in the public domain in the United States
