= The Brothers Karamazov (1947 film) =

- Directed by: Giacomo Gentilomo
- Written by: Gaspare Cataldo; Alberto Vecchietti; Guido Pala
- Based on: The Brothers Karamazov; 1880 novel by Fyodor Dostoevsky
- Produced by: Ignazio Cataldo
- Starring: Fosco Giachetti; Lamberto Picasso; Mariella Lotti; Elli Parvo
- Cinematography: Giuseppe La Torre
- Edited by: Renzo Lucidi
- Music by: Renzo Rossellini
- Production company: Comiran
- Distributed by: Fincine
- Release date: 4 December 1947
- Running time: 116 minutes
- Country: Italy
- Language: Italian

The Brothers Karamazov (Italian: I fratelli Karamazoff) is a 1947 Italian historical drama film directed by Giacomo Gentilomo and starring Fosco Giachetti, Lamberto Picasso and Mariella Lotti. It is based on the 1880 novel of the same title by Fyodor Dostoyevsky. It won two Nastro d'Argento Awards, for best screenplay and for best score. The film's sets were designed by the art director Alberto Boccianti.

== Plot summary ==
In the small Russian town of Ryevsk in 1870, young monk Alexey Karamazov visits his decadent father Fyodor to request money on behalf of his older half-brother Dmitri, an officer in the army. Although Dmitri claims that he inherited the money from his deceased mother, Fyodor denies the assertion, forcing Dmitri to sign loan notes. Maintaining that Dmitri already owes him too much, Fyodor gives Alexey half of the amount that Dmitri has requested. After Alexey delivers the money, Dmitri wrecks a tavern in a brawl, when he is accused of thievery.

Back at his apartment, Dmitri is visited by Katya, the daughter of a respected military commander who is liable for five thousand rubles recently stolen from his company headquarters. Having secretly arranged with Dimitri to loan her father money in exchange for sexual favors, Katya prepares to remain the night. Dmitri playfully proposes to Katya, but when she declares that would only further her degradation, Dmitri gives Katya the money and sends her away. Several weeks later, Katya visits Dmitri, who has been arrested for the tavern incident, in a military prison in Moscow to thank him for saving her father from scandal. Despite Dmitri’s confession that he always intended to give her the money, Katya belatedly accepts his earlier proposal and declares her devotion to him.

After she reveals that her grandmother has given her a generous dowry on which they can live, Dmitri uncertainly agrees to their betrothal. Katya then asks Dmitri to leave the army, but when she suggests that she can settle his debts with Fyodor, Dmitri refuses. Katya bails Dmitri out of prison, and the couple return to Ryevsk where they are welcomed at the train station by Alexey, his full brother, writer Ivan, and Fyodor and his son Smerdyakov.

Later, when Katya presses Ivan for details of Dmitri’s youth, Ivan finds himself attracted to her. Angered by Fyodor’s expectation that he will pay off his notes upon marrying, Dmitri leaves town for several months. During that time, Ivan visits Katya daily, while Fyodor takes up with young, enchanting tavern owner Grushenka. When Dmitri returns to demand his inheritance, Fyodor challenges his son to sue him, knowing that a court scandal would taint Katya. Fyodor then urges Dmitri to marry in order to repay his debts. Exasperated, Dmitri agrees to present his grievances against Fyodor to Father Zossima.

Later that evening, Fyodor tells Grushenka of Dmitri’s return and impulsively proposes, reminding her that he thought so much of her that he gave her Dmitri’s notes to collect for herself. Grushenka refuses the proposal, then suggests that she have one of her employees, former army captain Snegiryov, buy all of Dmitri’s debts at half value and demand repayment. As Dmitri will be unable to pay, he will be put in debtor’s prison, leaving Fyodor to legally keep Dmitri’s inheritance. Later, upon learning that Snegiryov has purchased his debts, Dmitri confronts him in the street, humiliating the frail, older man in front of his young son Illusha. Snegiryov confesses to acting on behalf of Grushenka, who is league with Fyodor. Dmitri angrily tells Katya of his father’s latest ploy and she again offers to pay off the loans. When Dmitri refuses, she asks him to mail a letter to her father that contains three thousand rubles, knowing that Dmitri will keep the money for himself.

Dmitri sets off to confront Grushenka, but is unexpectedly captivated by her radiant charm. The two ride to an out-of-town tavern where Dmitri spends Katya’s money. When Dmitri tells Grushenka that he will never marry Katya, Grushenka forgives him the debts she holds. Over the next several weeks the two embark on a passionate affair. When Dmitri meets with Fyodor and Father Zossima, Fyodor berates him for the false inheritance claim and for his flagrant romance with Grushenka. Dmitri surprises Fyodor, Ivan and Alexey by stating that he wishes to drop his claim, settle one particular debt and leave Ryevsk. Fyodor attempts to provoke Dmitri, compelling Father Zossima to declare that he is helpless in settling the matter.

After several weeks, Dmitri’s obsession with Grushenka turns into possessive jealousy and she chafes under his suspicions. Dmitri then asks Alexey to speak to Katya about breaking their engagement. When Dmitri laments that he is unable to pay back the money that he took from Katya, Alexey offers to ask Fyodor to loan Dimitri the money. A few days later during a discussion at Fyodor’s home, Smerdyakov and Ivan agree that if there is no God, all behavior is permissible. Dmitri then bursts in looking for Grushenka and when Fyodor taunts him, Dmitri attacks his father. Threatening to kill Fyodor if he tries to see Grushenka, Dmitri departs.

The next evening, Alexey goes to see Katya and is surprised to find her with Grushenka. Katya assures Alexey that Dmitri will never marry Grushenka, who has told Katya of Dmitri’s jealousy and her desire to return to her first lover, a Polish officer. Angered by Katya’s confidence, Grushenka ridicules Katya’s manipulative insincerity and class prejudice, and insists that she has not given her word to leave Dmitri. As Grushenka departs, Ivan arrives to inform Katya that he is leaving for Moscow. When Katya pleads for him to stay, Ivan derides her for using him while caring only for Dmitri.

Meanwhile, Dmitri pawns his pistols for two hundred rubles, which he asks Alexey to give to Snegiryov as an apology for his insulting behavior. Dmitri confesses to his younger brother that he has realized that only by taking responsibility for all his actions will he be able to move forward with life. While Dmitri departs to collect debts owed him by army colleagues, Alexey takes the money to Snegiryov, who is overwhelmed. Illusha, made ill by the shame of his father’s insult, pleads with him not to accept the apology, forcing Snegiryov to refuse the money. Later, Smerdyakov tells Ivan that he believes that Dmitri will murder Fyodor out of jealousy.

When Ivan expresses doubt, Smerdyakov divulges that he is planning to arrange a confrontation between Fyodor and Dmitri. After Ivan departs for Moscow, Smerdyakov puts his plot into action, arranging for a rendezvous between Grushenka and the Polish officer. When Dmitri returns and finds Grushenka gone, he hastens to Fyodor’s. Although convinced of Grushenka’s infidelity, Dmitri is unable to attack his father, even when Fyodor beats him. Drawn by the commotion, caretaker Grigory attempts to prevent Dmitri’s escape and is struck down.

Learning of Grushenka’s whereabouts from her maid Marya, Dmitri confronts her and the Polish officer, only to find that the officer has been gambling all evening. After the officer proposes to Grushenka, she realizes that he only wants her for her money. Grushenka rejects the officer, then apologizes to Dmitri and pledges herself to him. As Dmitri is about to confess the assault on Grigory, the police arrive and Dmitri is stunned to learn that while Grigory will recover, Fyodor has been murdered. At his trial, Dmitri pleads guilty to a life of debauchery and debt, but insists he did not murder Fyodor. The prosecutor reveals that three thousand rubles were stolen from Fyodor the night of his murder and Katya testifies that Dmitri had taken the same amount from her, but insists that she did not expect reimbursement.

Later in private, Ivan, who has returned for the funeral, laments to Katya that Dmitri will be found guilty, then reveals that he has a plan to smuggle Dmitri out of the country. Later, Ivan confronts Smerdyakov at home and is angered to find him wearing Fyodor’s clothes and drinking his liquor. Smerdyakov confesses to killing Fyodor, but insists that Ivan was complicit when he confirmed Smerdyakov’s belief in a godless world. When Smerdyakov shows Ivan the money that he stole from Fyodor to implicate Dmitri and reveals that he murdered Fyodor to gain respect, Ivan demands that Smerdyakov go to the police.

Dismayed, Smerdyakov accuses Ivan of hypocrisy, but Ivan departs for the police. Later that evening, Alexey and Grushenka arrive at Fyodor’s seeking Ivan and find Smerdyakov has hanged himself. The following day in court, Ivan desperately repeats Smerdyakov’s confession and implicates himself as well. After Ivan, Dmitri and Alexey reconcile, Katya submits a letter into evidence in which Dmitri claims that he will get the money owed her from Fyodor even if forced to kill him. Before being found guilty, Dmitri declares that only through punishment will he find salvation and regeneration.

The next day, Katya watches the train taking newly sentenced prisoners to prison camp and is stunned to realize that Dmitri is not among them. Ivan and Alexey have arranged to transport Dmitri and Grushenka out of Russia. Before departing, Dmitri insists on stopping at Snegiryov’s, where, in front of Illusha, Dmitri offers his sincere apology and pleads for forgiveness. Illusha accepts his apology and Snegiryov forgives Dmitri, freeing him to start a new life.

== Cast ==
- Fosco Giachetti as Dimitri Karamazov
- Mariella Lotti as Caterina Ivanovna
- Elli Parvo as Gruscenka
- Andrea Checchi as Ivan Karamazov
- Giulio Donnini as Smerdyakov
- Lamberto Picasso as Fjodor Karamazoff
- Carlo Conso as Aljoscia
- Milly Vitale as Lisa
- Paola Veneroni as Fénja
- Franco Scandurra as Pjotr Ilic Perchòtin
- Laura Carli as Kòclakoff
- Liana Del Balzo

== Bibliography ==
- Luca Barattoni. Italian Post-Neorealist Cinema. Edinburgh University Press, 2013.
