= Genoese Dragnet =

- Directed by: Guido Brignone
- Written by: Gaetano Loffredo; Guido Brignone; Gaspare Cataldo
- Produced by: Fortunato Misiano
- Cinematography: Giuseppe La Torre
- Music by: Ezio Carabella
- Release date: October 1952 (Italy)
- Country: Italy
- Language: Italian

Genoese Dragnet (Italian: Processo contro ignoti) is a 1952 Italian crime-melodrama film. The movie relates the story of Michele, a man accused of murdering a kidnapped girl and his fight to prove his innocence.

== Plot ==
Genoa. Two wealthy spouses have their little daughter kidnapped. The kidnappers ask for a ransom of twenty million: the father makes the payment but the girl is not released. The searches start and in a short time it turns out that her child died of suffocation. The outrage of public opinion initiates the investigation, but it takes many months before the arrest of the alleged culprit, a mechanic of a garage who cannot justify his sudden enrichment.

After an intense interrogation, he admits to having driven the vehicle in which the child was taken to the kidnappers' lair, while totally ignoring the purpose of the mission. For fear he did not report the leader of the gang, who gave him part of the ransom before fleeing. He is sent for trial and, during the trial that follows, the wife of the mechanic, a cashier in the bar where the head of the gang worked, has a seriously ill son and in order to get the money she agrees to become the boss's lover. However, the woman realizes that she still loves her husband and therefore decides to collaborate with her defense lawyer. The gang leader is killed as soon as he sets foot in Genoa; the owner of the bar is accused of the murder and sentenced to life in prison. The mechanic is sentenced to a light sentence; once he is out, after a few months, he will forget his wife's betrayal for the sake of his son.

== Cast ==
- Lianella Carell as Gianna
- Cesare Danova as Lawyer Enzo Pirani
- Charles Rutherford as Michele Esposito
- Arnoldo Foà as Basilio
- Marcello Giorda as Gabriele
- Carlo Lombardi as Judge Ranieri
- Tina Lattanzi as Ranieri's Wife
- Ignazio Balsamo as Giovanni Feruglio
- Domenico Modugno as Police Commissioner
- Memmo Carotenuto as Carcerato
- Carlo Sposito as Worker
