= A Woman Has Killed =

- DVD cover
- Directed by: Vittorio Cottafavi
- Written by: Siro Angeli; Giorgio Capitani; Vittorio Cottafavi
- Starring: Frank Latimore; Lianella Carell
- Cinematography: Bitto Albertini
- Edited by: Renzo Lucidi
- Music by: Renzo Rossellini
- Production company: Nuovissima Film
- Distributed by: Cinecid (Indipendenti Regionali)
- Release date: 4 January 1952
- Running time: 93 minutes
- Country: Italy
- Language: Italian

A Woman Has Killed (Italian: Una donna ha ucciso) is a 1952 Italian melodrama crime film directed by Vittorio Cottafavi. While on a train journey a young woman tells another passenger how she murdered her husband, a British army officer. It is a neorealist film, based on the real story of Lidia Cirillo, who appears in the film.

The film's sets were designed by the art director Ottavio Scotti.

== Cast ==
- Frank Latimore as Capt. Roy Prescott
- Lianella Carell as Anna
- Alessandro Serbaroli as Larry (as Alex Serbaroli)
- Vera Palumbo as Carla
- Umberto Spadaro as Padre di Anna
- Marika Rowsky
- Celeste Aída
- Diego Muni
- Vincenzo Milazzo
- Pia De Doses
- Lidia Cirillo

== Bibliography ==
- Bayman, Louis. The Operatic and the Everyday in Postwar Italian Film Melodrama. Edinburgh University Press, 2014.
