= Lianella Carell =

Italian actress (1927–2000)

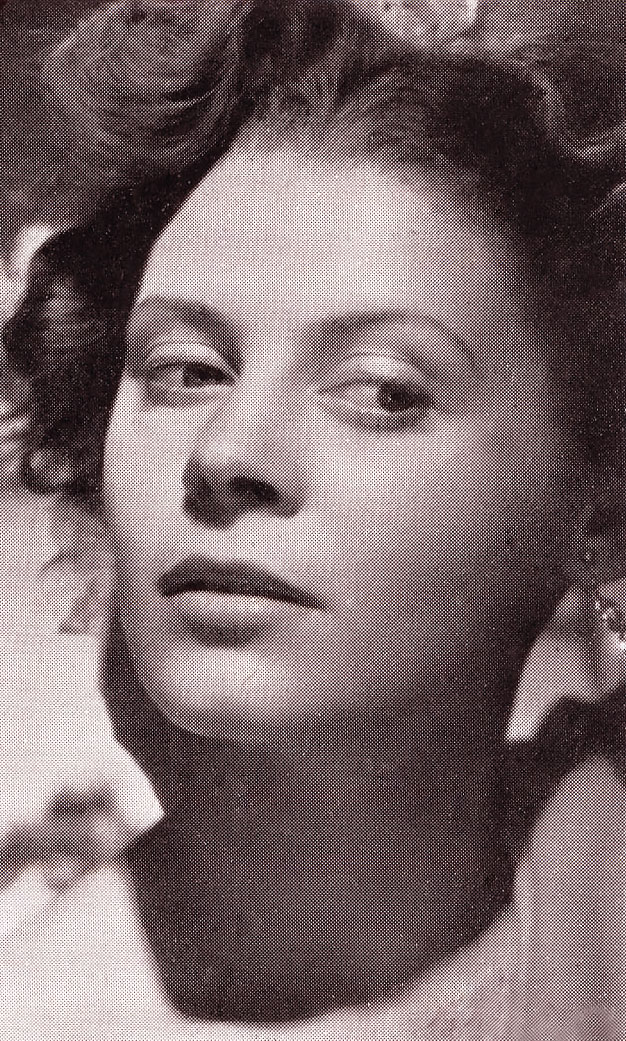
- Carell in 1951
- Born: 6 May 1927; Rome, Italy
- Died: 22 December 2000 (aged 73); Rome, Italy
- Occupations: Actress, screenwriter
- Years active: 1949-1984

Lianella Carell (6 May 1927 – 22 December 2000) was an Italian film actress and screenwriter. She appeared in 18 films between 1948 and 1958. She is best known for playing Maria Ricci, the wife of the protagonist in the 1948 film Bicycle Thieves, which was also her acting debut.

== Career ==
Originally a writer, playwright and journalist, Carell knew Vittorio De Sica during an interview she made for a radio program; at the time De Sica was looking for a non-professional cast for Bicycle Thieves, and particularly for the female lead. The role of Maria gave Carell critical acclaim, and brought her several main roles for about a decade. Dissatisfied with her career, she eventually retired from acting in 1958 to focus on a career as a screenwriter and television writer.

== Filmography ==
=== Acting credits ===
Year	Title	Role	Notes
1948	Bicycle Thieves	Maria	
1950	Welcome, Reverend!	Anna	
1951	The Forbidden Christ		
1951	The Counterfeiters	Lucia	
1952	A Woman Has Killed	Anna	
1952	Viva il cinema!	Gertrude Edelweiss	
1952	Ragazze da marito	Gina Mazzillo	
1953	Viva la rivista!		
1954	Genoese Dragnet	Gianna, moglie di Michele	
1954	Cose da pazzi	Diomora Guidi	
1954	Desiderio 'e sole	Mary	
1954	Letter from Naples	Laura Conforto	
1954	The Gold of Naples	Carolina Petrillo	(segment "Il guappo")
1954	A Free Woman	Solange	
1955	Accadde al penitenziario		
1955	Il piccolo vetraio	madre di Piero	
1958	Pezzo, capopezzo e capitano	Mrs. Sciacciabratta	
1958	Gli zitelloni	Carmen	

=== Screenplays ===
- Love and Troubles , directed by Angelo Dorigo (1958)
- Me, Me, Me... and the Others, directed by Alessandro Blasetti (1965)
- Bandits in Rome, directed by Alberto De Martino (1968)
- Carnal Circuit, directed by Alberto De Martino (1969)
- Scandal in the Family, directed by Bruno Gaburro (1974)
