= Pieter Erberveld =

Eurasian resident of Batavia accused of rebellion

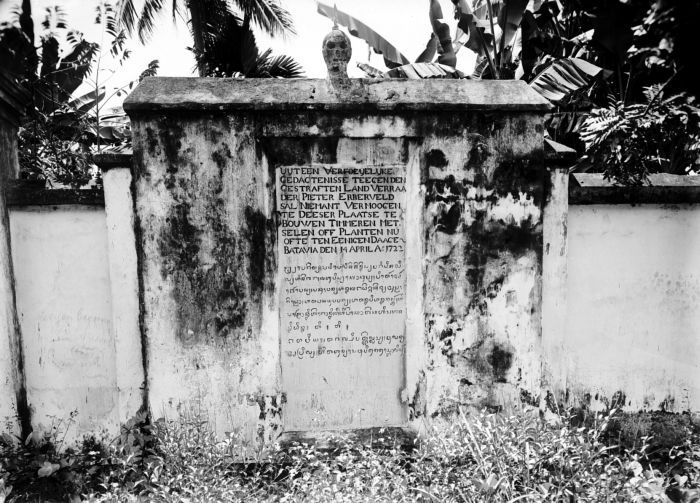
Pieter Erberveld memorial monument (Oud-Jacatraweg, Batavia).

Pieter Erberveld (ca. 1660 – April 14, 1722) was a Eurasian resident of Batavia, Dutch East Indies (now Jakarta), the headquarters of the VOC in Asia, during the 17th and early 18th centuries who was accused of plotting a rebellion with Javanese for January 1, 1722, but was captured and executed, and a monument erected where his house had once stood.

Although he is often described as half-Javanese, or half-Dutch, Pieter Erberveld was the son of a German (Westphalian) father, a tanner of hides, and Siamese Christian mother. He was born around 1660 in the Siamese kingdom of the Ayutthayan kingdom. When his father moved the family to Batavia, he had them all baptized in November 1671. Erberveld was among the more wealthy residents of Batavia, although he was not a VOC employee. In the early 18th century, he had a dispute with the VOC authorities about his inheritance, which may have played a role in later events. In 1721, he was accused of plotting a rebellion with thousands of Javanese, with the goal of establishing an Islamic state, but was arrested at his residence with a small number of people, tortured, and quartered.

The monument which was erected on the site of his residence featured a concrete or plaster skull on a spike (which was rumored to be real), and carried a plaque stating that no one should ever build or plant on this site again. This monument remained in its original location on the Jacatraweg until the Japanese demolished it in early 1942, as one of their efforts to rid Indonesia of the Dutch and the colonial atmosphere, but even Japanese visitors had been regularly taken to visit the monument in prewar years. After the war, the monument was rebuilt, before being moved again to the Taman Prasasti Museum in Tanah Abang.

Pieter Erberveld was locally relatively well known, and is sometimes referred to as Pangeran Pecah Kulit (broken skin prince) either because of the means of his death (drawing and quartering) or more likely from the local area's nickname, derived from the presence of a tannery in the area. Numerous stories about Erberveld have circulated in Indonesian society since at least 1888, including a novel published in 1924 by Tio Ie Soei and one version of the story about his was made into a TV drama in the 1980s.

The spelling of Pieter Erberveld varies in different sources, including Pieter Erbervelt and Pieter Elberveld.
