= Gaspare Cataldo =

Italian screenwriter

- Born: 25 January 1902; Alcamo, Sicily, Italy
- Died: 13 March 1970 (aged 68); Rome, Lazio, Italy
- Occupation: Screenwriter
- Years active: 1940-1961 (film)

Gaspare Cataldo (1902–1970) was an Italian screenwriter. In 1947 he awarded the Nastro d'Argento for Best Screenplay for his work on The Brothers Karamazov.

== Selected filmography ==
- A Romantic Adventure (1940)
- One Hundred Thousand Dollars (1940)
- Honeymoon (1941)
- Love Story (1942)
- Two Suffer Better Than One (1943)
- The Lovers (1946)
- Before Him All Rome Trembled (1946)
- The Brothers Karamazov (1947)
- Crime News (1947)
- Heart and Soul (1948)
- Twenty Years (1949)
- The Accusation (1950)
- Revenge of a Crazy Girl (1951)
- The Ungrateful Heart (1951)
- Four Red Roses (1951)
- We're Dancing on the Rainbow (1952)
- Genoese Dragnet (1952)
- Ivan, Son of the White Devil (1953)
- Papà Pacifico (1954)
- Wives and Obscurities (1956)
- Akiko (1961)

== Bibliography ==
- Tad Bentley Hammer. International film prizes: an encyclopedia. Garland, 1991.
