= The Enemy (1952 film) =

1952 film

- Directed by: Giorgio Bianchi
- Written by: Dario Niccodemi (play); Fede Arnaud; Giorgio Bianchi; Ermanno Donati; Sergio Donati; Alberto Vecchietti
- Produced by: Luigi Carpentieri; Ermanno Donati
- Starring: Elisa Cegani; Frank Latimore; Vira Silenti.
- Cinematography: Carlo Montuori
- Edited by: Mario Serandrei
- Music by: Carlo Rustichelli
- Production company: Athena Cinematografica
- Distributed by: Rank Film
- Release date: 26 November 1952
- Running time: 87 minutes
- Country: Italy
- Language: Italian

The Enemy (Italian: La Nemica) is a 1952 Italian melodrama film directed by Giorgio Bianchi and starring Elisa Cegani, Frank Latimore and Vira Silenti. It was shot at the Cinecittà Studios in Rome. The film's sets were designed by the art director Mario Chiari.

== Plot ==
A wealthy duchess seemingly despises one of her two sons — the one whom everyone else in the family adores. The sudden unveiling of a dark family secret drives the narrative, revealing the true reasons behind her unexpected hostility and emotional distance.

== Cast ==
- Elisa Cegani as Duchessa Anna
- Frank Latimore as Roberto
- Vira Silenti as Fiorenza
- Jacques Verlier as Gastone
- Carlo Ninchi as Monsignore
- Ada Dondini as Nonna
- Filippo Scelzo as Notario Ragaldi
- Cosetta Greco as Marta
- Sandro Franchina as Roberto bambino
- Luigi Cimara as Lord John Lumb

== Bibliography ==
- Bayman, Louis. The Operatic and the Everyday in Postwar Italian Film Melodrama. Edinburgh University Press, 2014.
