= Barry Cahill (actor) =

American actor (1921–2012)

- Born: May 28, 1921; Vancouver, British Columbia, Canada
- Died: April 9, 2012 (aged 90); Ventura, California, US
- Occupation: actor
- Known for: Sam Powers
- Spouse: Rachel Ames (m. 1968)
- Children: 2

Barry Cahill (May 28, 1921 – April 9, 2012) was a Canadian-born American film, theater and television actor, whose professional career spanned more than fifty years. His film credits included Grand Theft Auto, and Sweet Bird of Youth. His television roles included The Travels of Jaimie McPheeters, The Young and the Restless, Dynasty, and Santa Barbara.

== Early life ==
Cahill was born in Vancouver, British Columbia, on May 28, 1921, to Stephen and Theresa Cahill.

== Career ==
He portrayed Sam Powers on The Young and the Restless soap opera during the mid-1970s. On television he appeared regularly during the 1960s through early 1980s, on such network shows as Rescue 8 (in 3 episodes), Perry Mason (2), Have Gun – Will Travel (6), Bonanza (2), Ben Casey (2), 12 O'Clock High (4), The Virginian (5), Mission: Impossible (3), Gunsmoke (4), The Rookies (2), Ironside (9), Kolchak: The Night Stalker (2), The Streets of San Francisco (2), M*A*S*H, The Six Million Dollar Man (4), Emergency! (3), The Waltons (3), Lou Grant (2) and Quincy M.E. (4).

== Personal life and death ==
Cahill died on April 9, 2012, at the age of 90. For 43 years he was married to actress Rachel Ames. He had a daughter, Christine; step-daughter Susan; and two grandchildren, Jocelyn and Marc.

== Filmography ==
- Imitation General (1958) - Jeep Driver (uncredited)
- Battle of the Coral Sea (1959) - Bomber Pilot (uncredited)
- Then There Were Three (1961) - Sgt. Travers
- 13 West Street (1962) - Policeman (uncredited)
- Sweet Bird of Youth (1962) - Bud
- Blindfold (1965) - CIA Agent on Phone (uncredited)
- Torn Curtain (1966) - American Correspondent (uncredited)
- Valley of the Dolls (1967) - Rough Character in San Francisco Bar (uncredited)
- Hang 'Em High (1968) - Search Party
- Daddy's Gone A-Hunting (1969) - FBI Agent Crosley
- The Happy Ending (1969) - Handsome Man
- ...tick...tick...tick... (1970) - Bob Braddock
- The Christine Jorgensen Story (1970) - Reporter
- Doctors' Wives (1971) - Attendant (uncredited)
- The Groundstar Conspiracy (1972) - Reporter
- Coffy (1973) - McHenry
- The Stone Killer (1973) - Steinholtz
- Westworld (1973) - 3rd Male Interviewee (uncredited)
- Teenager (1974)
- Half a House (1975) - Her husband
- Grand Theft Auto (1977) - Bigby Powers
- Straight Time (1978) - Salesman #2
- When You Comin' Back, Red Ryder? (1979) - Customs Doctor
- Wrong Is Right (1982) - Husband

== Selected Television ==
Year	Title	Role	Notes
1957	Have Gun - Will Travel	Abe Talltree	Episode "The Outlaw"
1957	Have Gun - Will Travel	Guard	Episode "The Bride"
1957	Have Gun - Will Travel	Sergeant Combs	Episode "The Yuma Treasure"
1958	Have Gun - Will Travel	Tom	Episode "A Sense of Justice"
1959	Wanted: Dead or Alive	Deputy	Episode "Twelve Hours to Crazy Horse"
1960	Have Gun - Will Travel	Aaron Bell	Season 3, Episode 21 "The Night the Town Died"
1961	Death Valley Days	Sergeant	Episode "The Red Petticoat"
1961	Have Gun - Will Travel	Deputy Ed Perrell	Episode "The Hanging of Aaron Gibbs"
1962	Gunsmoke	Chuck / Warden	Episodes “Jenny" / “Collie’s Free”
1963	The Alfred Hitchcock Hour	Chief Petty Officer	Season 1 Episode 31: "Run for Doom"
1966	The Legend of Jesse James	Henry Shepard	Season 1 Episode 31: "Dark Side of the Moon"
1966	12 O'Clock High	Captain Curt Douglas	5 Episodes
1967	The Man from U.N.C.L.E.	Clemson	Season 4 Episode 13: "The Maze Affair"
1967	The Girl from U.N.C.L.E.	Daniel McCall	Season 1, Episode 28: "The High and Deadly Affair"
1967-74	Ironside	Sgt. Miller	9 episodes
1968	The Invaders	Dorsey	Season 2 Episode 24: "The Life Seekers"
1968	Here Come the Brides	McGee	2 episodes
1969	The Bold Ones: The New Doctors	Dr. Strickland	Season 1 Episode 7: "And Those Unborn"
1970	The Mod Squad	Marks	Season 3 Episode 2: "See the Eagles Dying"
1971	The F.B.I.	Potter	Season 6 Episode 23: "The Hitchhiker"
1971-73	Room 222	Sgt. Grover	2 episodes
1971	The Bold Ones: The Lawyers	Schenker	Season 3 Episode 5: "By Reason of Insanity"
1972	Alias Smith and Jones	Marshal Guthrie	Season 3 Episode 11: "Witness to a Lynching"
1973	The Magician	Browning	Season 1 Episode 6: "Man on Fire"
1974	Harry O	Ben Samuels	Season 1 Episode 4: "Mortal Sin"
1974	Sons and Daughters	Gus	Season 1 Episode 2: "The Reputation"
1974	The Rockford Files	Sergeant	Season 1 Episode 13: "Profit and Loss, Part 2: Loss"
1975	The Blue Knight	Warren	Season 1 Episode 2: "Triple Threat"
1976-79	The Waltons	Buck Vernon	3 episodes
1978	Centennial	Major O'Neil	NBC Miniseries
1981	Dynasty	Bradley Milburn	Season 1 - Episode 2: "Oil: Part 3"
1984	Tales of the Unexpected	Joe	Season 7 Episode 11: "I like it here in Wilmington"
1986	Hill Street Blues	Hofler	Season 6 Episode 20: "Look Homeward, Ninja"
