= Rukmini Sukarno =

Daughter of Indonesian president Sukarno

- Born: Rukmini Sukmawati; 26 August 1942; Pangkalpinang, Japanese-occupied East Indies
- Died: May 1, 2009 (aged 66)
- Other name: Nyuk Lan
- Citizenship: Indonesia; Italy
- Occupation: Opera singer
- Spouse: Frank Latimore Kline (m. 1967; died 1998)
- Children: 1
- Father: Sukarno

Rukmini Sukarno Kline (née Sukarno; 26 August 1942 – 1 May 2009), also known as Rukmini Sukmawati, was an Indonesian-born Italian opera singer who claims to be the daughter of Indonesian president and revolutionary, Sukarno.

== Life and career ==
According to Rukmini, she was born on 26 August 1942 in Pangkalpinang, Bangka Belitung, to President Sukarno and Nina Sukarno, a Bengkulu-born woman of German descent. She was of mixed Javanese, Balinese and German descent. Her mother gave her to an ethnic Chinese family and she was later given the name Nyuk Lan.

Rukmini was sent to Rome at age 8. An opera singer, she lived in Rome in the 1960s. In 1967, she met and married the American film actor Franklin Latimore Kline. They had a son, Chris Kline (born 1964), a journalist. Her husband once arranged a concert for her at Carnegie Hall, and dubbed it Fiesta Mundo. Rukmini, who claimed to speak eight languages fluently, sang songs from the various countries around the globe.

By the late 1970s, she was the sole owner of Frankenburg Import-Export Ltd., a Kansas corporation registered in Mexico as a middleman-supplier of steel products to that country. In December 1978, Petroleos Mexicanos, "Pemex", Mexico's national oil company, accepted her bid to supply some 93,000 meters of steel oil field pipe, and in March 1979 forwarded Frankenburg-Kansas a purchase order requesting various types and quantities of pipe for which Pemex was willing to pay approximately $5.2 million.

In March 1986, she was convicted by a state court in Houston, Texas, of failing her fiduciary duties in brokering a deal between Pemex, Mexico's national oil company, and the Nissho-Iwai American Corporation. She was sentenced to 14 years in prison and fined $10,000 for misappropriating $5.5 million. She was not in court to hear the outcome of the trial. A few days later, she surrendered to the authorities, turning herself in before a state district judge in Houston, Texas and saying she fled after the conviction because she panicked and became ill.

She is listed as a contributor to the presidential campaign of George H. W. Bush in 1987. In July 1988, her appeal against the result of her suit against the Nissho-Iwai American Corporation was denied by the United States Court of Appeals for the Fifth Circuit.
