= Taman Prasasti Museum =

Open air museum of history in Jakarta, Indonesia

Coordinates: 6.172°S 106.819°E

Taman Prasasti Museum Museum Taman Prasasti
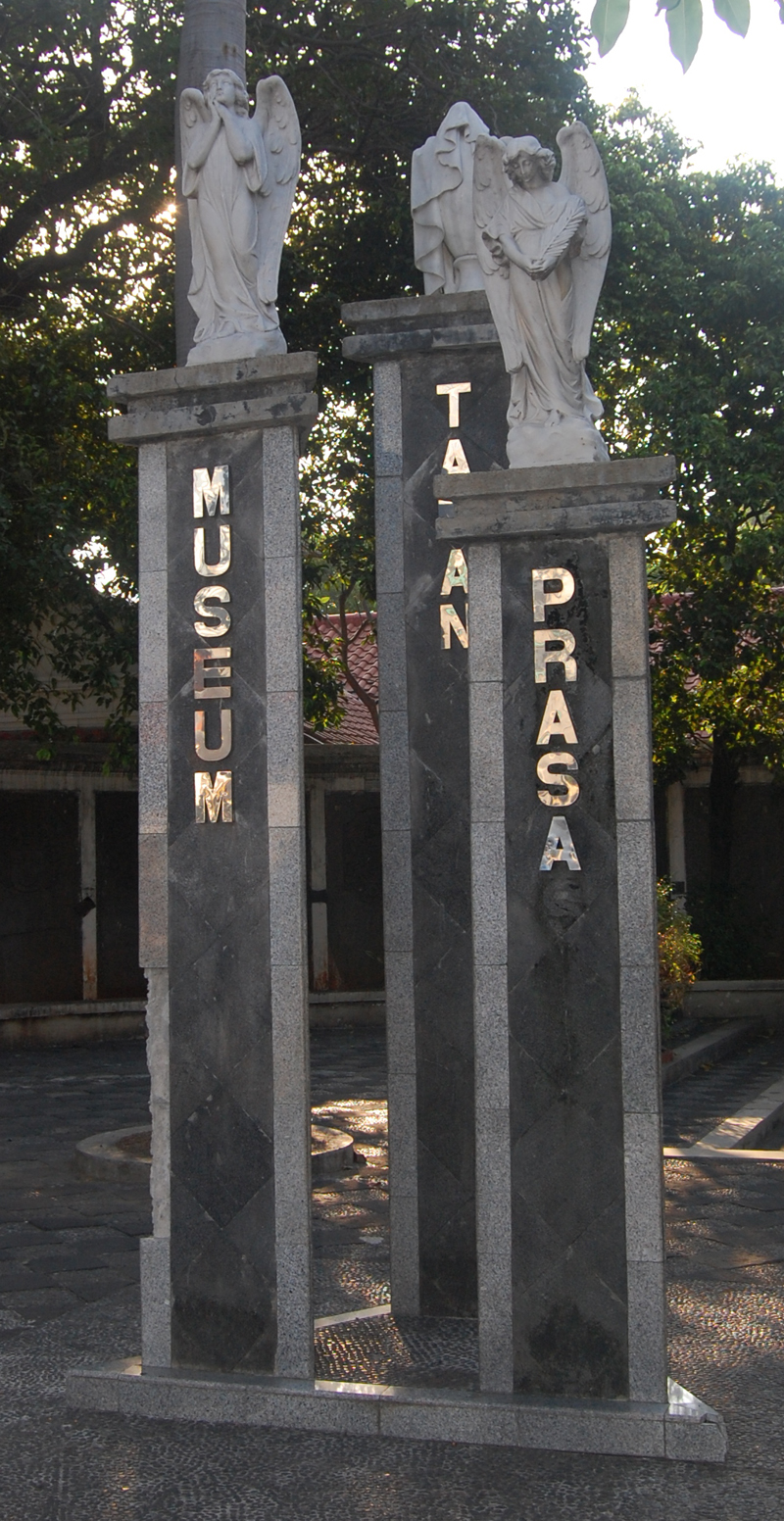
- Front view of the museum.
- Established: July 9, 1977
- Location: Jl. Tanah Abang 1, no. 1, Jakarta 10130, Indonesia
- Type: Open-air museum

Museum Taman Prasasti (Indonesian for Museum of Memorial Stone Park or Inscription Museum) is a museum located in Jakarta, Indonesia. The museum was formerly a cemetery, built by the Dutch colonial government in 1795 as a final resting place for noble Dutchmen. Several important person that was buried in the cemetery area are Olivia Mariamne Raffles – the first wife of British governor general Thomas Stamford Raffles - and Indonesian youth activist Soe Hok Gie.

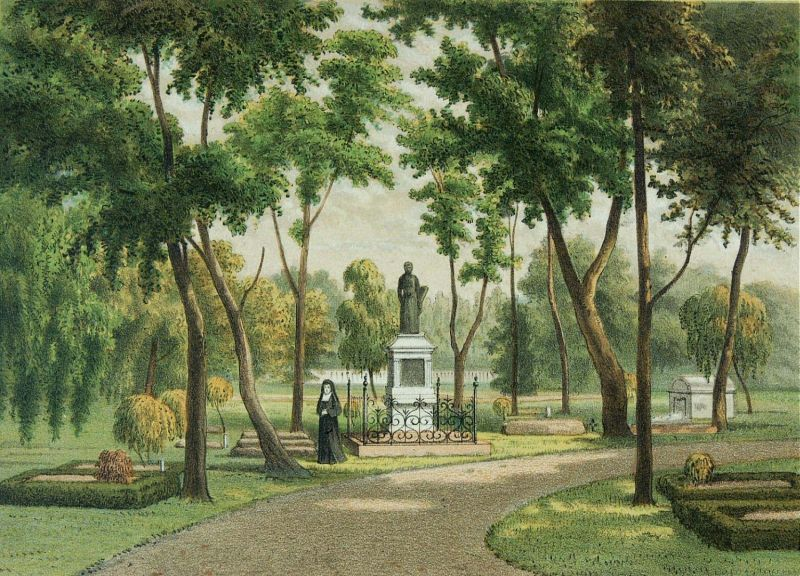
Colour lithograph from an original watercolor by Rappard. The European cemetery Kerkhof Laan in Tanah Abang with the monument of the priest Van der Grinten in 1881–1889

The cemetery area is the oldest of its kind in Jakarta and may have been the oldest modern cemetery in the world by comparison with the Fort Canning Park (1926) in Singapore, Gore Hill Cemetery (1868) in Sydney, Père Lachaise Cemetery (1803) in Paris, and Mount Auburn Cemetery (1831) in Cambridge, Massachusetts.

== History ==
The cemetery was officially opened on September 28, 1797, although people had been buried here as early as 1795. The cemetery was known as Kebon Jahe Kober (recorded under this name since December 14, 1798). It was located in Kerkhoflaan and has a total area of 5.9 ha. The cemetery was built to accommodate the increasing number of death that was caused by an outbreak of disease in Batavia. Because of this outbreak, the cemetery area of the New Dutch Church (Dutch Nieuwe Hollandsche Kerk, now the Wayang Museum), Binnenkerk (an inner city Portuguese Church), and Sion Church (an outer city Portuguese Church) was full. Because of this, some of the gravestones from these cemeteries were transferred into Keboh Jahe Kober cemetery.

Kebon Jahe Kober cemetery is located close to the river Kali Krukut. This river was once used as a transportation mode for carrying the dead to the cemetery via boat.

After Indonesia's declaration of independence, the park was used as a Christian cemetery. Within the first two years it was managed by the Verberg Foundation and for the next twenty years it was handled by the Palang Hitam Foundation.

From 1967 to 1975 the cemetery was managed by the Jakarta burials agency. In 1975, the cemetery was closed to make way for the construction of the Central Jakarta mayoralty office. At a request from the local government, some corpses were removed by relatives while others were taken to Tanah Kusir cemetery in South Jakarta. Many tombstones, sculptures and statues were removed and damaged during the construction of the office and now only 32 tombstones remain in their original positions. The size of the cemetery is also reduced from the original 5.9 hectare plot to 1.3 hectares. Only 1,372 of about 4,200 stones were selected to be kept in the cemetery.

The cemetery was officially inaugurated as Taman Prasasti Museum on July 9, 1977 by Ali Sadikin, former governor of Jakarta.

Since 2003, the museum is administered by the Jakarta History Museum management.

== Collection ==
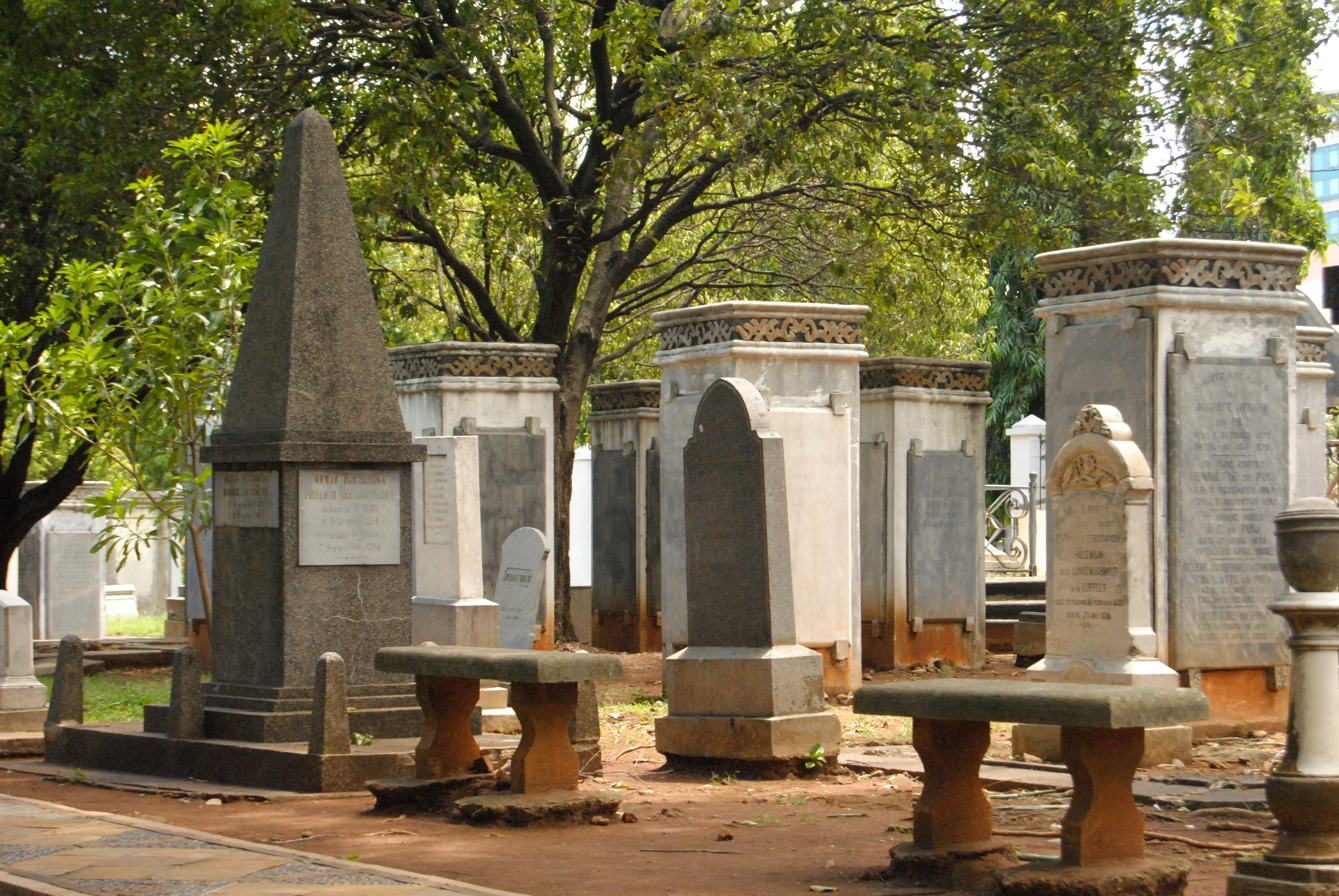
The tombstones of Taman Prasasti Museum.

The main collection of the museum is the Dutch gravestones, some of these came from the former Nieuwe Hollandsche Kerk (the location of which is now the Wayang Museum in Jakarta Old Town). These gravestones are marked with the inscription "HK" or "Hollandsche Kerk". The oldest gravestones is from the 17th century up to the end of 18th century. The style of the gravestones range from Javanese-Hindu style, neogothic, and classical. The gravestones are arranged on a park-like setting.

Other collection of this museum are ancient inscription stones, miniature of different gravestones from various provinces of Indonesia, a replica of a 17th-century hearse, and the original coffins for Sukarno and Mohammad Hatta, the first president and vice president of Indonesia.

The doric-style main building in front of the cemetery is built in 1874. The building contains two wings to the left and to the right of the main building, each is used to entomb remains of males and females.

== Notable interments ==
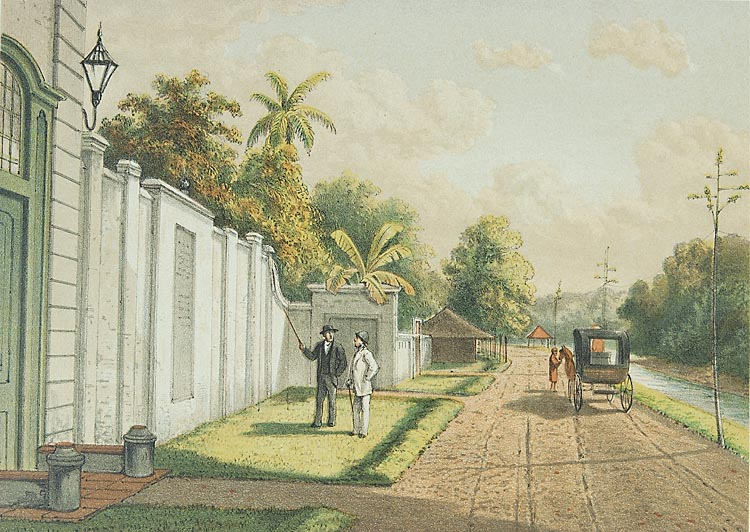
A tombstone of Pieter Eberveld, now in Taman Prasasti Museum.

- Monsignor Adam Carel Claessens, Catholic Apostolic Vicariate of Batavia.
- Adriaan Osstwalt (1674–1734), director general of the Dutch East Indies.
- Andreas Victor Michiels
- Hermanus Frederik Roll (founder of STOVIA medical school, now University of Indonesia)
- Johan Harmen Rudolf Köhler
- Jan Laurens Andries Brandes (1857–1905), Dutch archeologist who collected Hindu statues now in possession of the National Museum of Indonesia.
- Miss Riboet, a 1930s artist.
- Olivia Mariamne Raffles (died November 23, 1814), the first wife of British governor general Thomas Stamford Raffles
- Pieter Erberveld
- Soe Hok Gie, an Indonesian activist.
- Monsignor Walterus Jacobus Staal. S.J, Catholic Bishop
- Willem Frederik Stutterheim, an archeologist who wrote a book about the Hindu hero Rama.

== Literature ==
- Lenzi, Iola (2004). Museums of Southeast Asia. Singapore: Archipelago Press. p. 200. ISBN 981-4068-96-9.
