= Rima Melati Adams =

Singaporean model

Rima Melati Sheila Adams
- Born: 1 July 1980 (age 46); Wan Chai, British Hong Kong
- Other name: Rima Adams
- Occupations: Model; actress; singer; TV personality; handbag designer
- Years active: 1996–present
- Known for: Miss Singapore Universe 2001 finalist, TV hosting, handbag design
- Spouses: Davin James Cook (divorced); * Marcell Siahaan (m. ?)
- Children: 2 (Edga Ian Cook, Seth Ananda Siahaan)
- Parent(s): Ronald Adams (father), Satifah Ali (mother)
- Relatives: Haeriyanto Hassan (brother) Kuswadinata (uncle)

Rima Melati Sheila Adams (born 1 July 1980), is a Singaporean model, actress, singer and TV personality. Most recently, she is a handbag designer. She was born in Hong Kong.

== Early and personal life ==
Rima Adams was born to an Australian father, Ronald Adams, and a Singaporean-Malay mother, Satifah Ali. She is of German descent on her paternal side and Cirebonese and Tegalese Indonesian ancestry on her maternal side.

Adams was a finalist in Miss Singapore Universe 2001 and won the Best Catwalk award at the Supermodel of the World Singapore competition in 1998.

Adams was first married to Davin James Cook, with whom she has a son, Edga Ian Cook.

Her second marriage is to Marcell Siahaan and from this she has a son named Seth Ananda Siahaan. This marriage was criticised by the Malay-Muslim community in Singapore and Malaysia as it did not abide by the Shari’aah law because of the couple’s non-conforming decision to have a civil wedding. Shortly after their wedding, she left the Singapore entertainment industry and moved to Jakarta to be with Marcell and did not work for one year.

Rima is the youngest sister of Malaysian actor Haeriyanto Hassan and the niece of the late Malaysian veteran actor, Kuswadinata.

== Career ==
=== Modeling and acting ===
Starting at the age of 16, Adams modeled for Diva Models from 1996 to 2002. She then joined Supermodel of the World in Singapore in 1998 and won the ‘Best Catwalk’ award. She began her acting career at MediaCorp Suria in Singapore. In 2003, Adams starred in a highly rated Suria series “E.C.” . She subsequently starred in several telemovies in Malaysia.

=== Cooking programs ===
In Jakarta Adams became host a cooking program on Global TV, “Kitchen Beib”. By her second year in Indonesia, Rima landed her own cooking series on Trans TV, “Menjamu Tamu”.

=== Handbag line ===
Desiring to leave the entertainment field and better position herself for the lifestyle she desired for motherhood, Adams launched a line of limited quantity, handmade bags, RIMAADAMSONLINE, which are made in Indonesia.

== Television advertisements ==
- 1998-Singtel (Singapore)
- 1998-Nokia (Singapore)
- 1999-Swensens (Singapore)
- 1999-Persil (Dubai)
- 2005-Classic Ideas (Singapore)

== Television Work & Series ==
- 1996 - Host-Hari Raya Program (Singapore)
- 1998 - Singing-Pesta Perdana (Singapore)
- 2000 - MTV ASIA-Interview (Singapore)
- 2002 - Rahsia Perkhawinan-Episodic, Supporting (Singapore)
- 2003 - E.C.-Episodic, Leading (Singapore)
- 2004 - Orang Minyak Kembali-Episodic, Supporting (Singapore & Malaysia)
- 2004 - Janji Kekasih-Episodic, Supporting (Malaysia)
- 2004 - Gaduh Gaduh Sayang-Episodic, Leading (Singapore & Malaysia)
- 2005 - Cinta Q-Episodic, Leading (Singapore)
- 2005 - Host Pesta Perdana (Singapore)
- 2006 - Singing Hari Raya-Gemilang (Singapore)
- 2006 - Singing Suria Raya Karnival (Singapore)
- 2006 - Host for Dewi Programme (Singapore)
- 2007 - Nona TV (Interview appearance-Malaysia)
- 2008 - Kpak Bing Bing (Interview - Najip Ali, Dua M Production Singapore)
- 2008 - Projek Cherpen-Dual, Leading (Singapore)
- 2008 - Satu Jam-Tele-Movie, Leading (Singapore)
- 2008 - Pesta, Pesta, Pesta, Hosting (Dua M Production-Singapore)
- 2008 - Atas Heights, Episodic, Supporting (Eaglevision Production-Singapore)
- 2008 - Dendam 26 Episodic, Leading (AMC Production-Malaysia)
- 2008 - Apa Itu Cinta-Episodic, Guest Appearance (Mariana Hashim Production-Malaysia)
- 2008 - Teratak Kasih Tok Mak- Tele-Movie, Supporting (Eurofine Production-Malaysia)
- 2008 - Kasihnya Kian Pudar, Tele-Movie, Supporting (Grand Brilliance Production-Malaysia)
- 2008 - Yusuf, Episodic, Guest Appearance (AMC Production-Malaysia)
- 2008 - Noktah Pilu, Main Cast, 26 Episode (Eurofine Production-Malaysia)
- 2008 - Mentadak, Guest Appearance, Tele-Movie (Eurofine Production-Malaysia)
- 2010-Kitchen Beib (Global TV-Indonesia)
- 2010-Namanya Juga Perempuan, FTV-Leading (Rumah Pohon Production-Indonesia)
- 2010-Golok Ciomas, FTV-Supporting (Citra Sinema Production-Indonesia)
- 2010–2011 Arti Sahabat Series-Supporting (Rapi Films-Indonesia)
- 2011–2012- Menjamu Tamu (Trans TV-Indonesia)
- 2012–2012- Koki Jelang Siang (Trans TV-Indonesia)
- 2015- Host-Hari Raya Program (Sinar Lebaran)
- 2019 - Hilang Kasih Di Sarajevo(Episodic) - Main Cast (Singapore)
- 2026 - Sinar Lebaran (Mediacorp Singapore)
