= Johann Friedrich Riedel =

German Protestant missionary (1798–1860)

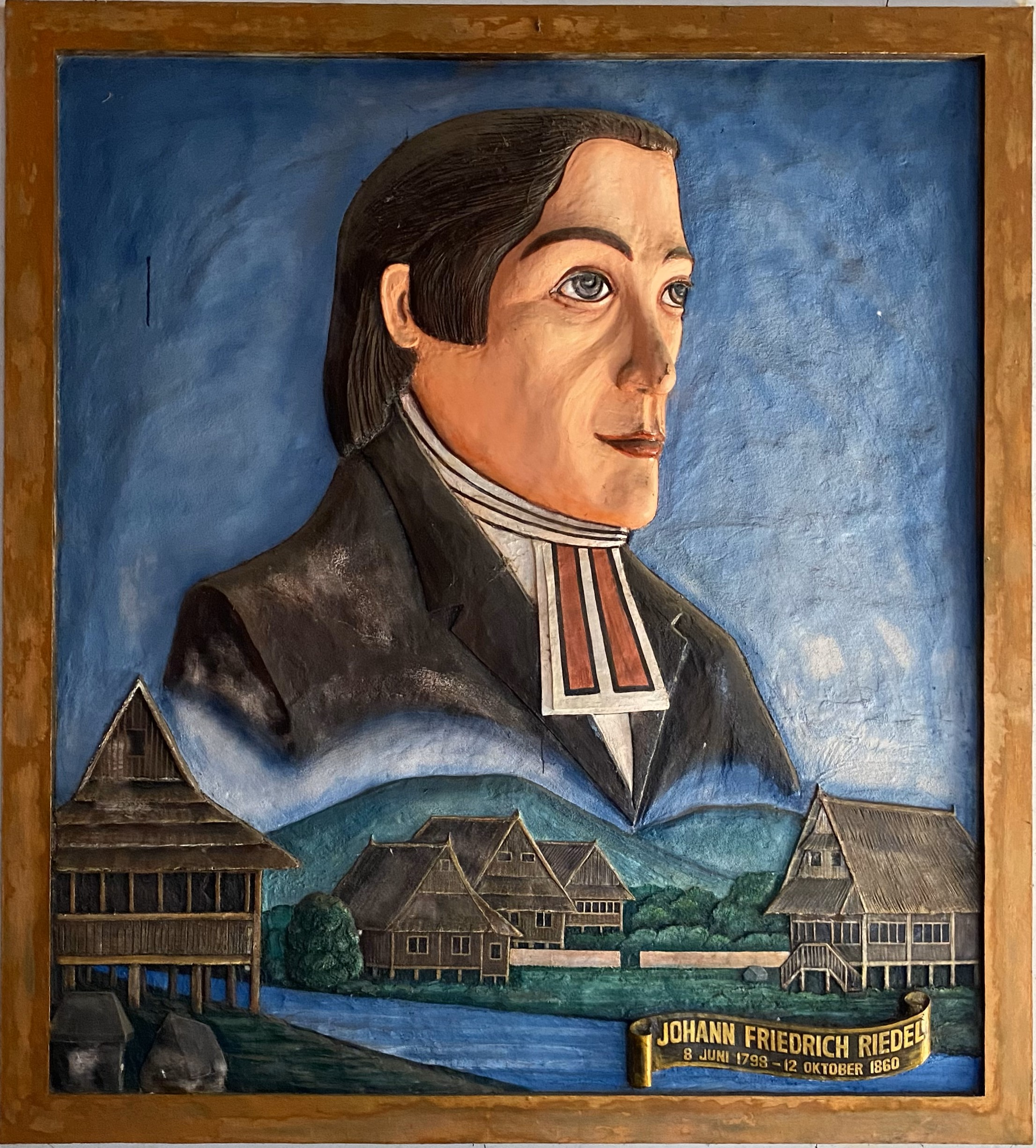
- A relief of Riedel from a Tondano church

Personal life
- Born: 8 June 1798 Erfurt, Holy Roman Empire
- Died: 12 October 1860 (aged 62) Tondano, Dutch East Indies

Religious life
- Religion: Christianity
- Denomination: Protestant
- Institute: Netherlands Missionary Society

Johann Friedrich Riedel (8 June 1798 – 12 October 1860) was a German Protestant missionary best known for his evangelism efforts to the Minahasa people of Indonesia in the nineteenth century. He was primarily active in the town of Tondano between 1831 and his death in 1860. Throughout his career, he baptised over 9,000 people. Riedel and fellow missionary Johann Gottlieb Schwarz are celebrated by the Christian Evangelical Church in Minahasa as the pioneers of Christianity in the region.

== Early life ==
Riedel was born on 8 June 1798 in Erfurt to a merchant family, as one of six children. Riedel's father, Christian Emanuel Riedel, died during his childhood, and Riedel was raised by his grandparents. After apprenticing as a tailor in Graz, Riedel trained for missionary work at the Berlin Missionary School (1822–1827) and then at Rotterdam's mission house (1827–1829).

== Missionary work ==
Through the Netherlands Missionary Society (NZG), Riedel was assigned to proselytize to the Minahasan people in modern North Sulawesi, arriving there on 12 June 1831 with fellow German missionary Johann Gottlieb Schwarz. Riedel and Schwarz were assigned to the Minahasan interior, and Riedel established his mission at the town of Tondano on 14 October 1831. More missionaries would arrive after Riedel and Schwarz, and were assigned to various towns in the region.

His mission saw significant success – Riedel baptised 9,341 Minahasans between 1831 and 1860, with 3,851 receiving communion. In some cases, local Minahasan religious leaders were among the first to convert to Christianity. Aside from preaching, Riedel also initiated the construction of schools and churches, and practiced medicine. He also welcomed young Minahasans to stay at his home. His Sunday services, delivered in Malay and Tondano languages, had over 2,000 attendees by 1851. He also befriended Javanese Islamic leader Kyai Maja, who had been exiled to Tondano after the Java War.

== Family and death ==
While on his way to his mission, Riedel was delayed for five months at Ambon, Maluku. There, he met Maria Williams, daughter of the Resident of Haruku Island, and the two married in May 1831, five days before Riedel's departure to Manado. During his time at Tondano, Riedel had one son, Johann G. F. Riedel, who later served in the Dutch East Indies government and became Resident of Timor and Ambon, and four daughters, who later married missionaries. Maria Williams died in Tondano in 1841, and Riedel would remarry in 1846, but his second wife died after four years.

Riedel died at Tondano on 12 October 1860, and was buried there. By 1880, twenty years after Riedel's death, eighty percent of Minahasa's population had converted to Christianity, and the modern Christian Evangelical Church in Minahasa commemorates Riedel and Schwarz as pioneers of Christianity in the region, celebrating their arrival at Manado on 12 June 1831 as the beginning of Minahasan Christianity.
