= Olivia Mariamne Devenish =

Wife of Stamford Raffles (1771–1814)

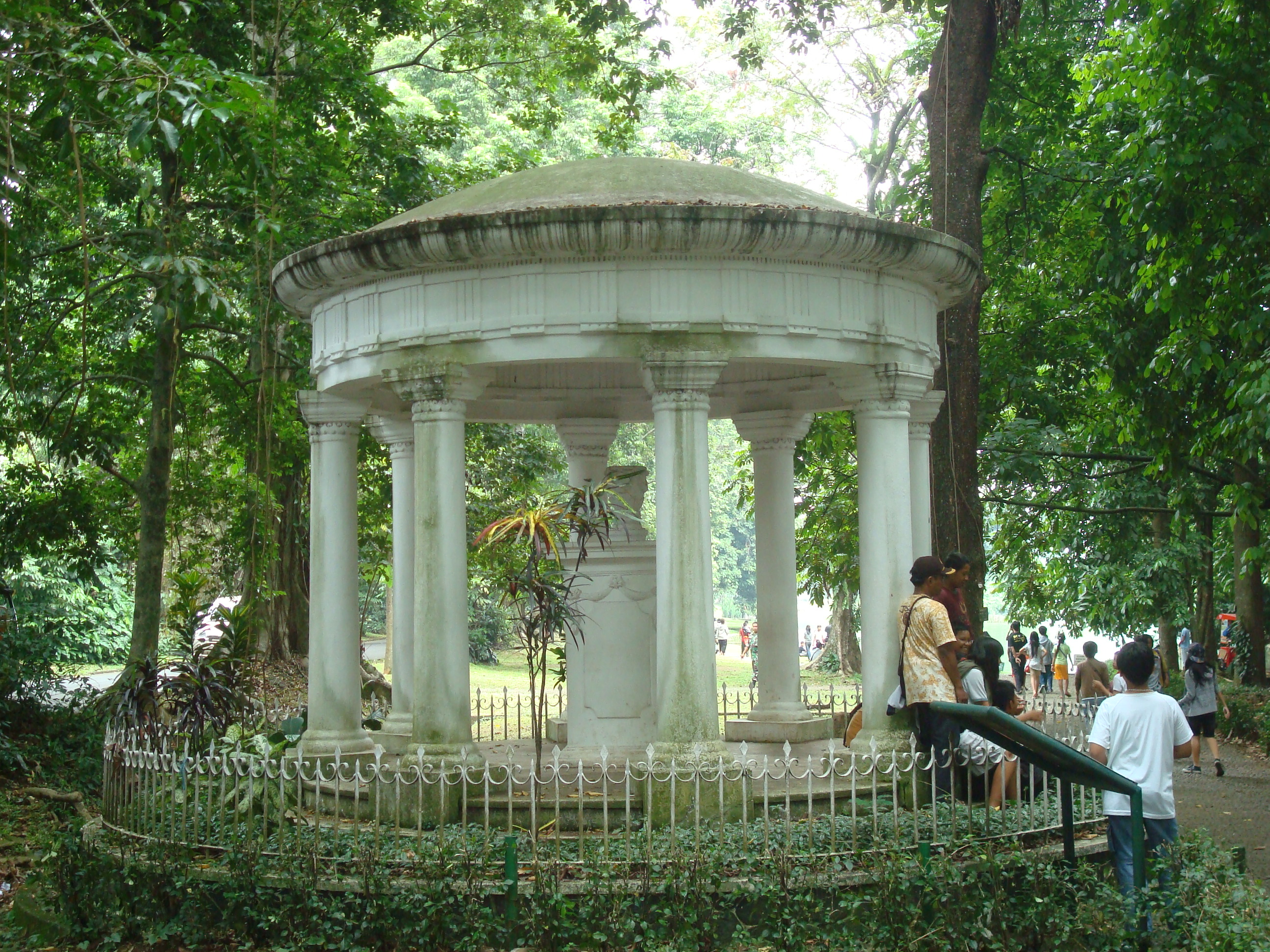
- Olivia Devenish Memorial, Bogor
- Born: 16 February 1771; Madras, Madras Presidency, British India
- Died: 26 November 1814 (aged 43); Buitenzorg, West Java, Dutch East Indies
- Burial place: Kebon Jahe Kober cemetery, Batavia, Dutch East Indies
- Monuments: Lady Raffles Memorial, Bogor Botanical Gardens, Buitenzorg, West Java, Indonesia
- Known for: The first wife of Sir Stamford Raffles
- Spouses: Jacob Cassivelaun Fancourt (m. 1793; died 1800) Stamford Raffles (m. 1805)
- Father: George/Godfrey Devenish

Olivia Mariamne Devenish (16 February 1771 – 26 November 1814) was the wife of Sir Stamford Raffles, vice governor of Java (1811–1816) from 1805 to 1814. A monument was erected to her memory in the botanical garden of Buitenzorg (Bogor).

== Biography ==
Olivia Mariamne Devenish was born on 16 February 1771 in Madras Presidency, India. The daughter of George or Godfrey Devenish, she was raised in Ireland. Olivia was married in Madras in 1793 to Jacob Cassivelaun Fancourt, who died in 1800, and in 1805 in London to Thomas Stamford Raffles. It was commonly said that her second husband, Raffles, was helped in his career through her relationship with his superior.

While Stamford Raffles was governor on Java, she introduced many social reforms in her capacity as first lady, which set the standard for the rest of the century. She showed herself by the side of her husband at official occasions, such as visits to the native rulers, and held receptions for people of all sexes and ethnicity, which was new on Java, as white women had previously isolated themselves from the native population.

At this point, the Western colonists at Java mixed their European habits with East Indian ones: for example, white women born in the East Indies used areca catechu, and they only dressed in European fashion on official occasions, such as going to church, receptions and visits, and otherwise wore the more comfortable Asian dress kebaya and sarong. These habits contributed to what European visitors regarded to be the decadence of the colonial lifestyle in the Dutch East Indies. Devenish banned the common use of chewing areca catechu by Western women, and removed the pots for this from the reception rooms of the governor's residence to prevent her guests from using it. She also banned the wearing of the Asian sarong and kebaya gowns by Western women.

These informal social reforms remained in place for the rest of the 19th century. It was not until the late 19th century, however, that it became common for Western women in Java to dress in Western clothes in their everyday life, the climate making the Western corset and many skirts uncomfortable.

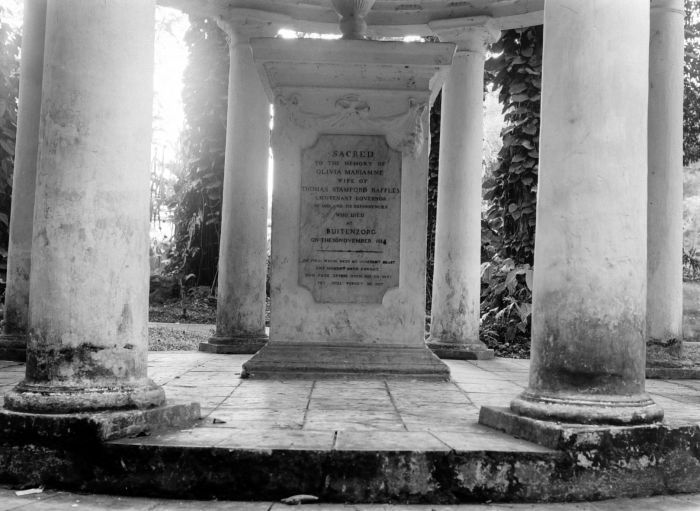
The memorial to Olivia Mariamne, Raffles' first wife, erected by him along the Kanarielaan in the National Botanical Gardens (now the Bogor Botanical Gardens). Raffles re-landscaped these gardens, which were established in 1744 in Buitenzorg (now Bogor), West Java.

She died in Buitenzorg, West Java, on 26 November 1814, and was buried in Batavia, Dutch East Indies. Her tomb can still be seen in Taman Prasasti Museum, the former European cemetery of Batavia that had been converted into a museum.

== Legacy ==
On the monument that was erected for her in National Botanical Gardens, Buitenzorg, it is written:

"Sacred to the memory of Olivia Marianne, wife of Thomas Stamford Raffles, Lieutenant-Governor of Java and its dependencies, who died at Buitenzorg on the 26th November, 1814.

Oh thou Whom Neer My Constant Heart, One Moment Hath Forgot, Tho Fate Severe Hath Bid Us Part, Yet Still Forget Me Not"

The British author Charlotte Louisa Hawkins Dempster claimed in her memoir, The Manners of My Time (1920), that she was Olivia's great-great-granddaughter through Captain John Hamilton Dempster, the illegitimate younger half brother of George Dempster of Dunnichen and Skibo, a director of the East India Company from 1769, and a key figure of the Scottish Enlightenment movement.
