= Johann Gottlieb Schwarz =

German missionary (1800–1859)

Personal life
- Born: 21 April 1800 Königsberg, Kingdom of Prussia
- Died: 1 February 1859 (aged 58) Manado, Dutch East Indies

Religious life
- Religion: Christianity
- Denomination: Protestant
- Institute: Netherlands Missionary Society

Johann Gottlieb Schwarz (21 April 1800 – 1 February 1859) was a German Protestant missionary who was active in proselytization to the Minahasan people in the nineteenth century. He established his mission at the town of Langowan, in modern Minahasa Regency. He is today celebrated by the Christian Evangelical Church in Minahasa as a pioneer of Christianity in the region, along with Johann Friedrich Riedel.

== Early life ==
Schwarz was born on 21 April 1800 in Königsberg. In his youth, he worked as a shoemaker. He joined the Berlin Missionary School in 1822, studying there until 1825 before continuing at Rotterdam's missionary school. He met Johann Friedrich Riedel, a fellow missionary-in-training, at Berlin. They completed their training in 1829, and left for the Dutch East Indies in November 1830 under the Netherlands Missionary Society.

== Missionary work ==
The two arrived at Manado on 12 June 1831. After spending some time to learn local languages, Riedel proceeded to Tondano that year, Schwarz had to leave shortly after to purchase required supplies and upon his return he settled in 1832 at the town of Kakas. He intended to establish his mission at the town of Langowan, southeast of Lake Tondano, but his house there would only be completed in 1834.

Schwarz's initial proselytization in Langowan saw local resistance, especially from the local district chief of Langowan. He also faced difficulties due to his poor grasp of local languages. Regardless, by 1838, he had managed to baptize over 100 people, aided by his distribution of medical supplies. Among those converted by Schwarz was Tawaijln Sigar, the new district chief of Langowan. The eighth President of Indonesia, Prabowo Subianto, is a descendant of Tawaijln through his mother. After Tawaijln's baptism in 1841, the number of converts at Langowan grew rapidly, and by 1848 Schwarz had baptized around 3,000 people. The first church at Langowan was established in 1847, at a former Alifuru temple. Schwarz also proselytized at settlements further to the south of Langowan.

== Death ==
Schwarz died at Manado on 1 February 1859, and he was buried at Langowan the following day. Around twenty years after Schwarz's (and Riedel's) death, in 1880, around eighty percent of the Minahasan population had converted to Christianity. In the present, the Christian Evangelical Church in Minahasa (GMIM) celebrates Schwarz and Riedel's arrival to Manado on 12 June 1831 as the founding of Christianity in Minahasa.

A statue of Schwarz was set in front of the GMIM church in Langowan. In 2021, Prabowo Subianto (then Minister of Defense) commissioned a bronze statue of Schwarz in order to replace the older statue, which was moved to Schwarz's grave at the church's yard. His former house in Langowan is today a Christian high school.
