= Fajar Legian Siswanto =

Indonesian footballer

Fajar Legian
Personal information
- Full name: Fajar Legian Siswanto
- Date of birth: 27 August 1987 (age 39)
- Place of birth: Jakarta, Indonesia
- Height: 1.77 m (5 ft 9 1/2 in)
- Position: Midfielder

Youth career
- 2007–2008: PON Jakarta

Senior career*
Years	Team	Apps	(Gls)
2009–2010	Persih Tembilahan	??	(1)
2010–2015	Persisam Putra	60	(3)
2015–2016	Semen Padang	0	(0)
2016–2017	Persepam Madura Utama	28	(4)
- * Club domestic league appearances and goals as of 14:22, 18 December 2014 (UTC)

Fajar Legian Siswanto (born August 27, 1987) is an Indonesian former footballer. He was born in Indonesia to a German father and Balinese mother.

== Club statistics ==
Club	Season	Super League		Premier Division		Piala Indonesia		Total	
Club	Season	Apps	Goals	Apps	Goals	Apps	Goals	Apps	Goals
Persisam Putra Samarinda	2010-11	21	0	-		-		21	0
Persisam Putra Samarinda	2011-12	23	1	-		-		23	1
Total		44	1	-		-		44	1
