= Marintan Sirait =

Marintan Sirait (born 1960) is a prominent female transdisciplinary performance artist based in Bandung, Indonesia. Recognised as one of Indonesia's pioneer female performance artist, she has consistently focused on researching, thinking about and expressing complex relations between the body, self, Nature and spirituality. Her seminal performance art work, Membangun Rumah, is a result of that research and expression, and she has performed it in many countries, biennales and exhibitions. She has also been instrumental in initiating crossart platforms and collaborations involving artists, the youth and different communities in Indonesia.

== Background and education ==
Marintan Sirait was born in Braunschweig, Germany, and based in Bandung, Indonesia. Her father is Batak, while her mother is a German self-taught painter. Her sister, Ruth Sirait, is a Bandung-based fashion designer and contemporary artist, and one of her brothers, Pintor Sirait, is an acclaimed Indonesian contemporary artist and sculptor working with stainless steel. She has another brother who is not involved in the arts scene.

Sirait graduated from the Ceramics Department of Institut Teknologi Bandung, Indonesia in 1987, but was already working as a ceramist-artist before graduation.

Sirait is acknowledged as one of Indonesia's first female performance artists, and an instrumental figure in bringing together cross artform dialogues and experimentations through different projects. She found national and international prominence as a performance artist in the 1990s, took a hiatus from the arts in the early 2000s, but returned in 2012 to stage performances again.

== Artistic Practices ==
Sirait was involved in a theatre group between 1982 and 1983 called the STB in Bandung, and the Endo Suanda Dance Theatre between 1983 and 1985. These experiences of theatre and dance contributed to an awareness to her body's sensibilities, which she further developed and created sculptural ceramics based on gestural approaches. She later moved to cultivating clay in relation to body awareness instead of making ceramic pieces, when she realised that this raw material of ceramic was important for her to improve her art expression through body movement.

Sirati's works became more conceptual between 1988 and 1993 as she continued focusing on the body and its complex relations with nature, the earth, culture and the self, using ready-made materials and photography. As she did not like how artworks became objects, or were subjected to conventions, she subsequently focused on the process of her artistic practice, which was to her the most important aspect of artistic creativity, through her body. Sirait later found clay limiting in expressing her self, and changed to using clay dust which gave her the feeling of deconstructing awareness of her self, and finding earth and Nature.

Her connection with soil/the earth since childhood is associated deeply with a sense of being at home, and at the same time, an extension of connection with nature and women's life-giving power.

Her artistic practice and mediums have ranged from drawings and paintings, to installations and performance art, with a continued focus on her body. Sirait understands the body to be a conduit and container for sakti, or primordial consciousness. For the body to be such a conduit, it has to first be transformed, disciplined and its imposes subjugated. In so doing, the body's mind and psyche can then be expanded, allowing her and her audience or collaborators to connect in ritual, and transgress bodily and psycho-spiritual limitations.

== Artworks ==
=== Membangun Rumah (1994-2022) ===
One of Marintan Sirait's seminal performance art work is Membangun Rumah (meaning Building a House), which she started working on since 1994. Membangun Rumah hence consists of many iterations over the period of 1994-2022 in various exhibitions across many countries.

This performance artwork expressed connections she had realised between the body and its surrounding environment. It was also Sirati's expression of resistance to the experience of an alienated self and body, in reference to Indonesia's oppressive period under the regime of the New Order.

Membangun Rumah consists of an installation art piece consisting of cone-shaped earthen mounds arranged together with sand, ash and light, and other materials found at her performance locations. It also featured a performance artwork where Sirait would usually start by drawing a circle with her finger in the sand surrounding the mounds, and then cover her body with sand. She would then proceed to create lines from the dark soil, as if connecting the cones or transforming them into a new form. Sometimes, Sirait would create and paint these fluid lines with her hands throughout the exhibition hall's floor.

Each iteration was different in terms of her movements and form as well as the extent of performance space, depending on the gallery or performance space. She also often invited the audience to participate in this work, contributing to notions of incompleteness or not becoming fixed, which for her, was also how she understood the body to be. She would also sometimes incorporate sound recordings of crickets, dripping water and experimental live music to bring about a visual art/sound/body movement constellation.

Some of Membangun Rumah's performances have taken place in the 23rd Bienal Internacional Sâo Paulo (1996), the second Asia Pacific Triennial (APT 2) at the Queensland Art Gallery, Brisbane (1996), the Jakarta Biennale in 2017 and the Para Sekutu yang Tidak Bisa Berkata Tidak (The Acquiescent Allies) at Galeri Nasional Indonesia in 2022.

=== Sound of the Body (1993-1994) ===
Sound of the Body was a performance artwork created in response to her husband, Andar Manik's artwork, Crackling. This was a performance work where Sirait was completely covered in mud, and moved slowly towards a ring of fire around Crackling, in her own mode of dance/ritual.

== Artistic and Community Contributions ==
In 1988, Sirait co-founded Sumber Waras (Fountain of Health) with a group of experimental artists. Together, they explored awareness of the body through movement in relation to the visual arts and sound.

She and her husband, Andar Manik, also a graduate from Institut Teknologi Bandung, Indonesia, co-founded Jendela Ide (Window of Ideas) in 1995, a non-profit arts institute and special cultural institution catering to children and youth. They also created an artist-musician family compound, called the Dalemwangi Art Space, which is akin to a laboratory space that seeks collaborations across art forms, and develop shared experiences with them, their participants and audience.

Sirait also started Rumpun Indonesia Foundation, a women's media centre focusing on social change, as well as the Kalyana Learning Centre in 2020.
