= Frank Latimore =

American actor

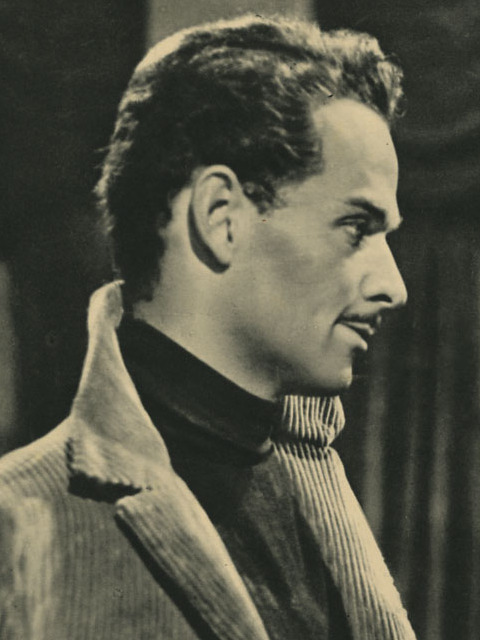
- Latimore in La nemica (1952)
- Born: Franklin Latimore Kline; September 28, 1925; Darien, Connecticut, US
- Died: November 29, 1998 (aged 73); Denville Hall, London, England, UK
- Occupation: Actor
- Years active: 1944–1978
- Spouse(s): Valentina Nikitina (m. 1948; div. 1956) Rukmini Sukarno (m. 1967)
- Children: 1

Franklin Latimore (born Franklin Latimore Kline; September 28, 1925 – November 29, 1998) was an American actor.

== Life and career ==
Latimore was born in Darien, Connecticut. He came from a well-to-do family, and was able to trace his lineage back to the American Revolutionary War. He ran away from home at an early age, and shortly thereafter got the lead part in a Broadway play. He appeared as "Franklin Kline" in the original Broadway production of Janie, which opened September 10, 1942, at Henry Miller's Theatre and ran 642 performances, directed by Antoinette Perry (the "Tony" of the Tony Awards). He began his acting career in the 1930s, when he and longtime friend Lloyd Bridges performed in summer stock theater at a playhouse in Weston, Vermont. Lloyd Bridges worked as a drama teacher at Cherry Lawn School in Darien, Connecticut, the exact town where Franklin Latimore was born and where his family lived. This is very likely how they knew each other. Lloyd Bridges also helped launch the Weston Playhouse's first professional summer season in 1937.

Latimore then went to Hollywood where he signed a contract with 20th Century-Fox, and proceeded to appear in such hits as In the Meantime, Darling, The Dolly Sisters, Three Little Girls in Blue, and Shock.

After his years at Fox, he made films in Europe, most of which were swashbucklers such as Balboa, Conquistador of the Pacific, The Golden Falcon, Devil's Cavaliers, and many others, including two Zorro films and some westerns. These were starring roles, much bigger than his Hollywood roles, to the effect that he became the darling of the swashbucklers during the late 50s and early 60s. He appeared in the French film Purple Noon, as well as in the Italian melodrama A Woman Has Killed (1952). He also dubbed several European films into English.

Latimore appeared in two soap operas, playing Dr. Ed Coleridge on Ryan's Hope from 1975 to 1976, and Dr. Emmet Scott on Guiding Light from 1976 to 1979. He did some work for PBS, most notably appearing in a film about the Civil War.

While working in Rome, Italy, in the late 1940s, Latimore met and married Russian-born Valentina Nikitina (December 24, 1920 – March 8, 2009) in 1948. Their civil marriage took place in Rome, Italy, and they settled in New York City shortly thereafter. In 1956, their marriage ended in divorce, but she kept her married name, Latimore, throughout her lifetime.

He married Rukmini Sukarno, an opera singer who was a daughter of President Sukarno of Indonesia, in 1967. Their son, Chris Kline, is a journalist who was born in 1964.

On November 29, 1998, he died in his sleep, at the age of 73. His remains were cremated and buried beneath a venerable old apple tree on ancestral property in Vermont.

== Selected filmography ==
- In the Meantime, Darling (1944) – Lt. Daniel Ferguson
- The Dolly Sisters (1945) – Irving Netcher
- 13 Rue Madeleine (1946) – Jeff Lassiter
- Shock (1946) – Lt. Paul Stewart
- Three Little Girls in Blue (1946) – Steve Harrington
- The Razor's Edge (1946) – Bob MacDonald
- Black Magic (1949) – Gilbert de Rezel
- Yvonne of the Night (1949) – Il tenente Carlo Rutelli
- Il caimano del Piave (1951) – Franco
- The Ungrateful Heart (1951) – Enrico De Marchi
- A Woman Has Killed (1952) – Capt. Roy Prescott
- At Sword's Edge (1952) – Don Ruy
- Three Forbidden Stories (1952) – Walter (Third segment)
- The Enemy (1952) – Roberto
- Sul ponte dei sospiri (1953) – Capitan Vessillo
- Neapolitans in Milan (1953) – Parenti
- Captain Phantom (1953) – Miguel, Duke of Canabil
- For You I Have Sinned (1953) – Reder
- Vestire gli ignudi (1954) – Franco Laspiga
- Papà Pacifico (1954) – Carlo Torquati
- Mata Hari's Daughter (1954) – Douglas Kent
- The Prince with the Red Mask (1955) – Masuccio, il principe dalla maschera rossa
- L'ultimo amante (1955) – Giorgio
- Il falco d'oro (1955) – Simone
- Lo spadaccino misterioso (1956) – Riccardo Degli Argentari
- Terrore sulla città (1957)
- Historias de la feria (1958) – Alfredo
- Cuatro en la frontera (1958) – Javier
- Secretaria para todo (1958) – Carlos García van Waguen
- Conspiracy of the Borgias (1959) – Guido di Belmonte
- John Paul Jones (1959) – Lt. Richard Dale
- Devil's Cavaliers (1959) – Capt. Richard Stiller
- Purple Noon (1960) – O'Brien
- Seven in the Sun (1960) – Frank
- Les Scélérats (1960) – Ted
- The Gallant Hours (1960) – Halsey's Aide (uncredited)
- Then There Were Three (1961) – Lt. Willotsky
- Capitaine tempête (1961)
- Rosa de Lima (1961) – Don Gil de Cepeda
- Zorro the Avenger (1962) – Don José de la Torre – El Zorro
- Shades of Zorro (1962) – Don José de la Torre – El Zorro
- The Shortest Day (1963) – Un soldato siciliano (uncredited)
- Los Conquistadores Del Pacífico (1963) – Vasco Núñez de Balboa
- Juego de hombres (1963)
- Apache Fury (1964) – Mayor Steve Loman
- Cavalry Charge (1964) – Corporal Paul White
- Hotel of Dead Guests (1965) – Larry Cornell
- Los cuatreros (1965) – Ladd
- Cast a Giant Shadow (1966) – 1st U.N. Officer
- The Honey Pot (1967) – Revenue Agent (scenes deleted)
- The Sergeant (1968) – Capt. Loring
- If It's Tuesday, This Must Be Belgium (1969) – George (uncredited)
- Patton (1970) – Lt. Col. Henry Davenport
- Rosolino Paternò, soldato... (1970) – American Lieutenant
- Mafia Connection (1970) – The American
- Le foto proibite di una signora per bene (1970) – Peter (English version, voice, uncredited)
- Confessions of a Police Captain (1971) – Traini (English version, voice, uncredited)
- The Designated Victim (1971) – Stefano (English version, voice, uncredited)
- A Bay of Blood (1971) – Frank (English version, voice, uncredited)
- Hector the Mighty (1972) – Hector (English version, voice, uncredited)
- Una mujer prohibida (1974) – Jaime
- The Girl in Room 2A (1974) – Johnson
- La encadenada (1975) – Alexander (English version, voice, uncredited)
- All the President's Men (1976) – Judge
