= Then There Were Three (film) =

- US film poster
- Directed by: Alex Nicol
- Written by: Frank Gregory; Allan Lurie
- Produced by: Alex Nicol
- Starring: Frank Latimore; Barry Cahill; Alex Nicol
- Cinematography: Gastone Di Giovanni
- Edited by: Manuel del Campo
- Music by: Tarcisio Fusco
- Production company: Alexandra Film
- Distributed by: Parade Releasing Organization
- Release date: November 1961 (US)
- Running time: 82 minutes (US)
- Country: Italy
- Language: English

Then There Were Three also known as Three Came Back (Italian: L'urlo dei Marines, French: Le Cri des Marines) is a 1961 black and white Italian war film produced and directed by as well as co-starring Alex Nicol with Frank Latimore and Barry Cahill.

== Plot summary ==
During the Italian campaign the Germans scheme to assassinate an Italian partisan leader held by the Americans. They infiltrate an English speaking assassin dressed in American uniform who joins a group of stragglers making their way to the village where the partisan leader is. During their journey the German infiltrator eliminates the American soldiers one by one.

== Cast ==
- Frank Latimore as Lt. Willotsky
- Barry Cahill as Sgt. Travers
- Alex Nicol as Pvt. Sam McLease
- Frederick R. Clark as Calhoun
- Sidney Clute as Pvt. Ben Harvey
- Brendan Fitzgerald
- Michael Billingsley as Pvt. T.I. Ellis
- Frank Gregory as Pvt. Harry Miller
- Gérard Herter as the German Colonel
