= Kebon Sirih (Transjakarta) =

Bus rapid transit station in Jakarta, Indonesia

1 13 Kebon Sirih
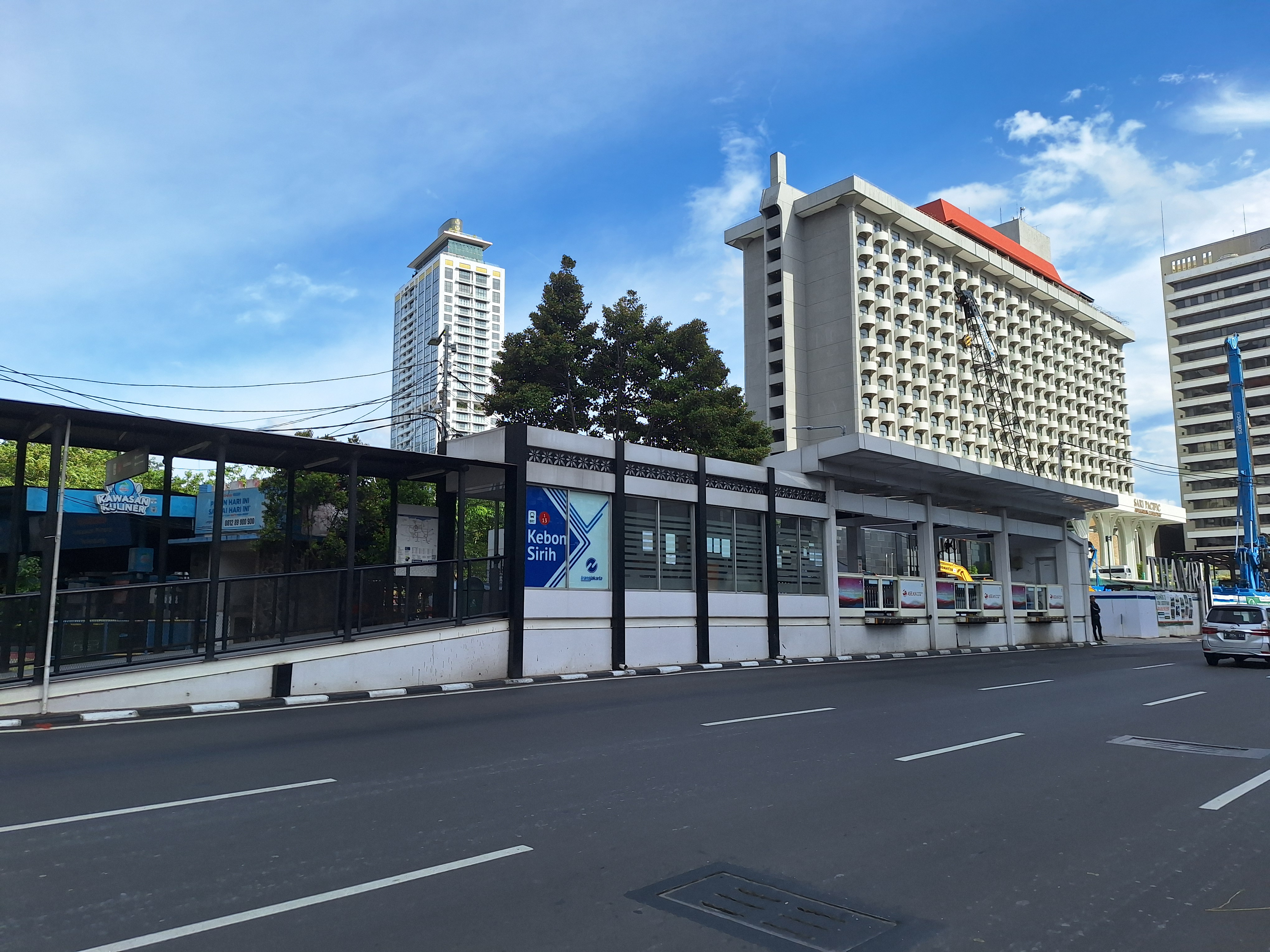

General information
- Location: M.H. Thamrin Street; Kebon Sirih, Menteng (eastern side, southbound); Gambir, Gambir (western side, northbound); Central Jakarta, Indonesia
- Coordinates: 6.1827°S 106.823°E
- System: Transjakarta bus rapid transit station
- Owner: Transjakarta
- Operator: Transjakarta
- Lines: List of Transjakarta corridors#Corridor 1 List of TransJakarta corridors#Cross-corridor routes
- Platforms: Two side platforms with separate paid area per platform

Construction
- Structure type: At-grade

Other information
- Status: In service with temporary buildings

History
- Opened: 15 January 2004 (soft launching); 1 February 2004 (commercial operation)
- Rebuilt: 19 December 2020 (temporary structures)
- Former names: Bank Indonesia

Services
| Preceding | | Following |
|---|---|---|
| M.H. Thamrin towards Blok M | Corridor 1 | Monumen Nasional towards Kali Besar |
| M.H. Thamrin towards Ragunan | Corridor 6 Route 6A | Balai Kota Terminus |
| M.H. Thamrin towards Ragunan | Corridor 6 Route 6B | Balai Kota Terminus |
Location

Kebon Sirih is a Transjakarta bus rapid transit station located on M.H. Thamrin Street, Kebon Sirih, Menteng, Central Jakarta, serving Corridor 1. It is named after the street located nearby. It is nearby the headquarters of the Central Bank of Indonesia (hence its former name).

== History ==
Kebon Sirih BRT station was opened along with corridor 1 on January 15, 2004, as Bank Indonesia station. It originally had a large, spacious design with three bus bays on each side of the platform. The station was accessible via a skybridge, before another access via a zebra crossing on the Kebon Sirih intersection to the south was opened in 2018.

Due to the ongoing construction of the Jakarta MRT phase 2A, Bank Indonesia station and its access skybridge was demolished in December 2020, replaced by a pair of temporary stations: initially northbound station east to Bank Indonesia, and southbound station in front of Thamrin 10. As the MRT construction site dynamically changes, the location for the temporary buildings have to be changed as well.

In late December 2023, Bank Indonesia BRT station was renamed to Kebon Sirih, as part of Transjakarta's "neutralization" of station names from third-party names (like Bank Indonesia as an example of a government agency), that would allow them to grant a naming right.

== Building and layout ==
The two temporary buildings of Kebon Sirih station currently in use are not connected, and with separate paid areas. Passengers are not allowed to change directions or making a transfer to the opposite direction without exiting paid area and paying again.

The two temporary buildings began to operate by December 2020. The west building for northbound buses is adjacent to the Bank Indonesia headquarters, while the east building for southbound buses was located in front of Thamrin 10. On September 22, 2024, the east building was moved to the front of Permata Bank, due to the MRT construction site relocation. The new structure only consisted of a container box with only two gates.

On January 18, 2025, the container box was removed and replaced again with a new structure resembling the original temporary structure built upon closure, with three gates. As the road is now far from the sidewalk where the station is located, each of the gate has a long linkway to bridge the gap between the bus and the main station building.

Below is the layout of the Kebon Sirih station platform based on the routes served, last updated on January 18, 2025:

West

↑

Kebon Sirih Street

↓
Side platform, the platform doors are opened on the left side of the direction of travel
M.H. Thamrin Street →
towards Kota (Monas) →

towards Balai Kota (Balai Kota) ↓

← (M.H. Thamrin)

towards Blok M and towards Ragunan
← M.H. Thamrin Street
Jakarta MRT construction site
↑
↑
↑

Jakarta MRT construction site

East
Side platform, the platform doors are opened on the left side of the direction of travel

== Non-BRT bus services ==
| Type | Route | Destination | Notes |
|---|---|---|---|
| Inner city feeder | | Tanah Abang Station—Gondangdia Station | Outside the station |
| Inner city feeder | | Senen—Blok M | Outside the station |
| Inner city feeder | | Tanah Abang Station—Senen | Outside the station |
| Inner city feeder | | Tanah Abang—Kampung Melayu | Outside the station |
| Inner city feeder | | Tanah Abang—Pasar Minggu | Outside the station |
| Royaltrans (premium) | | Cibubur Junction—Balai Kota | Outside the station |

== Places nearby ==
- Thamrin 10 Food and Creative Park
- Wisma Mandiri
- Ministry of Energy and Mineral Resources
- Ministry of Religious Affairs
- Bank Indonesia

== Incident ==
On October 8, 2020, then-named Bank Indonesia BRT station was damaged and vandalized during a protest against the Omnibus Law bill.

== Gallery ==
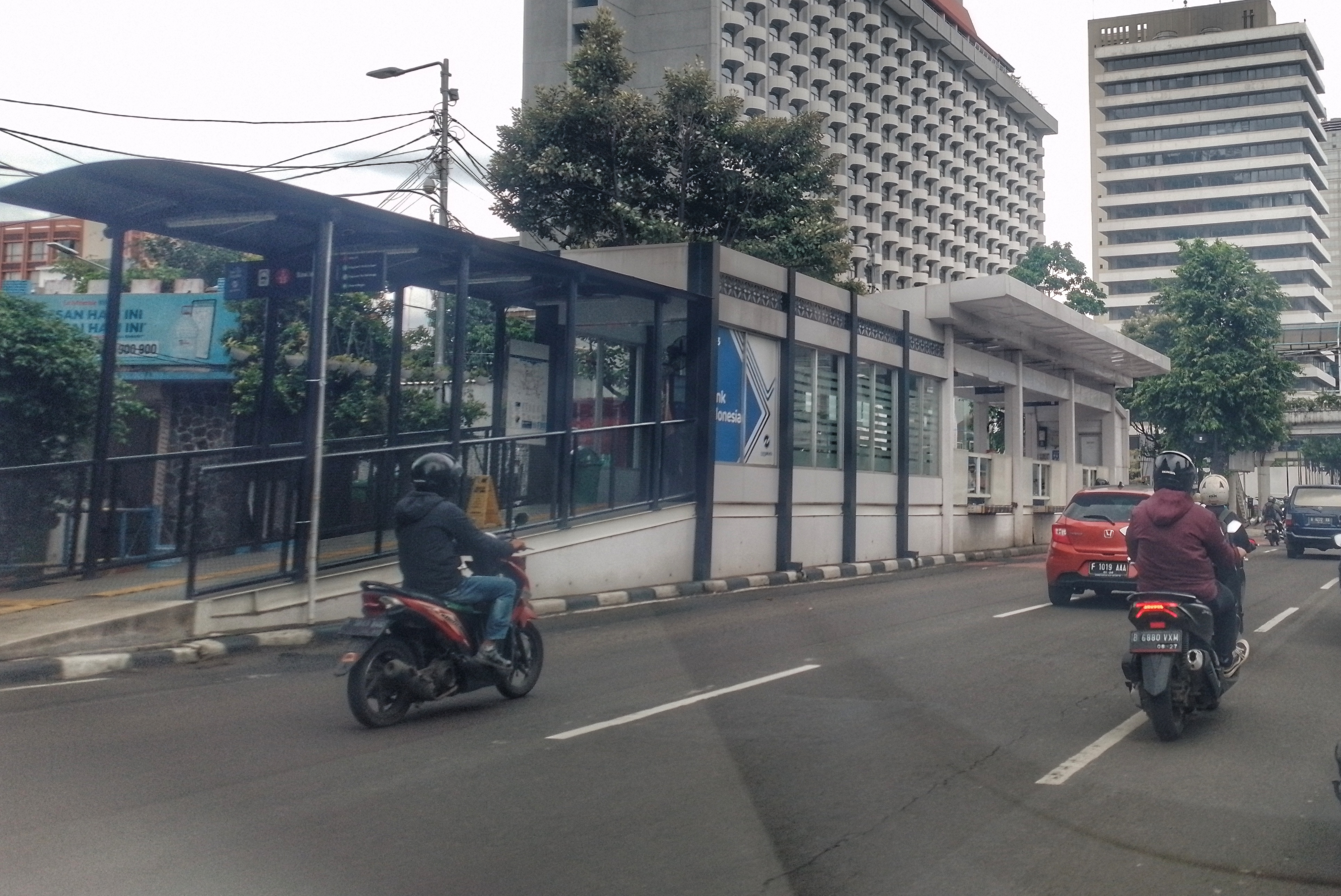
Temporary station serving southbound buses when it was still named Bank Indonesia, 2023

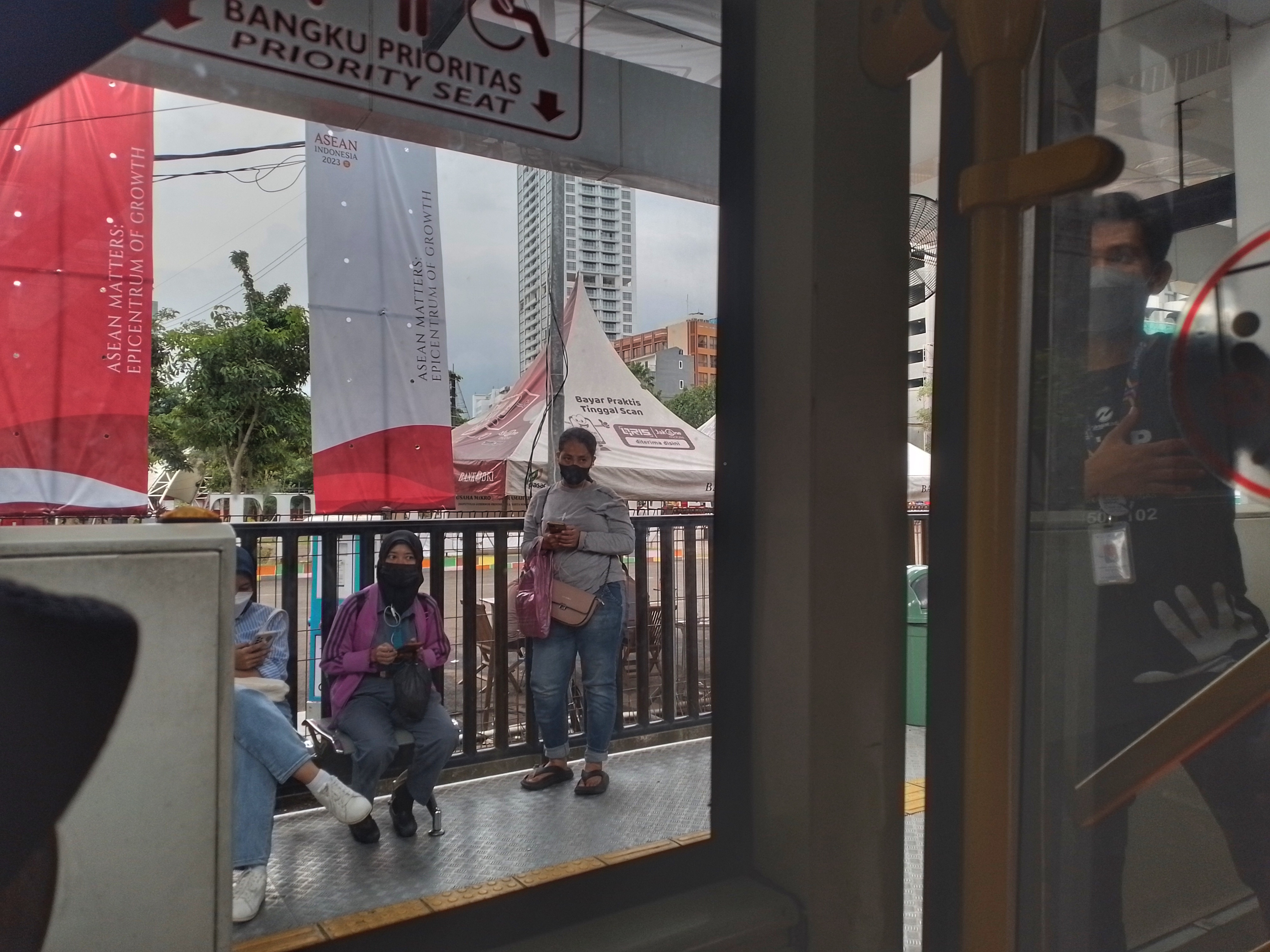
Interior of the temporary station serving southbound buses, 2023

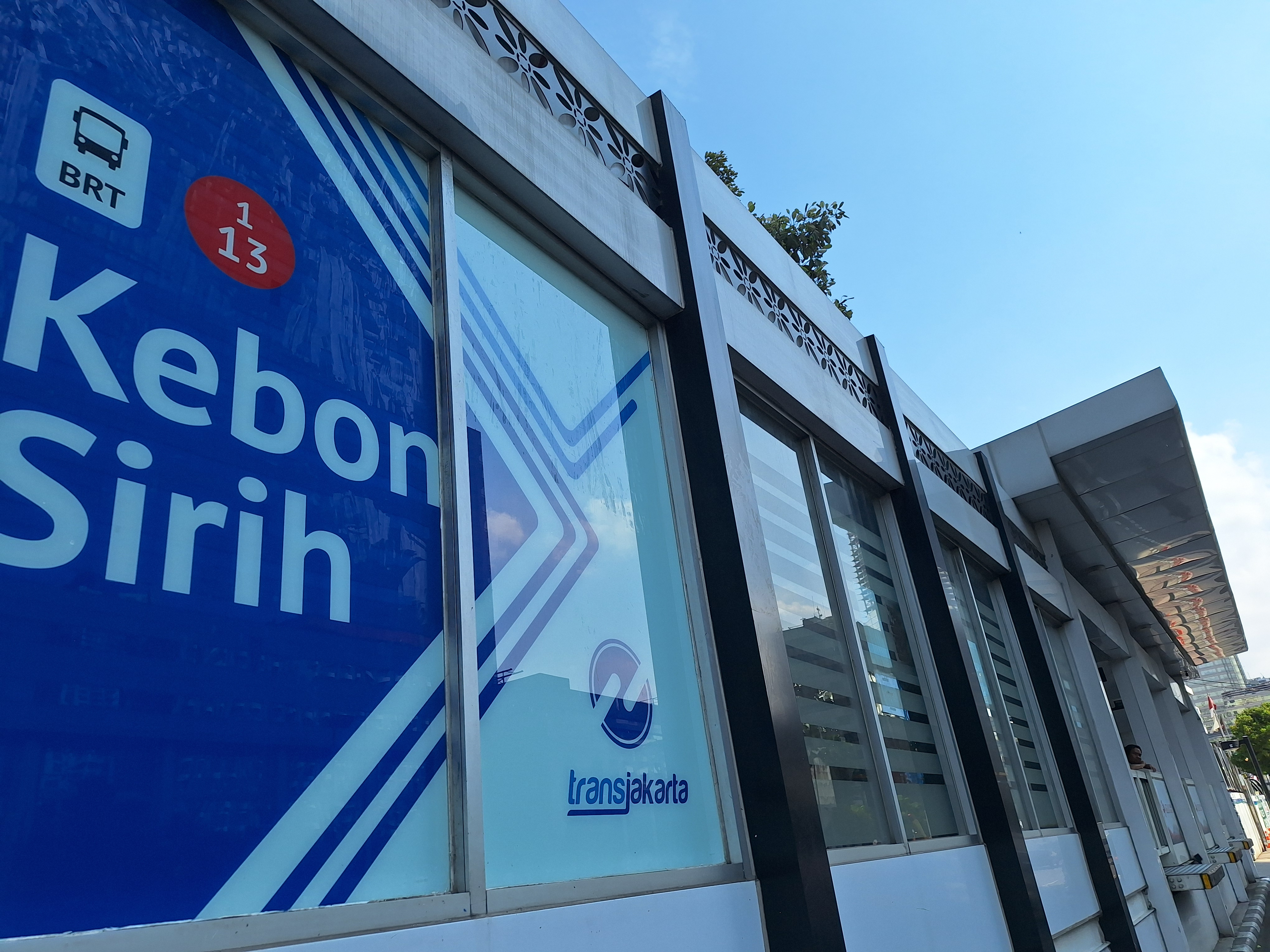
The new station name, January 2024

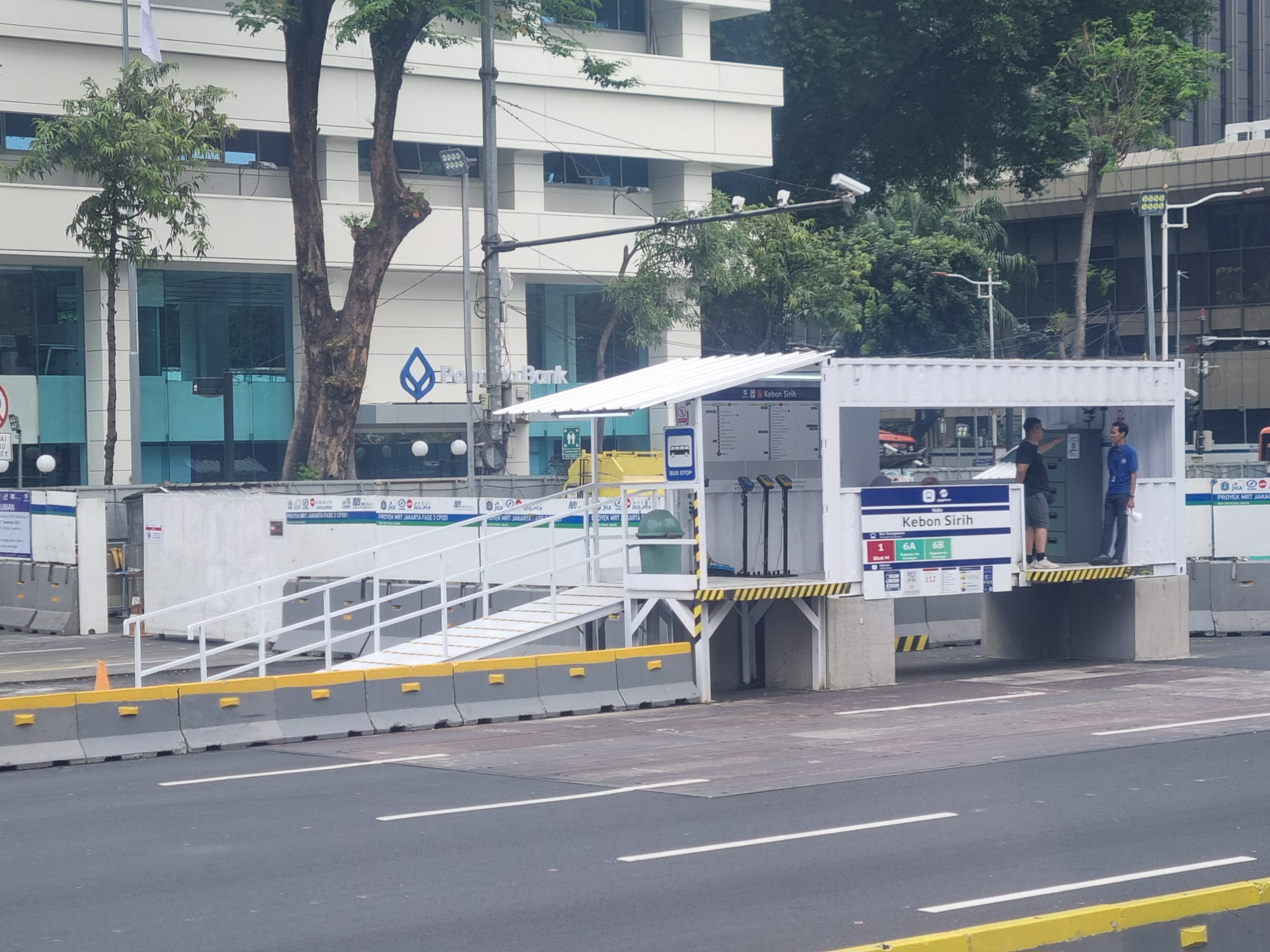
Temporary container box structure serving southbound buses, September 2024
