= All Saints Church, Jakarta =

Church in Indonesia

Coordinates: 6.183009°S 106.83511°E

All Saints Anglican Church Jakarta
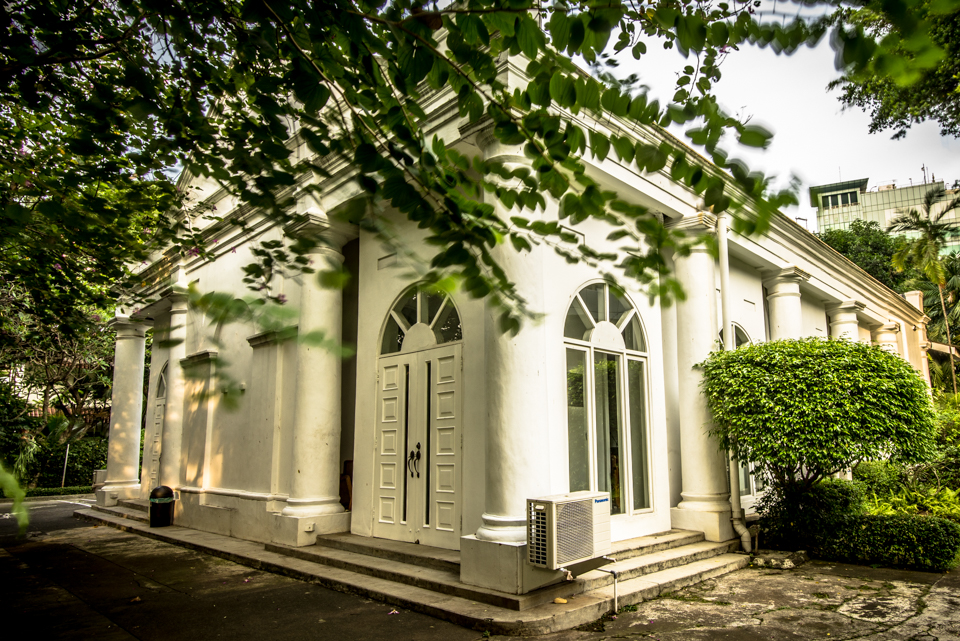
- The church building
- All Saints Anglican Church Jakarta
- Address: Kebon Sirih, Menteng, Central Jakarta
- Country: Indonesia
- Denomination: Anglican
- Website: www.allsaintsjakarta.org

History
- Status: Active
- Founded: 1819

Administration
- Diocese: Diocese of Singapore

All Saints Church, Jakarta, officially known as All Saints Anglican Church Jakarta (ASACJ), is an Anglican church located in Kebon Sirih Administrative Village, Menteng, Jakarta. It is the only Anglican parish in Indonesia but there are over 30 other Anglican churches throughout the country. The church is located in Jalan Arief Rahman Hakim, close to the Farmer's Statue. Built in 1832, it is among the oldest church in Indonesia. All Saints contains memorials to British soldiers who fell during World War I and World War II, as well as earlier memorials e.g. Lieutenant Colonel William Campbell (died in 1811).

== History ==
Land in Batavia was purchased by Rev. John Slater of the London Missionary Society in 1819 to establish a station for chaplains to disembark to Asian countries such as China or Japan. This makes All Saints Church amongst one of the first English-speaking institutions in Indonesia. On 7 January 1822, Reverend Walter Henry Medhurst was sent by London Missionary Society to work among the Chinese. In the same year, he built a bamboo church on the land. The bamboo church lasted until 1828 when a new church was built. The building was finished in 1829 in a Georgian Style, without the later extensions (the chancel, the sanctuary and the porch). At that time it was called English Church - in Dutch Engelse Kerk or in Indonesian Gereja Inggris.

The church became affiliated with the Church of England and the original layout was changed. A sanctuary was added in 1851. A small organ was installed in 1857. This is replaced with a larger organ which was placed in a newly built special room in 1863. In 1924, these two extensions were combined to form the chancel and sanctuary, the layout that exists to this day. In 1883, the British Protestant Community took over the church property. As a result, the name of the church was changed into Church of the British Protestant Community (BPC). Electricity was installed in 1909.

The British Protestant Community continued to own the property until April 1965, when the Australian ambassador Mick Shann transferred the property to the Indonesian Council of Churches as a gift. The church became known as All Saints Anglican Church in 1970 and currently serves an international community of more than 30 nationalities.

== See also ==
- List of church buildings in Indonesia
- List of colonial buildings and structures in Jakarta
