= Situ Lembang Park =

Park in Menteng, Jakarta, Indonesia

Taman Situ Menteng
- Location within Jakarta
- Type: Urban park
- Location: Menteng, Jakarta
- Coordinates: 6.198340°S 106.835153°E
- Owner: Pemprov DKI Jakarta
- Operator: Department of Parks and Cemetery, Jakarta
- Status: Open all year

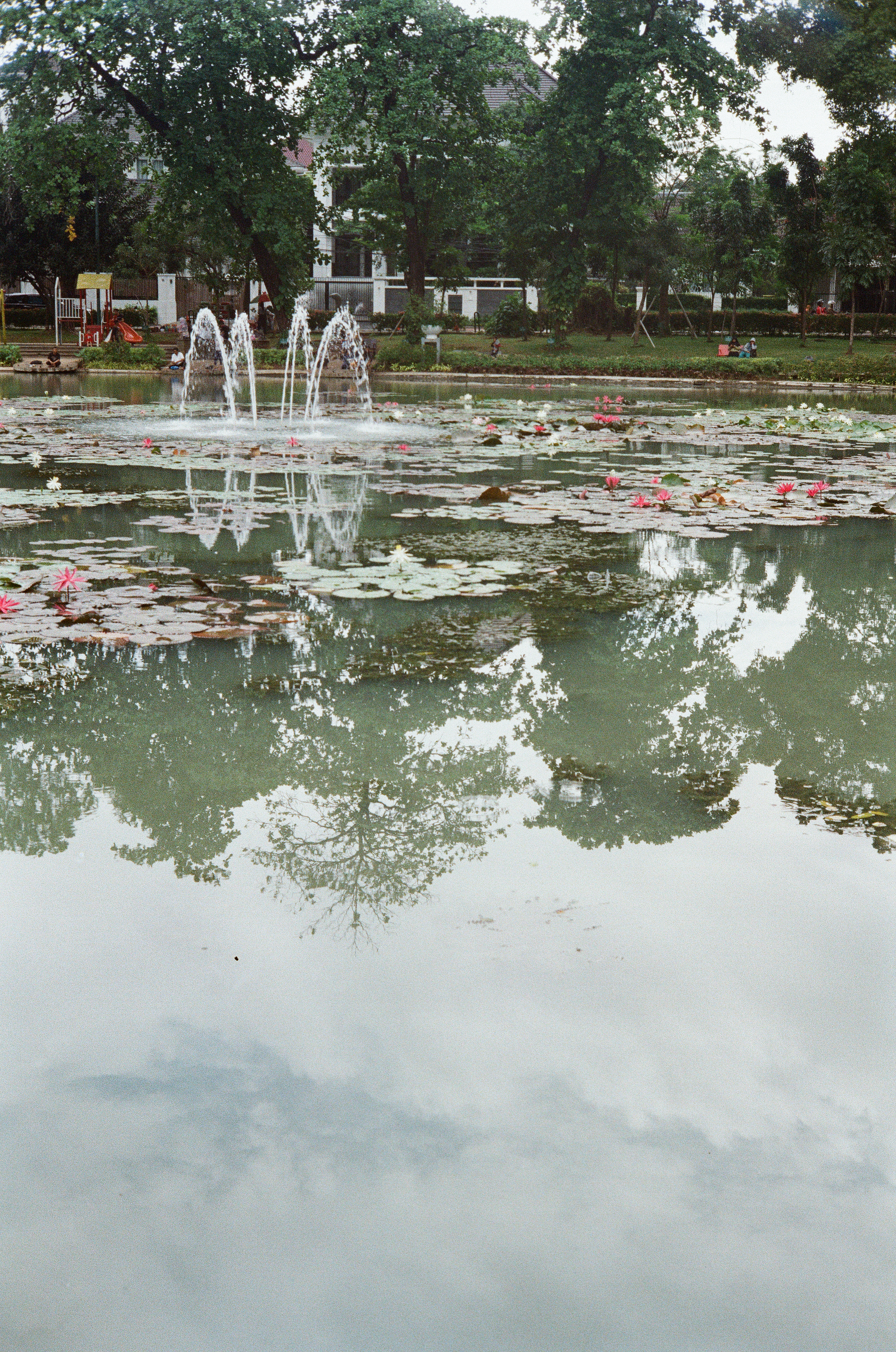
A fountain in the Situ Lembang Park

Situ Lembang Park (Indonesian: Taman Situ Lembang) is a park located at Menteng, Jakarta, Indonesia. Situ means lake, while Lembang is the name of the road adjacent the park. The park is nestled within houses of Menteng residential area and located close to another park Taman Suropati.

The park is one of the oldest parks in Jakarta, which has a lake. There are fishing facilities, running tracks and children's playgrounds in the park. There are also plenty of mobile food stall that sells variety of food and drink.

== History ==
At first the park was the Cideng river subsystem reservoir, to hold water from surrounding sources. It was built in 1918 The Municipal Government then added an open stage. In 1984 the department of parks of Jakarta renovated the lake, and added four fountains filled with lotus flowers, and fishing stalls. In 2002, the park was renovated again by the Parks Service so that it was more suitable for use as a public park.
