= Kebon Sirih, Menteng =

Kebon Sirih
- Administrative village
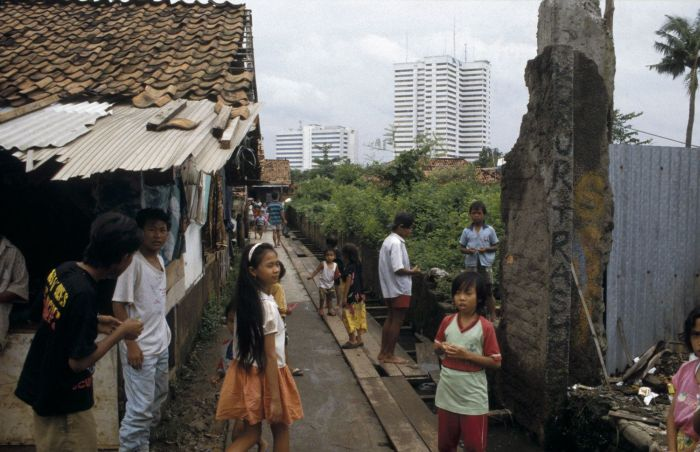
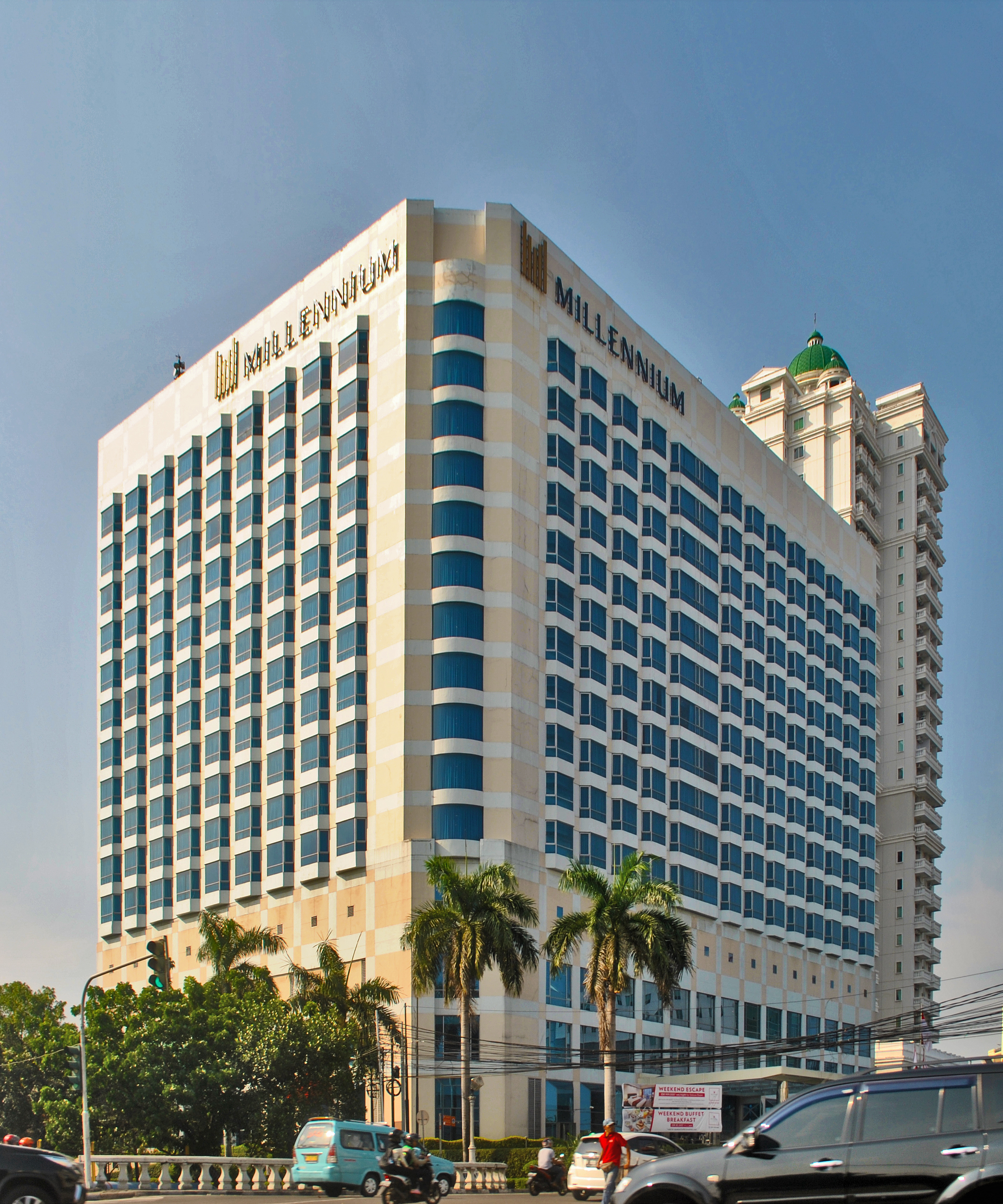
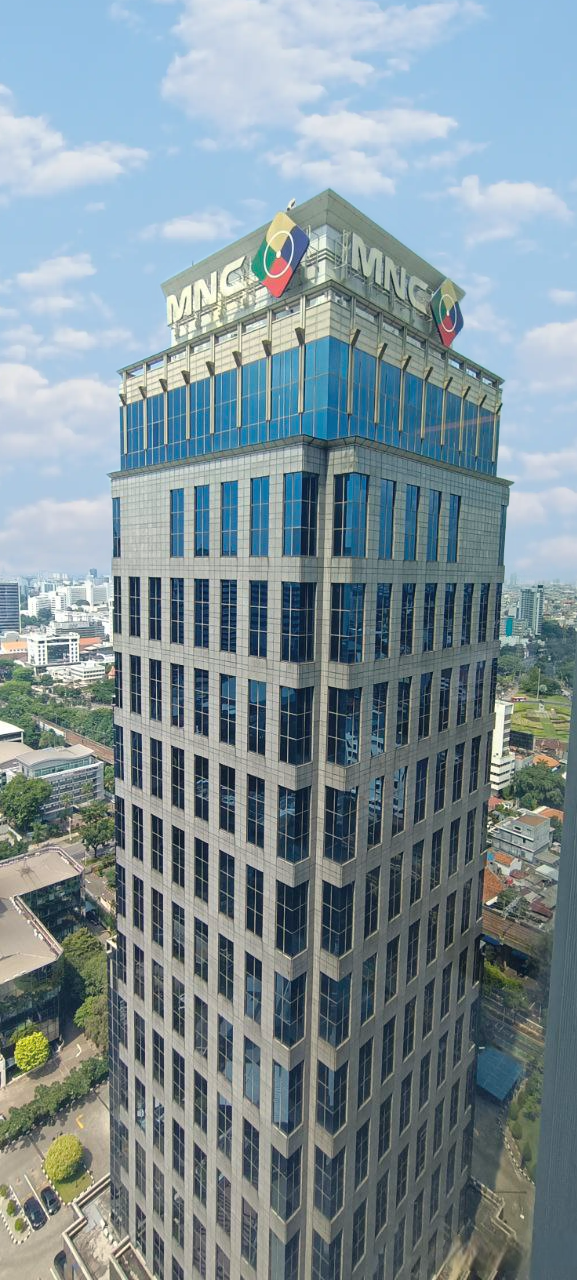
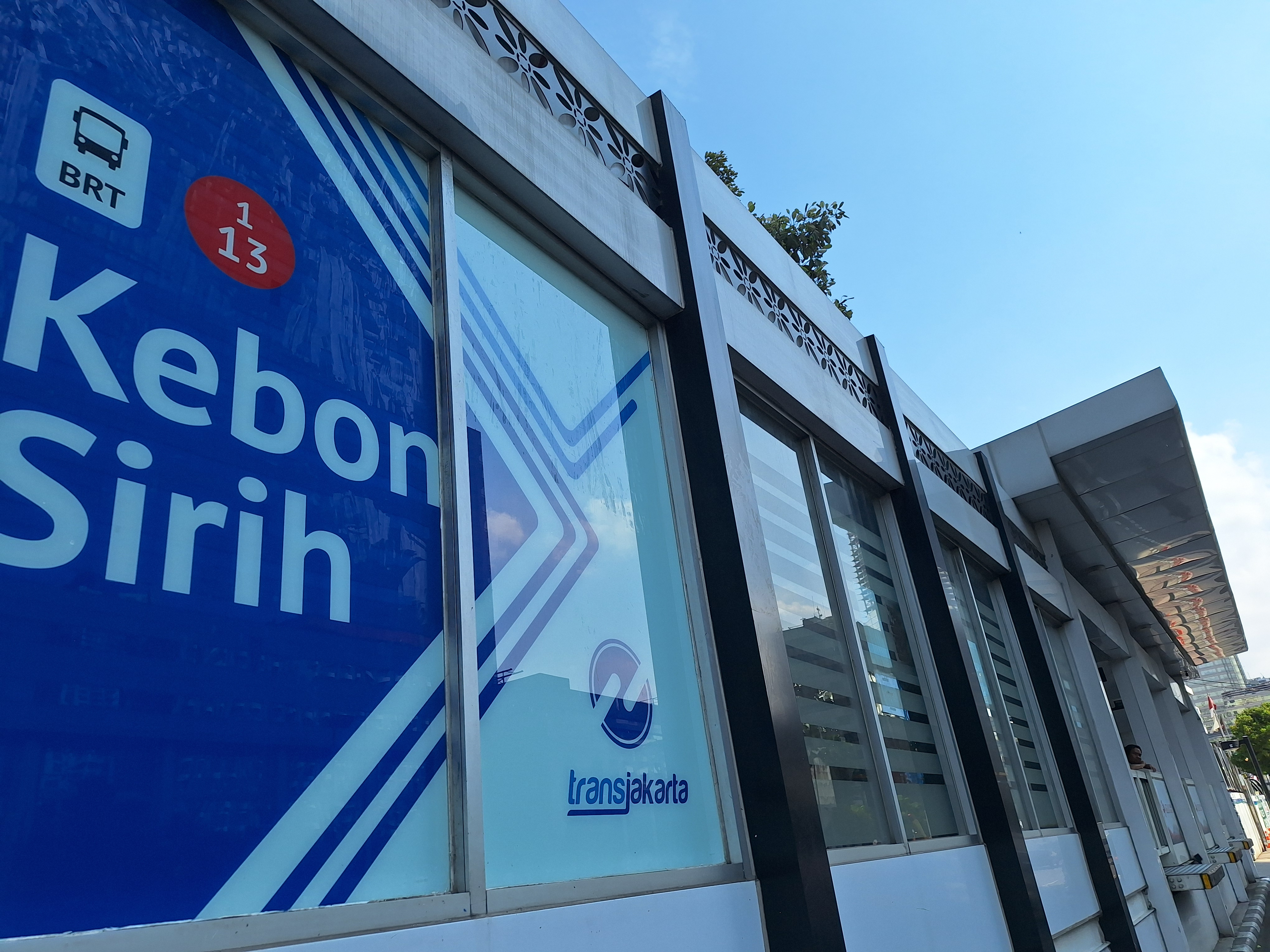
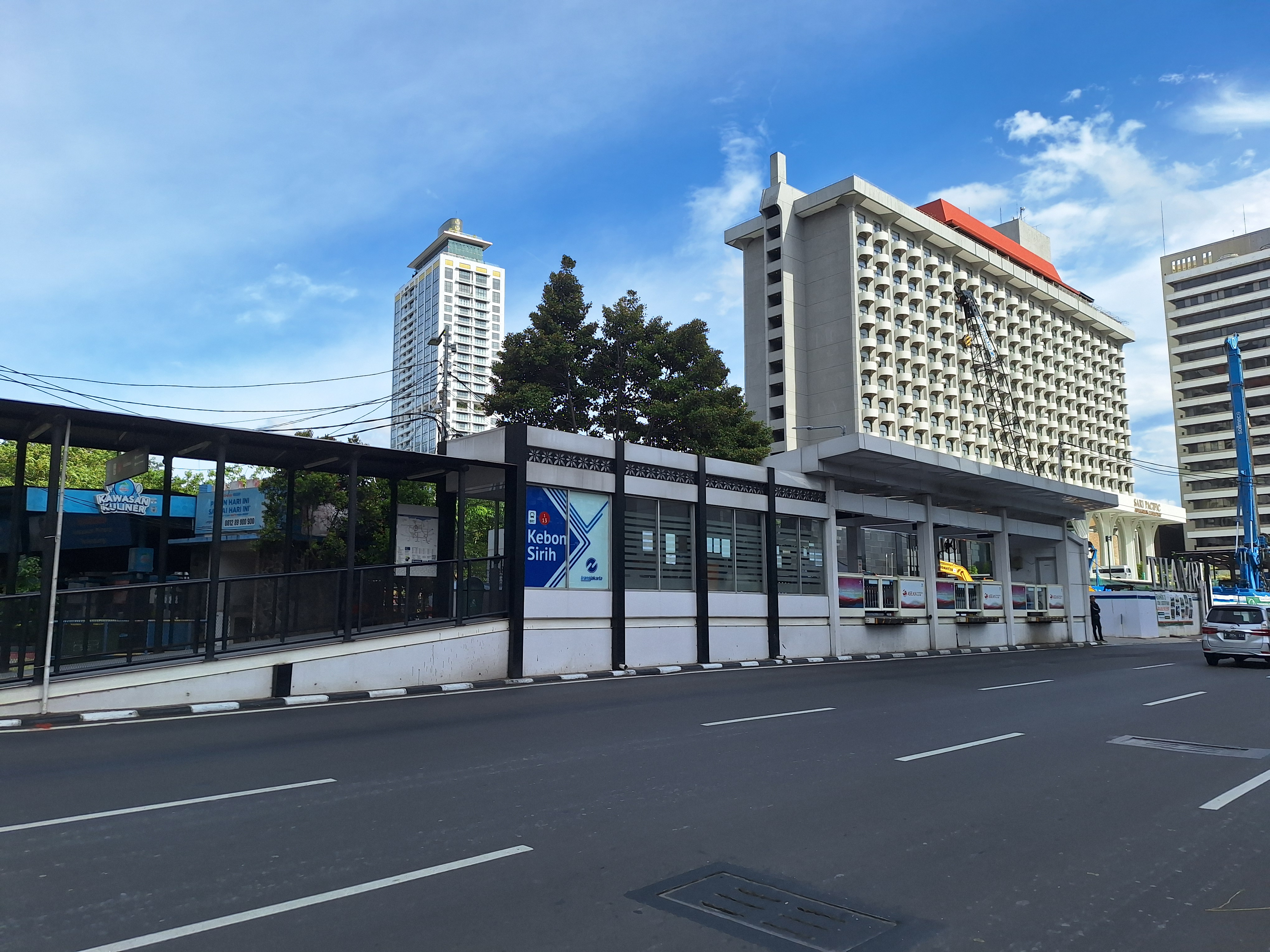
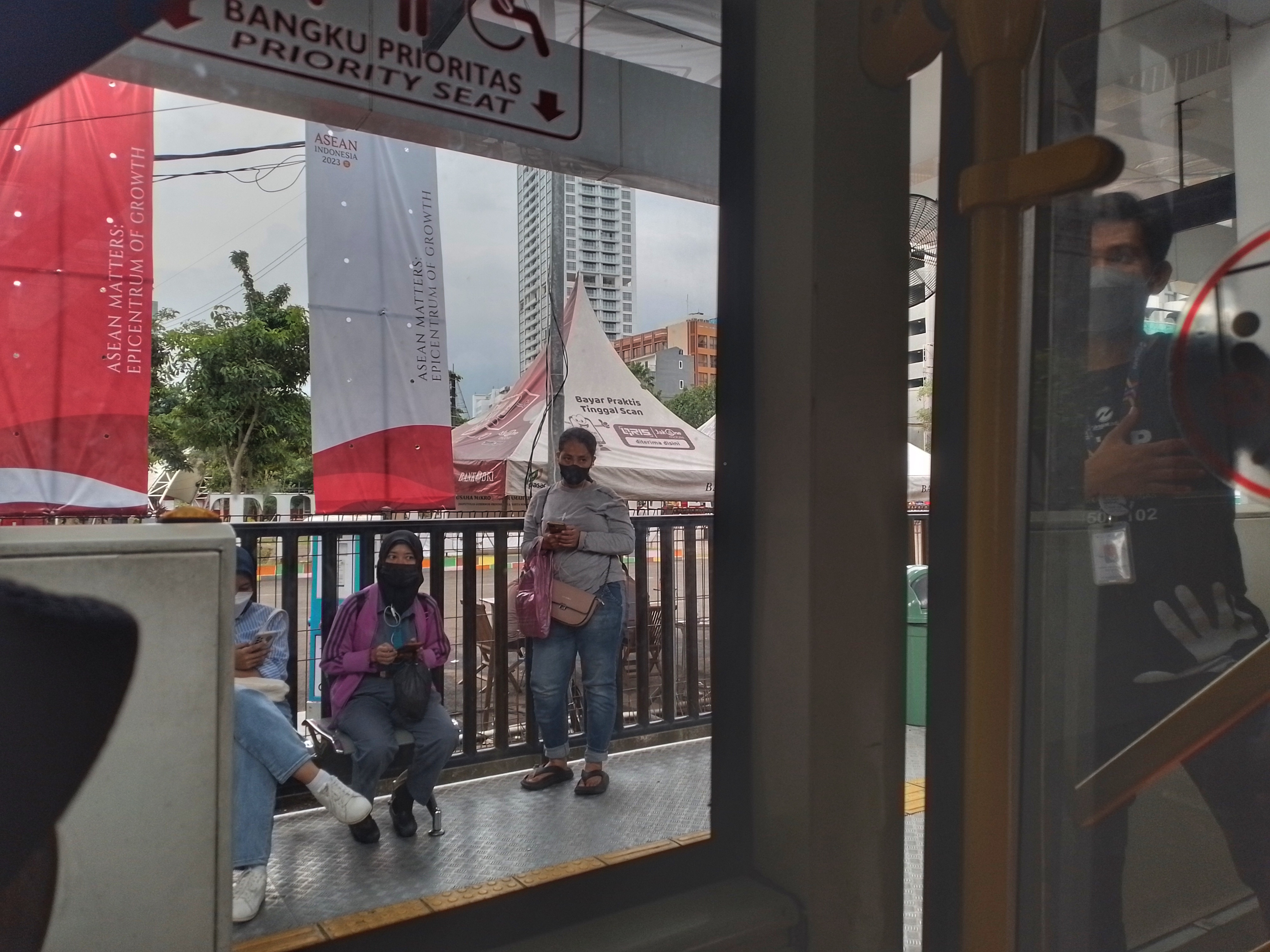
- Interactive map of Kebon Sirih
- Coordinates: 6°11′06″S 106°49′49″E
- Country: Indonesia
- Province: DKI Jakarta
- Administrative city: Central Jakarta
- District: Menteng

Population
  - Total: 11,614
- Postal code: 10340

Kebon Sirih is the northernmost administrative village of Menteng district of Jakarta. It has a postal code of 10340. Kebon Sirih is located to the south of Monas - a historic administrative center of Jakarta - and to the north of Menteng Residential Area - a heritage garden city. The boundary is Jalan KH Wahid Hasyim-Jalan Johar, Jalan Pengarengan to the south, Ciliwung River to the east, Jalan Kebon Sirih to the north, and Jalan Kampung Bali I. 33-Terusan Kebon Sirih 14 to the west.

Despite its close location to the center of Jakarta, which also the center of administrative government of the Dutch Indies, the layout of the area was not as organized as the rest of Menteng Subdistrict because of the existing kampung settlements. The characteristic of the area was organic and not planned, with the exception of the eastern portion of the area close to Gondangdia Station. Many colonial buildings, old houses, and landmarks are located in Kebon Sirih, some of which are Cut Meutia Mosque (a former real estate office), Gedung Joang '45, and Tugu Tani. Other important places are Jakarta Canisius College (a 1920s former Jesuit school) and Jakarta Theater.

The area is served by Gondangdia Station. Being strategically located, many modern hotels and retails are built in Kebon Sirih, especially in Jalan KH Wahid Hasyim and Jalan Jaksa.

The area aired television when in the 24th of August, 1989, RCTI built a skyscraper for airing RCTI all across Indonesia, headquarters, and so much more. In the 12th of September, 2002, RCTI transformed the skyscraper to the MNC Tower that not only aired RCTI, but also TVG, and TPI (Televisi Paling Indonesia). This is the beginning of Media Nusantara Citra, Indonesia's first television media.

== See also ==
- Menteng
- List of administrative villages of Jakarta
