= Sasmita Loka Ahmad Yani Museum =

Coordinates: 6°12′16.51″S 106°50′11.64″E

Museum Sasmita Loka Ahmad Yani
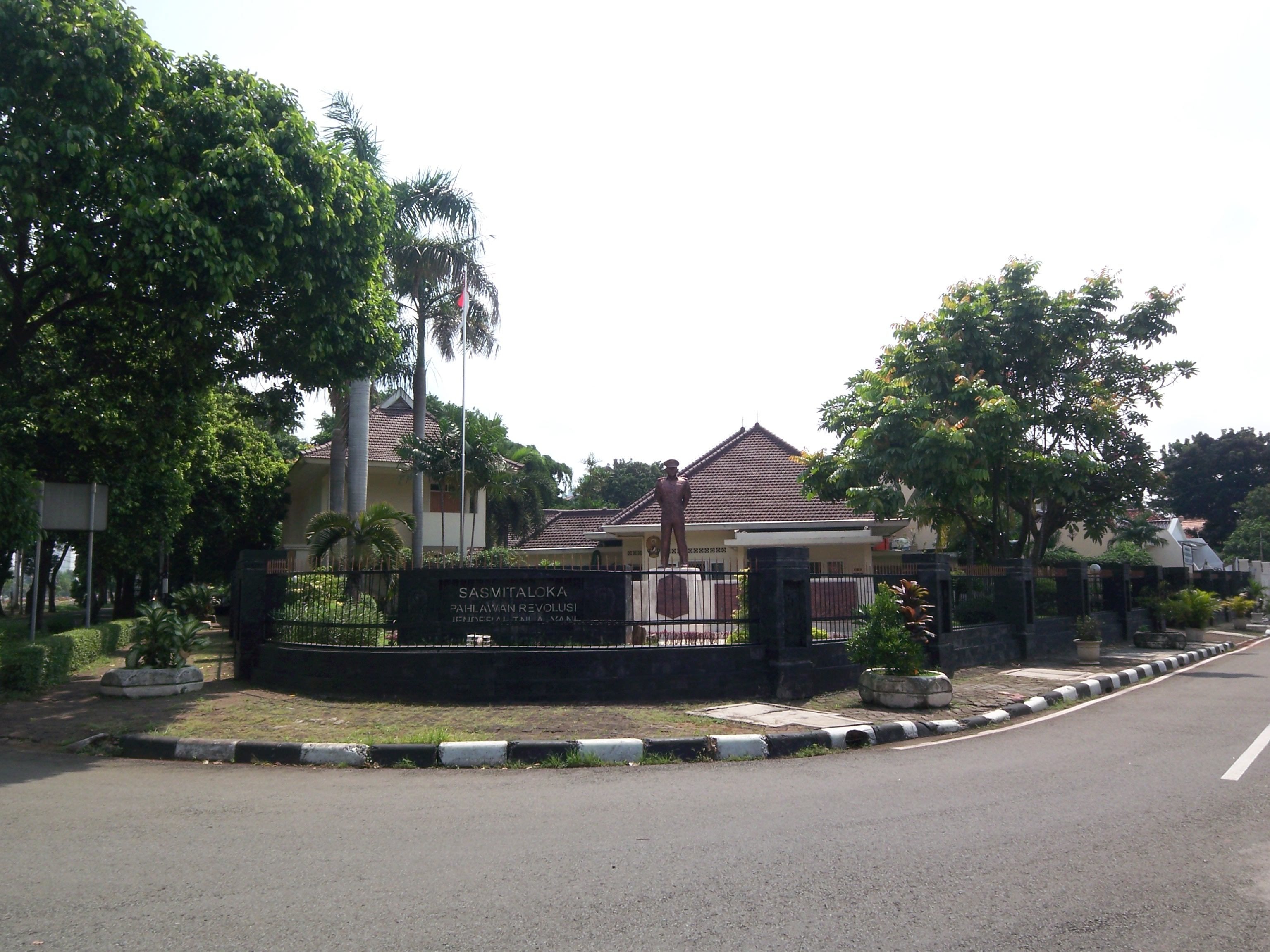
- The front view of Museum.
- Location: Jl. Lembang 58, Menteng, Central Jakarta, Indonesia
- Type: Indonesian National Hero Museum

The Sasmita Loka Ahmad Yani Museum houses a collection from Ahmad Yani and some dioramas about the G-30-S/PKI, 30 September 1965. The museum is located in jalan Lembang 58 or jalan Laturharhari 65, Central Jakarta, Indonesia. The museum is open free to public from Tuesday until Sunday, from 08:00 WIB until 14:00 WIB.

== History ==
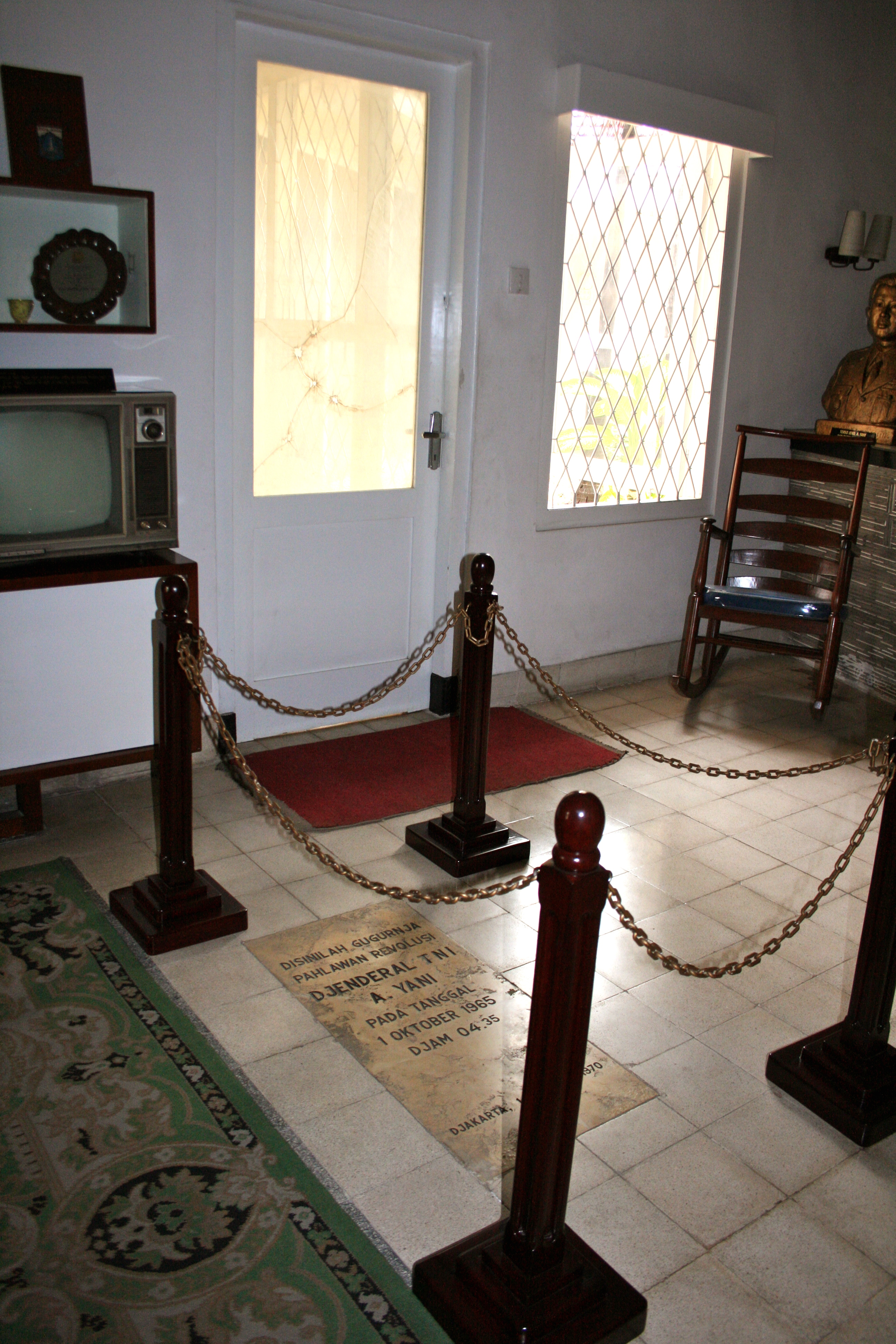
A plaque marking the place where Ahmad Yani was shot in 1965

The museum was originally used as a residence for Dutch or European director of a private company. During the 1950s, the house was managed by the housing for military office. Later the house was resided by General Ahmad Yani. This was the place where Ahmad Yani was shot members of the 30 September Movement. The rest of the family moved out of the house after Yani's death. Mrs Yani helped make their former home into a public Museum in October 1965, the interior is kept as it is, including bullet holes in the door and walls where Ahmad Yani was murdered, and the home's furnishings of the time.

== See also ==
- List of museums in Jakarta
