= Jakarta City Hall =

Seat of the Indonesian capital city government

- Balai Kota DKI Jakarta

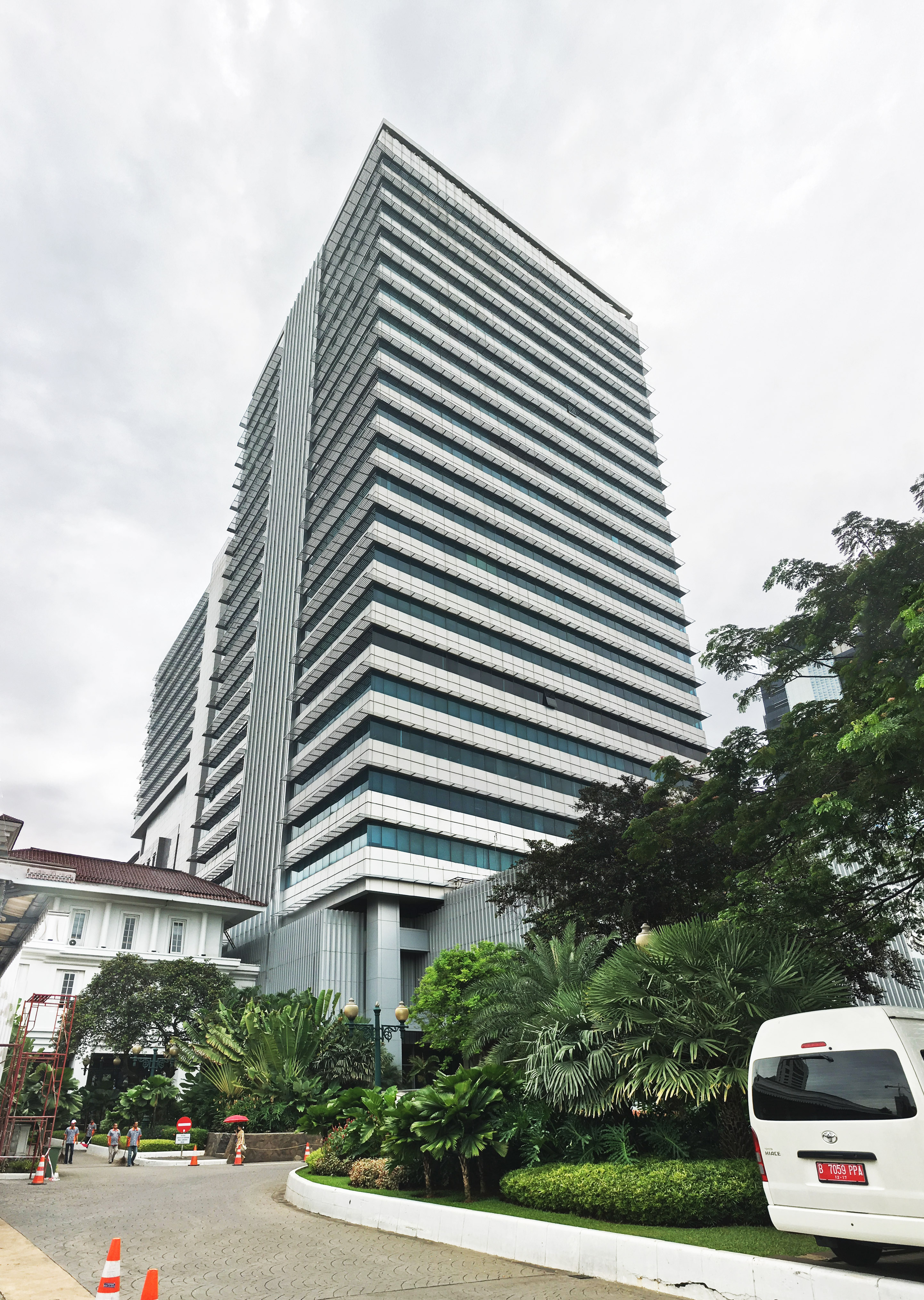
- The refurbished 24-floor Building G, the main administrative office of the Jakarta City Hall complex.

- Location within Jakarta

General information
- Type: City hall
- Architectural style: Building in various styles: Indies Empire style, International Style
- Location: Jakarta, Indonesia, Jl. Medan Merdeka Selatan No. 8-9, Jakarta 10110
- Coordinates: 6.1814046°S 106.8284090°E
- Owner: Jakarta Special Capital Region Government (Pemda DKI Jakarta)

Website
- www.jakarta.go.id

Jakarta City Hall (Indonesian: Balai Kota DKI Jakarta) is the seat of government of the Special Capital Region of Jakarta. The complex contains the official office of the governor and the vice governor, as well as the main administrative office. Jakarta City Hall is located south of Merdeka Square.

== Building complex ==
=== Jakarta Governor's office ===
The building is the office of the governor of Jakarta. Built in the early 19th-century, it is the oldest building in the Jakarta City Hall complex. It was originally used as the office and residence of the Resident of West Java. The Jakarta Governor's office is a typical Indies Empire style structure, with symmetrical classical proportions and rows of Tuscan-order columns at its front elevation.

=== Building G ===
Constructed in 1972 as a model for ideal skyscrapers in Jakarta.

== History ==
=== Dutch colonial period ===
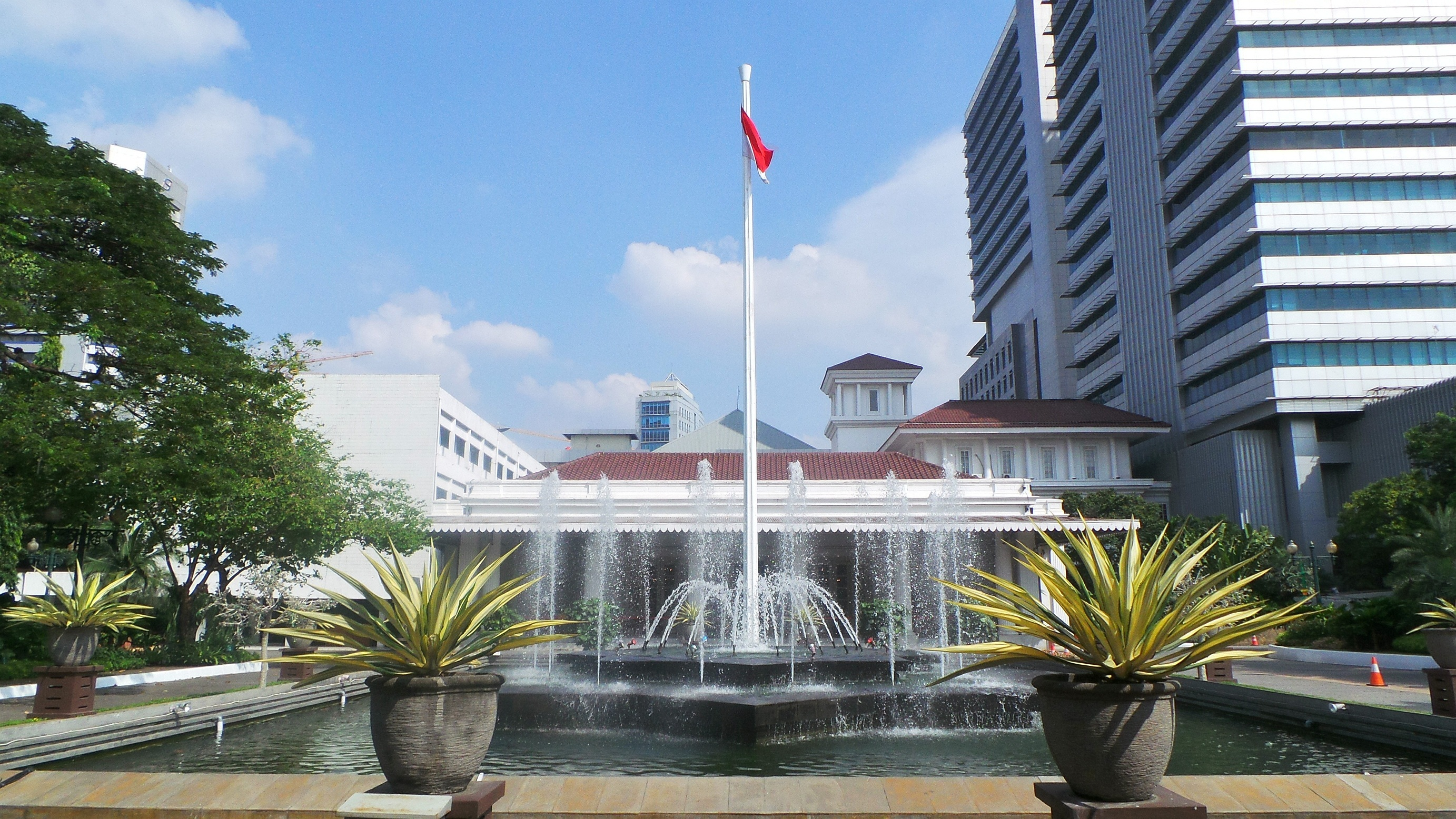
The 19th-century Jakarta Governor's office within the complex of Jakarta City Hall was originally used as the office and residence of the Resident of West Java.

The first city hall of Jakarta was built on 4 March 1621, as the city of Batavia was developing. This city hall, which has been converted into the Jakarta History Museum, was the original administrative center of Batavia.

On 1 April 1905, the Gemeente Batavia (Batavia City Council) was formed to allow greater autonomy in the management of the colonial capital. Initially, the council still operated from the old city hall in the Old Town. The growth of Batavia to the southern area of Weltevreden forced many government buildings to relocate their address to the south, including the city hall. In 1913, the council was relocated to Tanah Abang West (now Jalan Abdul Muis no. 35). In 1919, the council was relocated again to the current building in Koningsplein Zuid (now Jalan Medan Merdeka Selatan no. 8-9). At that time, building no. 8 was used for the office and residence of the Resident of West Java, while building no. 9 was the Gemeentehuis Batavia and the official residence of the Burgemeester. Building no. 9 was fully converted into a city hall when the official residence of the Burgemeester was moved to a new building near the Bisschopplein (now Taman Suropati), located in Jalan Suropati 7.

On 1 October 1926, Gemeentehuis Batavia became the Stad Gemeentehuis Batavia.

=== Japanese occupation and National Revolution ===
During World War II, the building was used for the office of the Jakarta Special City (ジャカルタ特別市, Jakaruta tokubetsu-shi). After independence, the name of the building became Balai Agung Pemerintahan Nasional Kota Djakarta (Great Hall of the National Administration of Djakarta City), with Suwiryo as its first native mayor. Since then, Jakarta's administration has continued to be based in the same building.

On 21 July 1947, the new administration of Jakarta was unable to operate when Suwiryo and the new government of Jakarta were driven out of office by the Dutch government, who at that time had not recognized the independence declaration on 17 August 1945. On 9 March 1948, the Dutch government formed a pre-federal governorship to replace the former government, and converted Jakarta into the capital of the country. The name was changed back to Stad Gemeente Djakarta and remained so until the recognition of the independence of Indonesia on 27 December 1949 by the Dutch Empire.

=== Post-national revolution ===
In 31 March 1950, Soewirjo was reappointed as mayor of Kotapradja Djakarta (Jakarta municipality). Around 1954, the city hall was expanded to include building no. 8, hence now Jakarta City Hall occupies two building plots. The office building of the High Commissioner of the Kingdom of the Netherlands, which was located next to Jakarta City Hall, was also used as government offices for the Mutual Assistance Regional Representatives Council (Dewan Perwakilan Rakyat Daerah Gotong Rojong). The office of the High Commissioner of the Kingdom of the Netherlands was then relocated to Jalan Medan Merdeka Barat.

=== Next development ===
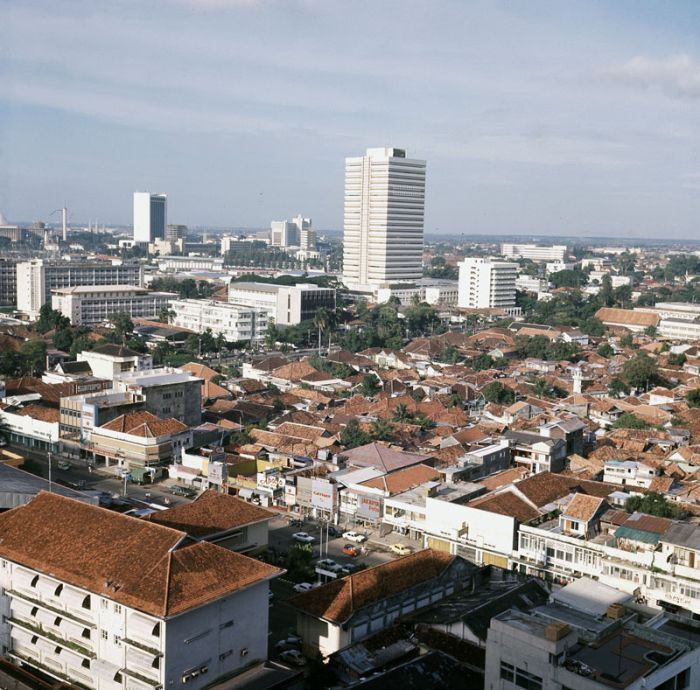
The 24-floor Building G looms in the center of this 1980s photograph. The building was first built in 1972 as a pilot project for other highrise building projects in Jakarta.

From 1960, Jakarta was headed by a governor after its status was upgraded from municipality (kota pradja Djakarta Raja) to province (Daerah Chusus Ibu Kota (DCI) Djakarta). In 1964, Jakarta officially became the capital of Indonesia. The governor remained an appointee of the president until 2007, when the first citywide elections for governors were held together with the usual legislative election.

In 1969, Jakarta City Hall expanded, with construction of Building C (Balai Agung) and the 4-story building F.

In 1972, the government of DCI Djakarta changed its name to Daerah Khusus Ibu Kota (DKI) Jakarta following the implementation of the Enhanced Indonesian Spelling System. In the same year, the old colonial building located on plot 9 was demolished to make way for the 24-story Building G. Construction of this building was meant to be a pilot project for other highrises in Jakarta and a reference to lay out new regulations on highrises in the city. In the same year, the complex of the City Hall was expanded toward Jalan Kebon Sirih, with the construction of building H. Afterwards, new buildings were established in the complex, which now includes Building D and Building F. In 1982, the DPRD DKI building was constructed on Jalan Kebon Sirih.

== Present ==
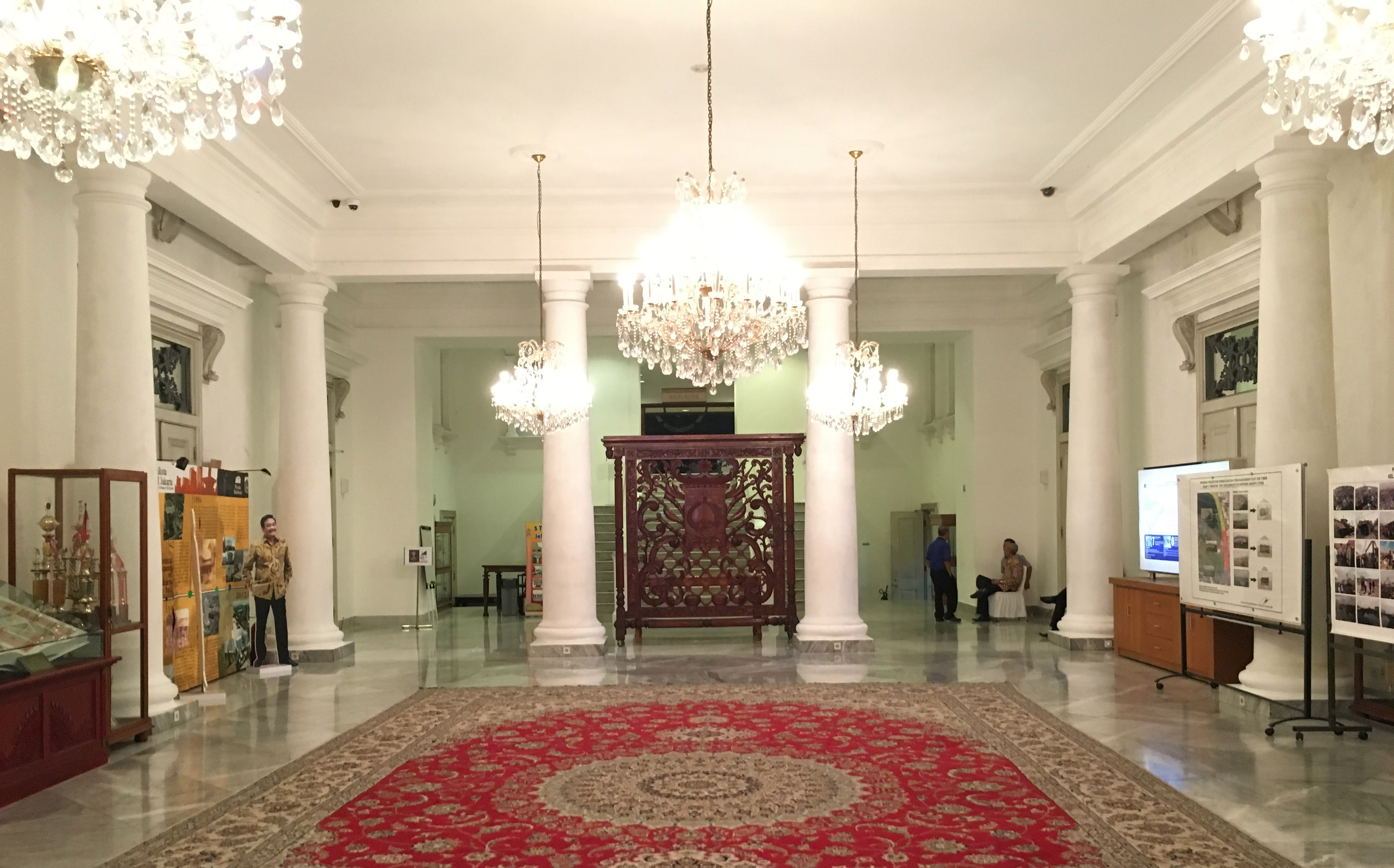
The interior of the City Hall building at number 8, the governor's office, was opened to the public during the tenure of Governor Basuki Tjahaja Purnama, and again during the tenure of incumbent governor Pramono Anung

During the tenure of Governor Basuki Tjahaja Purnama, the colonial City Hall building at number 8 was opened to the public on 12 September 2015. Visitors can also see a variety of Indonesian films screened every weekend at the Great Hall Building. The public tour was revived in 2026 by incumbent governor Pramono Anung.

== See also ==
- List of colonial buildings and structures in Jakarta
- Indies Empire style

== Cited works ==
- Merrillees, Scott (2015). Jakarta: Portraits of a Capital 1950-1980. Jakarta: Equinox Publishing. ISBN 9786028397308.
- Schoppert, Peter (2012). Java Style. Editions Didier Millet. ISBN 9789814260602.
- "Gedung Balaikota" [City Hall] (in Indonesian). Jakarta City Administration. Archived from the original on 7 November 2016.
- "Balai Kota, Gedung" [City Hall] (in Indonesian). Jakarta City Administration. Archived from the original on 7 November 2016.
