= Gondangdia railway station =

Railway station in Indonesia

B07 Gondangdia Station Stasiun Gondangdia
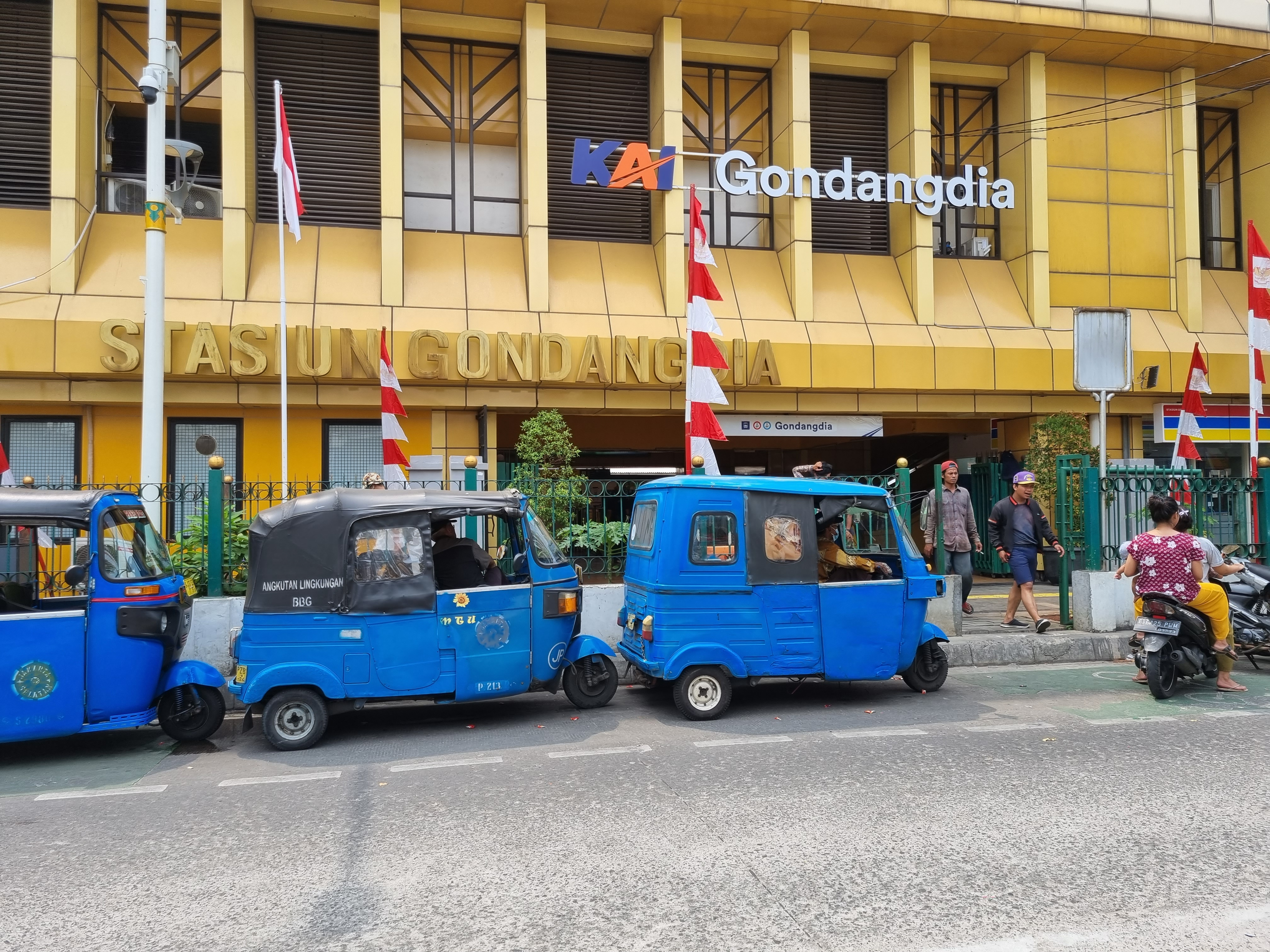
- Gondangdia Station in 2022

General information
- Location: Jl. Srikaya No.1 Gondangdia, Menteng, Central Jakarta; Jakarta; Indonesia
- Coordinates: 6°11′8″S 106°49′56″E
- Elevation: +17 m (56 ft)
- Owner: Kereta Api Indonesia
- Operator: KAI Commuter
- Line: Bogor Line
- Platforms: 2 side platforms
- Tracks: 2

Construction
- Structure type: Elevated
- Accessible: Available

Other information
- Station code: GDD

History
- Opened: 1872
- Rebuilt: 1992

Services
Preceding station		Following station
Juanda towards Jakarta Kota	Bogor Commuter Line	Cikini towards Bogor or Nambo
Location
- Location within Jakarta

Gondangdia Station (GDD) (Indonesian: Stasiun Gondangdia) is a railway station serving by Jakarta Commuterline at Gondangdia, Menteng, Central Jakarta, Indonesia.

The station is strategically located near office areas. The lower floor of the station complex once housed stalls occupied by traders who paid rent to PT Kereta Api (PT KAI), but these commercial spaces have since been demolished. The head office of PT Kereta Api Logistik (Kalog) is also located at this station. The area around the station is being renovated to strengthen public transportation integration (with TransJakarta), rearrange the street vendors around the station, and make it easier for pedestrians to access. Estimated to be completed in 2021, this arrangement is being carried out by PT Moda Integrasi Transportasi Jakarta, a joint venture between the Jakarta MRT and PT KAI.

== History ==
Gondangdia Station was originally a small railway stop that was built as a replacement for the Dierentuin railway stop. At that time, the Batavia City Council considered the location of the Dierentuin Stop to be bizarre and impractical for the development of the Gondangdia and Menteng areas. The Batavia City Council ordered the Staatsspoorwegen (SS) to build a new railway stop as a replacement for the Dierentuin Stop. SS built 2 small railway stops located in Gondangdia and Menteng respectively. This railway stop was inaugurated in 1926 and is strategically located because it is next to the N.V. de Bouwploeg.

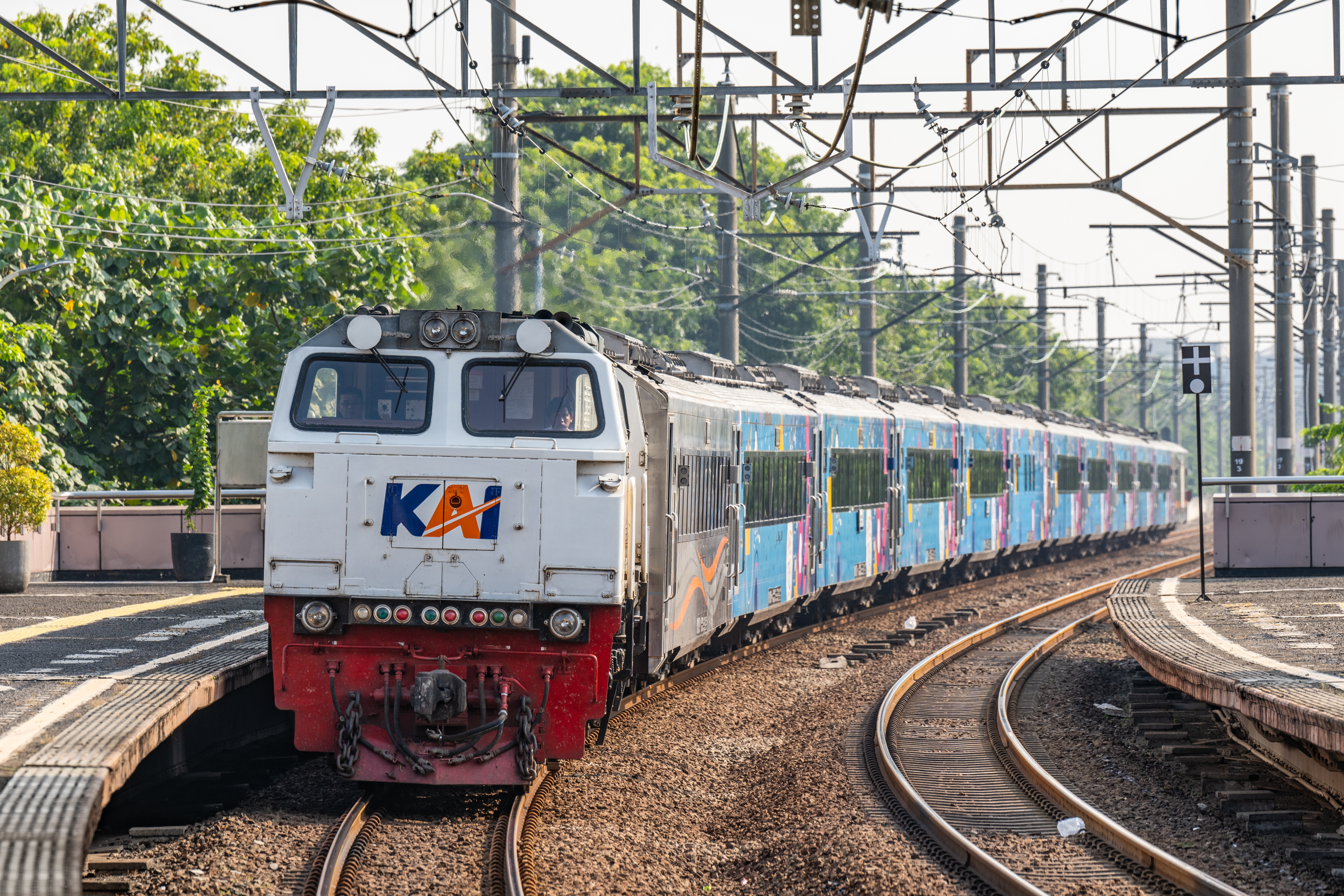
A CC206 used by the Taksaka train entering the station in 2023

The active Gondangdia Station is now an elevated station on the Jakarta Kota–Manggarai elevated railway. On 5 June 1992, President Soeharto along with Mrs. Tien Soeharto and the ranks in the government inaugurated the elevated railway by taking the KRL from Gambir to Jakarta Kota Station.

== Building and layout ==
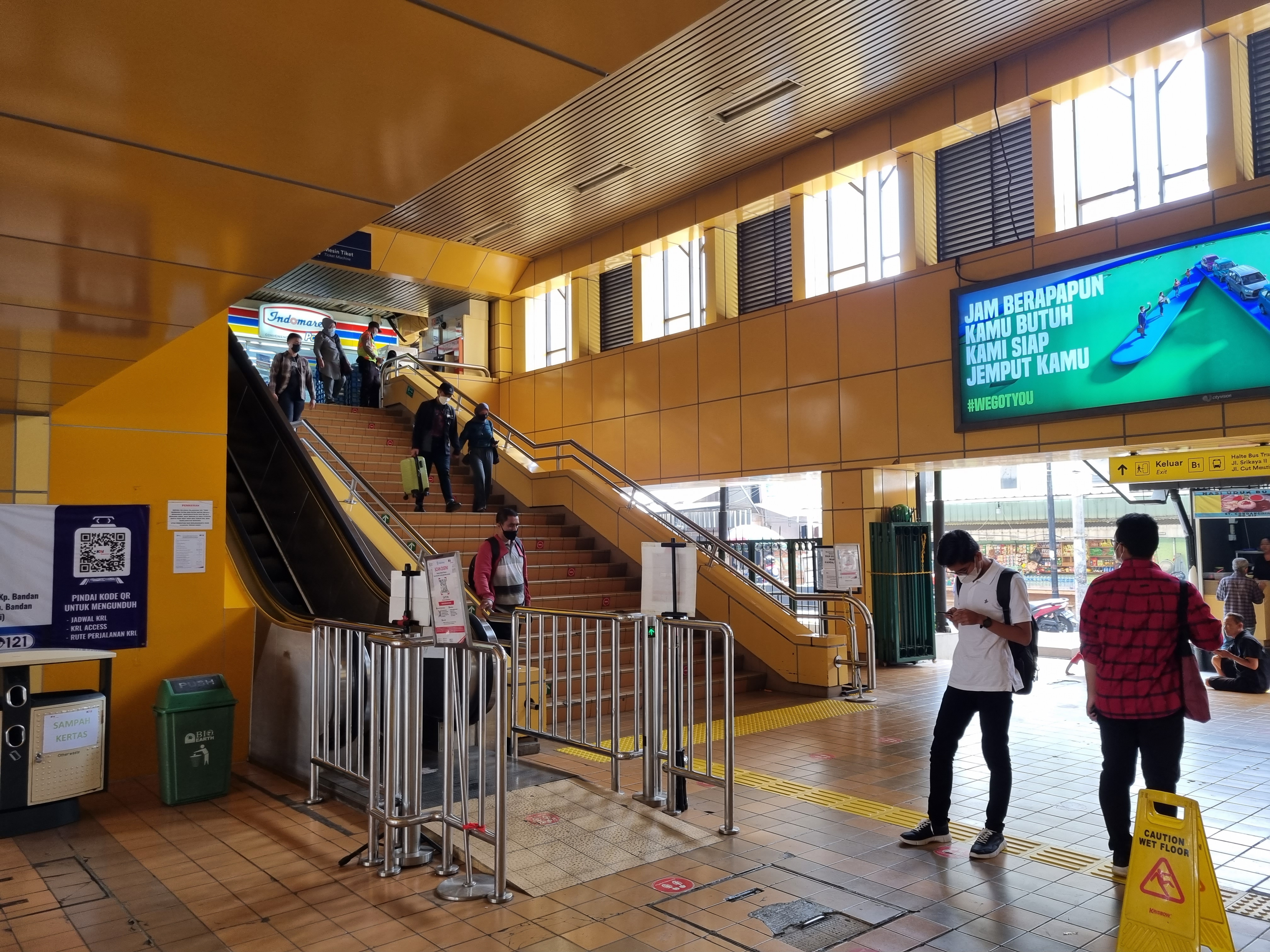
The interior of the station in 2022

Like other Manggarai–Jakarta Kota elevated stations, work on the station was done by Inti Era Cipta, a consortium formed by Encona Engineering, Wiratman, PT Chandra Wahana Raya and PT Asianenco. The project also involved 3 Japanese firms: Pacific Consultant International, Japan Transportation Consultants, and Japan Electrical Consulting.

Manggarai–Jakarta Kota elevated stations were designed in a post-modernist style, incorporating hi-tech aesthetics with local traditional architecture. Stations were designed with bright colors to serve as local landmarks for the area and for easy recognition. Juanda station has an jenar yellow eromel metal sheet finish to prevent the building from vandalism and fires.

Originally, the first floor of the station was open-air, before being closed off for more retail space. The project, which began in February 1988 and was completed by 1992, cost 432.5 billion rupiah. It was not completed by its inauguration date, but was fully operational a year after.

This station has two railway tracks:

Platform floor	Side platform, the doors are opened on the right side	
Platform floor	Line 1	← Bogor Line to Jakarta Kota
Platform floor	Line 2	Bogor Line to Bogor or Nambo (Cikini) →
Platform floor	Side platform, the doors are opened on the right side	

== Services ==
The following is a list of train services at the Gondangdia Station.

=== Passenger services ===
- KAI Commuter
  - Bogor Line, to Jakarta Kota and Bogor
  - Bogor Line (Nambo branch), to Jakarta Kota and Nambo

== Supporting transportation ==
Type	Route	Destination
TransJakarta city bus	1H (MetroTrans)	Gondangdia Station–Tanah Abang Station
TransJakarta city bus	2P (non-BRT)	Gondangdia Station–Pasar Senen
TransJakarta city bus	2Q (non-BRT)	Gondangdia Station–Jakarta City Hall
TransJakarta city bus	6H (non-BRT)	Lebak Bulus–Pasar Senen
Mikrotrans Jak Lingko	JAK-10A	Gondangdia Station–Cikini Station (via Salemba Raya)
Mikrotrans Jak Lingko	JAK-10B	Gondangdia Station–Cikini Station (via Kramat Raya)

== See also ==
- Rail transport in Indonesia
