= Cut Meutia Mosque =

Mosque in Jakarta, Indonesia

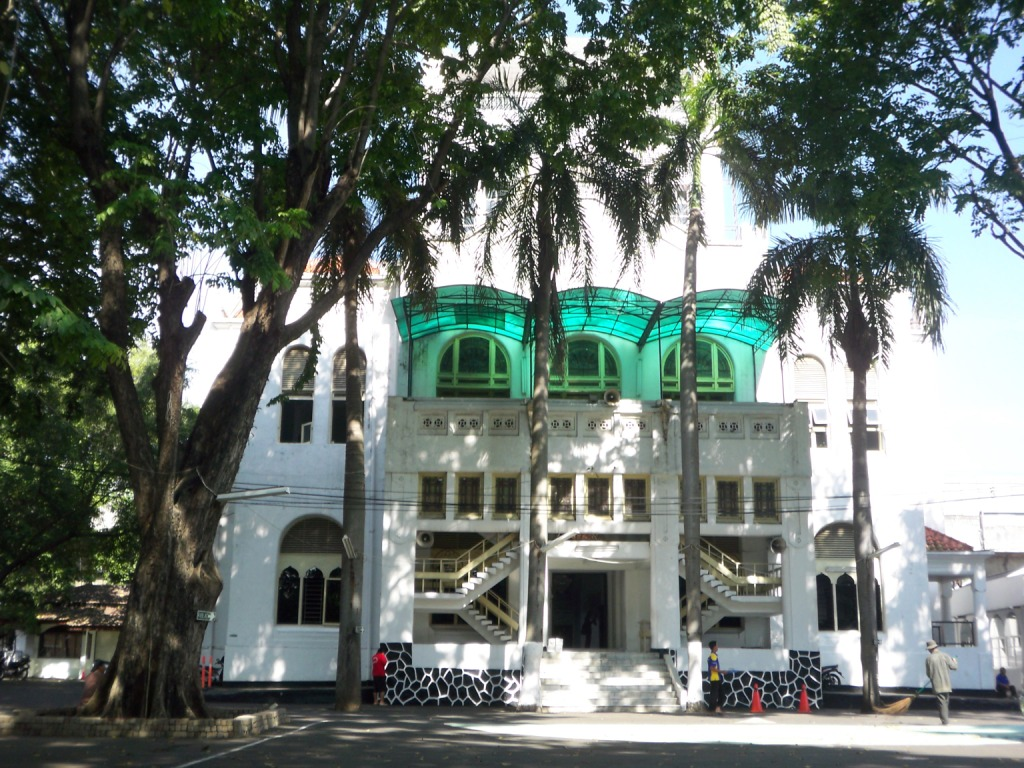

Religion
- Affiliation: Islam
- Branch/tradition: Sunni
- Ownership: Cut Meutia Mosque Foundation Jakarta (Yayasan Masjid Cut Meutia Jakarta)

Location
- Location: Jakarta, Indonesia
- Interactive map of Cut Meutia Mosque
- Coordinates: 6.187285°S 106.833358°E

Architecture
- Architect: Pieter Adriaan Jacobus Moojen
- Type: Mosque
- Style: Dutch Rationalism, New Indies Style
- Established: 1922
- Minaret: none

Website
- masjidcutmeutia.com

Cut Meutia Mosque (Indonesian: Masjid Cut Meutia) is a mosque in Jakarta, Indonesia. The mosque is named after an Indonesian national heroine, Cut Nyak Meutia (1870–1910), who took part in the struggle against Dutch colonialism in Aceh. The mosque was originally a Dutch property before it was finally transformed into a mosque.

== History ==
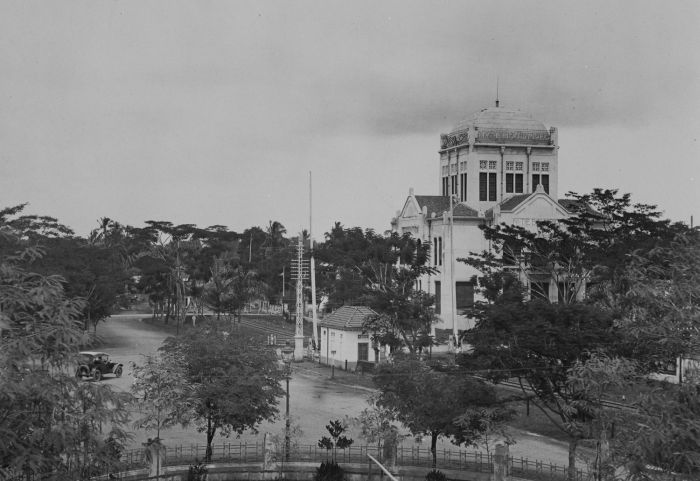
The building N.V. Bouwploeg in the 1920s before its transformation into a mosque.

The building was initiated in 1922 as N.V. (Naamloze vennootschap) Bouwploeg, a Dutch property developer/architecture firm of Pieter Adriaan Jacobus Moojen (1879–1955). The firm planned and developed the nearby residential area of Gondangdia. Afterwards the building was used as the department for drinking water.

During the coming period, the building was used for different functions such as post office and train company office. From 1959 until 1960 the building was used as a mayor office of Central Jakarta. Later the building was used as a drinking water department (Perusahaan Air Minum), Department of Residentials of Jakarta (Kantor Dinas Urusan Perumahan Jakarta), and People Assembly (MPRS). From 1964 to 1970, the building was used as the Office of Home and Religion (1964–1970).

After Ali Sadikin's term as Governor of Jakarta, the building was converted into a provincial mosque on 18 August 1987 under the law SK gubernur no. 5184/1987.

== Design ==
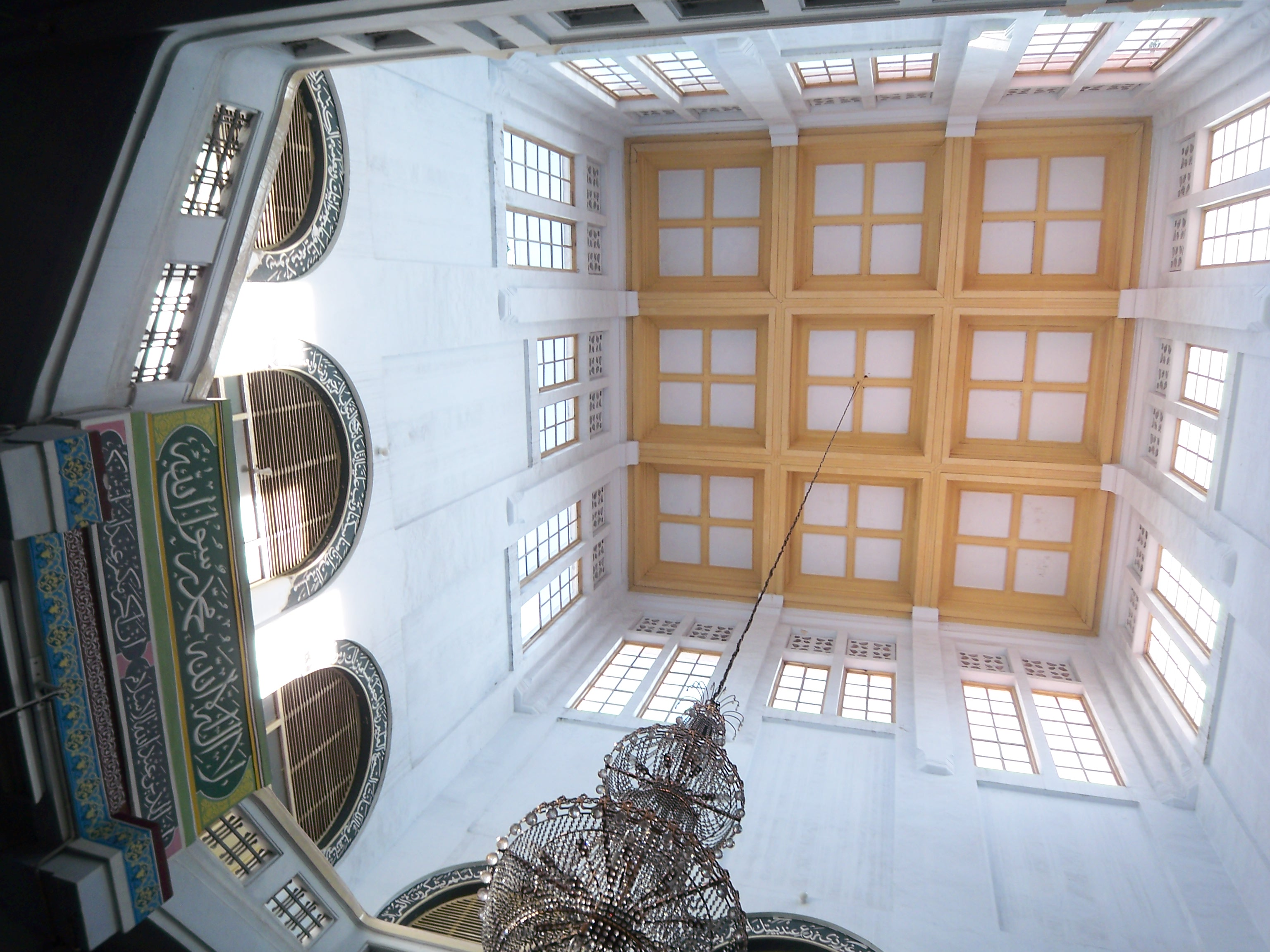
The central ventilation tower of the building, typical feature in Indies Style.

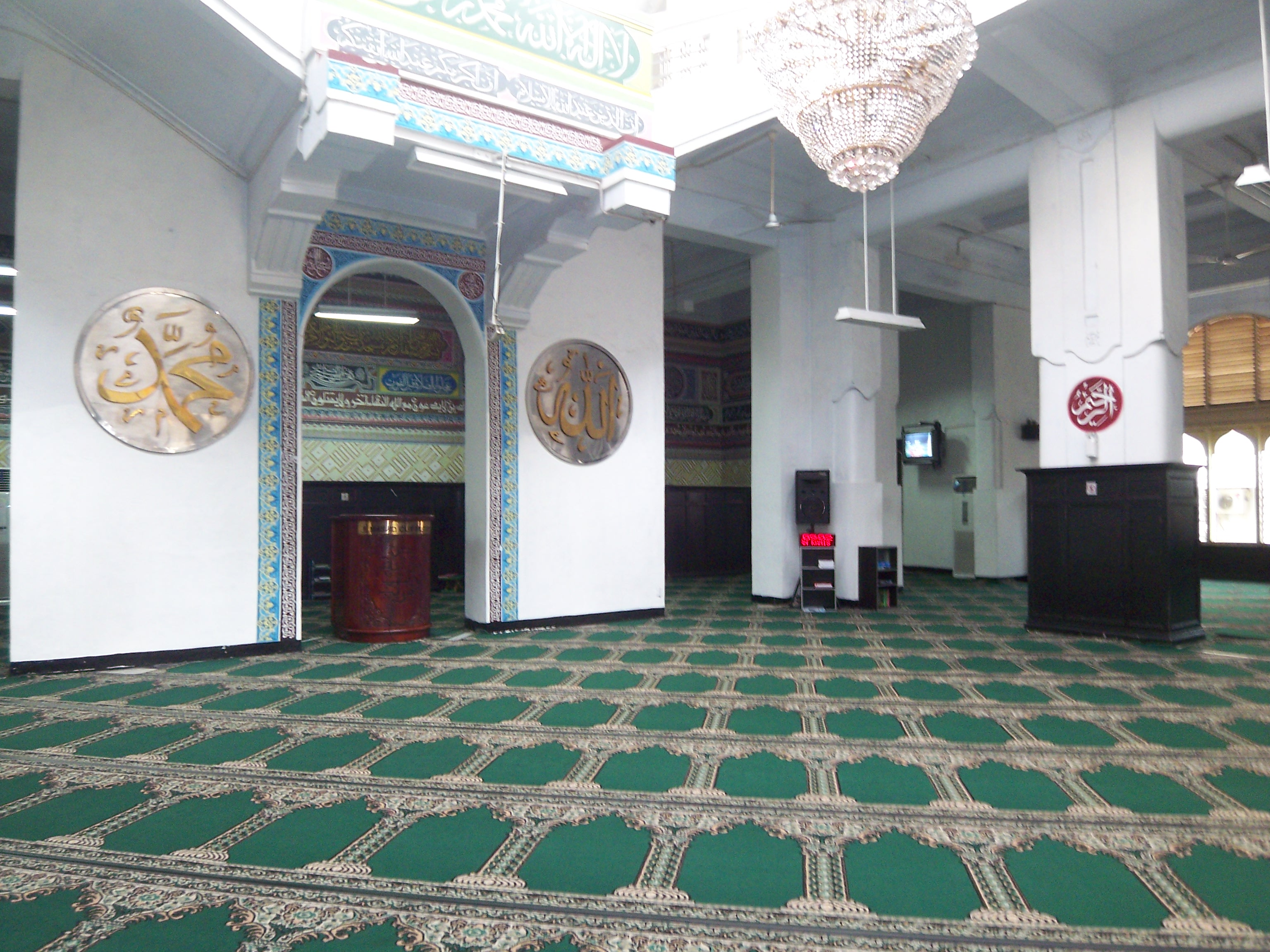
The prayer hall is oriented 45 degree relative to the orientation of the building. As a result, the minbar was positioned in the middle of the prayer hall, not at the qibla wall.

The building was initially built as an architecture office. The architecture of the building follows the Dutch Rationalist style. conformed into the tropics to form a new vernacular style. The building contains a ventilation tower in the center of the building to regulate the temperature inside.

When the building was transformed into a mosque, many aspects of a mosque was fitted in into the office building and as a result the building shows a unique example of how a mosque adapt a layout of an office.

The building does not orient to the qibla (direction to Kaaba). As a result, the direction of the prayer hall is oriented around 45 degree relative to the building's orientation. As a result of this orientation, both the mihrab and the minbar of the mosque are located in the middle of the prayer hall, as opposed to the usual front of the prayer hall.

The central flight of stairs were removed to make way for the prayer hall. To access the second floor, new sets of stairs were created on the front terrace.

== See also ==
- List of mosques in Indonesia
- List of colonial buildings and structures in Jakarta
- Islam in Indonesia
- Indonesian architecture
