= Heroes Monument, Jakarta =

Heroes Monument
- Patung Pahlawan (Indonesian)
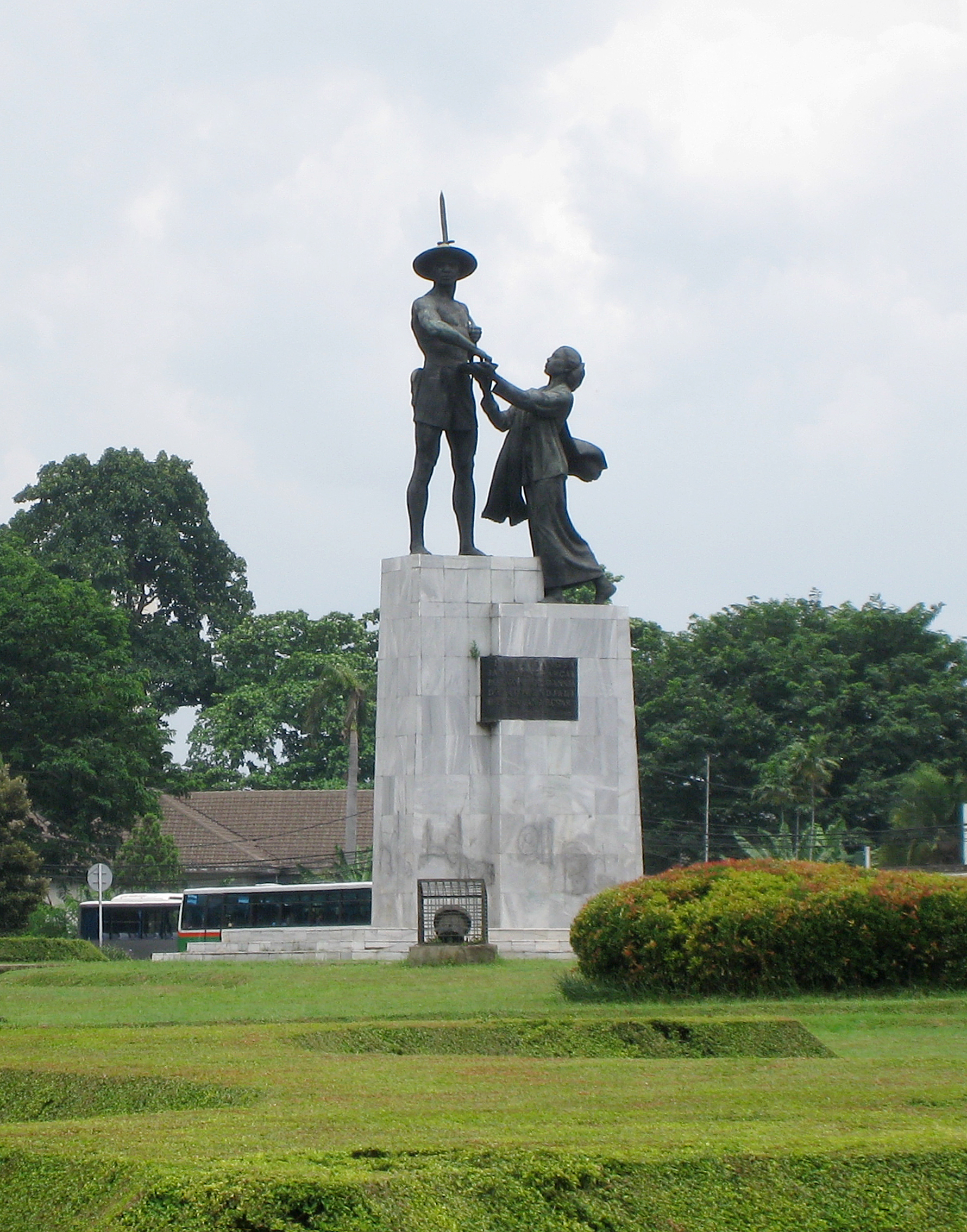
- Interactive map of Heroes Monument
- 6°10′58″S 106°50′05″E
- Location: Jakarta, Indonesia

History
- Built: 1963

Site notes
- Architect(s): Matvey Manizer, Ossip Manizer

The Heroes Monument (Indonesian: Patung Pahlawan), popularly known as Tugu Tani is a bronze statue and important landmark located in Jakarta, Indonesia. The monument celebrates the heroes of the struggles of the Indonesian nation symbolized by a peasant youth wearing a caping with a rifle on his shoulder, a mother behind him offering him a dish of rice. The caping is a traditional farmer's hat in Indonesia, thus the statue is also referred as the Farmer's Monument (Patung Pak Tani or Tugu Tani).

== History and design ==
The idea for the creation of the statue was initiated by Sukarno, the first president of Indonesia, when he visited Moscow in the late 1950s and was impressed with the statues in the city. He was introduced to a Socialist realist sculptor Matvey Manizer and his son Ossip Manizer. In order to inspire them, Sukarno invited the sculptors to Indonesia to build a statue which embodies the fight to achieve independence, which at that time Indonesia was fighting for the freedom of West Irian from the Dutch colonialism. While exploring a rural village in West Java, the sculptors were inspired by a folklore about a mother who supported her son to win the war and to remember his parents and his land as well as giving him some rice for his journey.

The statue was built in the Soviet Union and brought to Indonesia by ship. It was inaugurated in 1963. The statue sits at the junction of Menteng and Prapatan Street, which had been an important place during the days of the August 1945 revolution. The statue has been controversial since armed peasants are sometimes identified with communism.

There is a caption on the pedestal, a sentence by Sukarno:

"HANJA BANGSA JANG MENGHARGAI PAHLAWAN PAHLAWANNJA DAPAT MENDJADI BANGSA JANG BESAR"
(English: "ONLY NATION THAT EXALTS ITS HEROES COULD BE A GREAT NATION")

== Accident and Incident ==
On 22 January 2012, a Daihatsu Xenia crashed a bus stop near the monument and killed nine people around the pedestrian path. the suspect Afriyani Susanti was driving home from nearby Hotel Borobudur and presumed to be in a drunken state.

== Cited works ==
- Merrillees, Scott (2015). Jakarta: Portraits of a Capital 1950-1980. Jakarta: Equinox Publishing. ISBN 9786028397308.
- P. Nas (1993). Urban symbolism. Vol. 8 of Studies in human society. BRILL. ISBN 9789004098558.
