= Suropati Park =

Public park in Menteng, Jakarta, Indonesia

Coordinates: 6°11′57″S 106°49′57″E

Taman Suropati
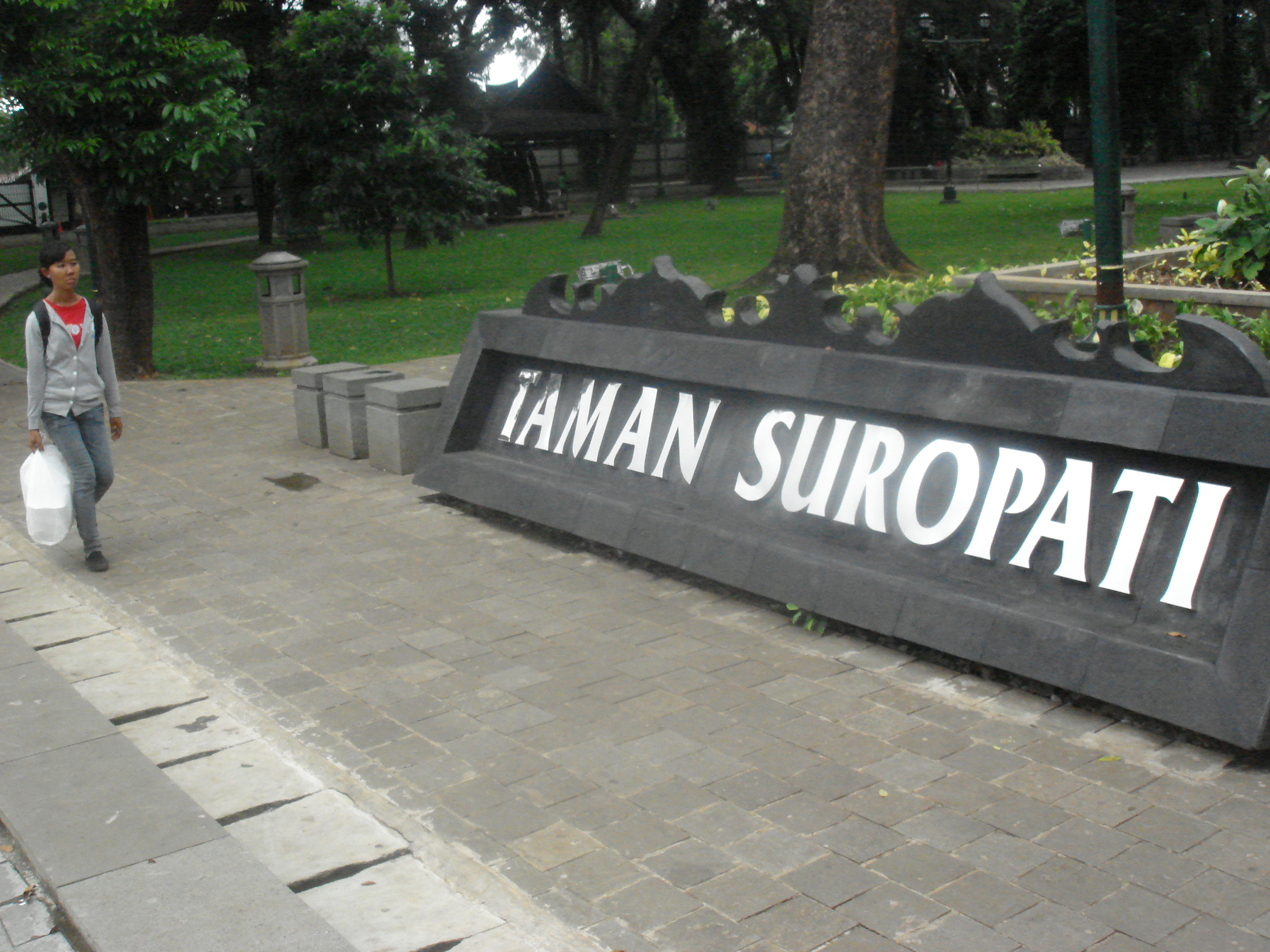
- Suropati in Jakarta, Indonesia

- Location within Jakarta
- Type: Urban park
- Location: Menteng, Jakarta
- Created: 1920
- Owner: Pemprov DKI Jakarta
- Operator: Department of Parks and Cemetery, Jakarta
- Status: Open all year

Taman Suropati or Suropati Park is a public park located in Menteng, Jakarta, Indonesia. The park is located in the center of Menteng and is the meeting point of three streets: Teuku Umar Street, Diponegoro Street, and Imam Bonjol Street.

== History ==
The park, an iconic landmark of Jakarta, was formerly a hill-shaped area. It was built by FJ Kubatz and FJL Gijshels under the direction of PAJ van Moojen, a Dutch architect. The then-mayor of Batavia, GJ Bisschop, who was in office from 1916 to 1920, built the park, which was then named Bisschopplein. The park was officially inaugurated in 1919. The park was built to avoid traffic jams around the court. The soil that was excavated to level the hilly slope dumped to Besuki Street. In 1920, the court started the transformation to be a park by the planting of trees and flowers. Across the park, there was Logegebouw (now Bappenas building).

According to Zaenuddin HM, in his books 212 Asal Usul Djakarta Tempo Doeloe, originally the park was named Burgemeester Bisschopsplein from the first Batavia burgemeester (mayor), G.J. Bisshop. After independence the park was renamed as Taman Suropati, commemorating national hero of Indonesia Untung Suropati.

Taman Suropati in the past was used as a venue for political rallies. According to the Kompas daily newspaper, the Jakarta chapter of mass Muslim organization Nahdlatul Ulama on 21 October 1965 held a public meeting at the park to support an anti-foreign military bases conference called KIAPMA (Konferensi Internasional Anti Pangkalan Asing) and demand the disbanding of the Indonesian Communist Party.

Six monuments representing the Association of Southeast Asian Nations were unveiled at the park on 20 December 1984. The monuments were made by artists from the six ASEAN founding countries: Brunei Darussalam, Thailand, Indonesia, Singapore, the Philippines and Malaysia. Because of this, the park was considered peace or friendship symbol.

== Activities ==
During colonial period and later Taman Suropati, as well as other park, was used by the citizen for jogging and relaxing., which is still continuing. The park is a favorite place for walking, jogging, cycling, sitting and chatting, not only for the residents of the neighborhood but also from other parts of Jakarta. The park provides a natural atmosphere with the presence of fountains and the presence of pigeons. Huge numbers of pigeons reside in the park, which can be fed for recreation. Starting from afternoon throughout the night the park turned into a melting point food and music lovers.

== See also ==
- Menteng

== Works cited ==
- Mulyani, Ade; Dwiharti, Wieke (2011). Jakarta: Panduan Wisata Tanpa Mal (in Indonesian). Gramedia Pustaka Utama. ISBN 9789792258202.
