= Menteng =

- District
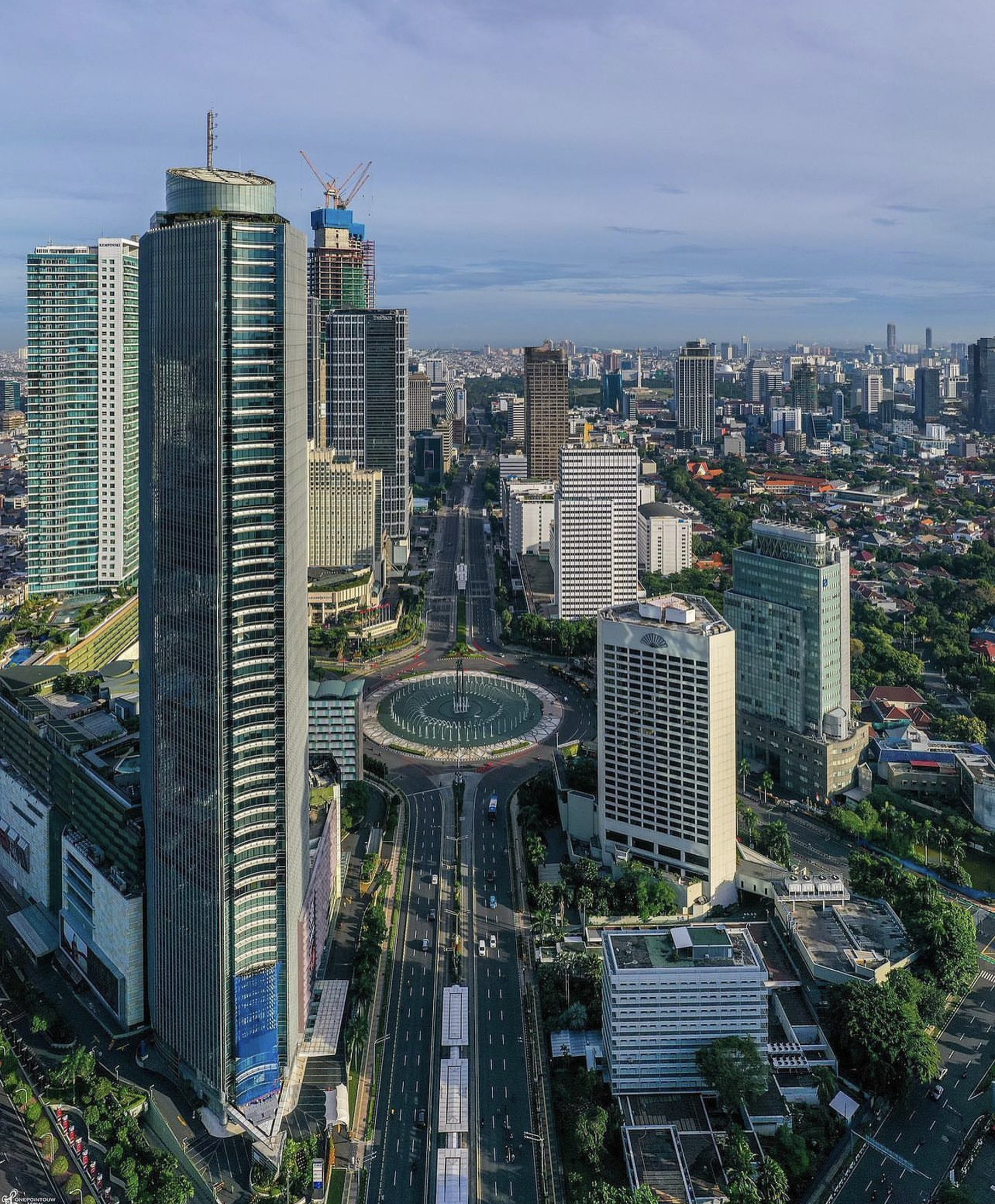
- Bundaran HI, located in the western edge of Menteng.
- Interactive map of Menteng
- Country: Indonesia
- Province: Jakarta
- Administrative city: Central Jakarta
- Postal code: 103XX

Menteng is a district (Indonesian: kecamatan) in the administrative city of Central Jakarta, Indonesia. Menteng is surrounded by the districts of Senen and Matraman to the east, Tebet and Setiabudi to the south, Tanah Abang to the west, and Gambir to the north. Menteng is bound by the West Flood Canal to the west, Ciliwung River to the south and east, and Kebon Sirih Road to the north. Menteng is the district seat of the Central Jakarta government.

Menteng started as a neighbourhood project, characterised by a new urban design developed mainly in the 1910s as a residential area for Dutch Indonesians, the upper middle class, and high officials. At that time it was the first garden suburb in colonial Batavia. Today, the area is considered as one of the most expensive neighbourhoods in Jakarta due to its location being within the Golden Triangle – an agglomeration of Jakarta's three main financial districts. Among former residents are William Soeryadjaya, former presidents Suharto, Megawati Soekarnoputri and former US president Barack Obama – where he spent some of his childhood attending the Besuki Public and Saint Francis of Assisi Schools.

Passenger railways host Gondangdia, Sudirman, and Cikini stations are located within, or on the limits of Menteng. Thamrin Road is a major transportation artery in the district, with numerous offices, embassies, shopping centres, and residential apartments. Menteng Park is also located nearby.

== Districts ==
The district of Menteng is divided into five kelurahan or subdistricts:

Name	Area code	Notes
Menteng	10310	Has southern part of the Menteng Project.
Pegangsaan	10320	Location where the Proclamation of Indonesian Independence was read
Cikini	10330	
Kebon Sirih	10340	
Gondangdia	10350	Has northern zone of the Menteng Project.

== Menteng residential area ==
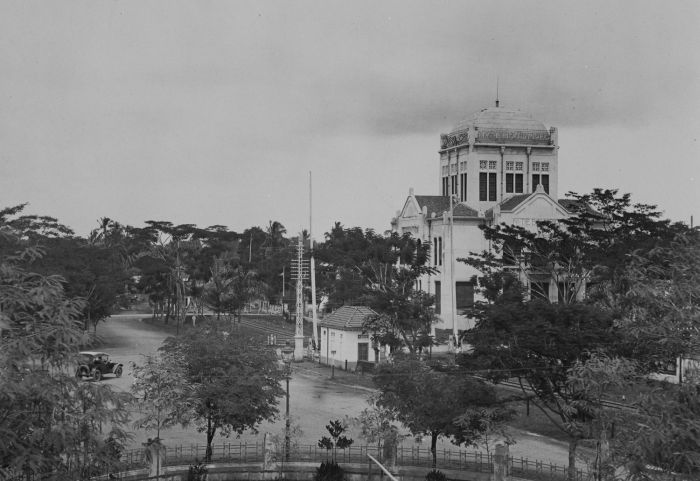
The office building of N.V. de Bouwploeg, now the Cut Meutia Mosque

The Menteng residential area is located in the Menteng district. The residential area spreads over the administrative villages of Menteng and Gondangdia. Menteng residential area was the first modern housing estate in Jakarta. It was developed by the private real estate company N.V. de Bouwploeg, established by P.A.J. Moojen who had been active in Batavia since 1930. The plan of Menteng residential area was designed by Moojen and F.J. Kubatz during the course of the 1910s. Moojen was also a member of a development group established by Batavia city government, the Commisie van toesicht op het Geheer van het Land Menteng, which was responsible for planning and developing the larger area of Gondangdia (Nieuw Gondangdia) of which Menteng was the centerpiece.

The Menteng Project was the most ambitious residential planning project between 1910 and 1939. The project was meant to be the southern expansion of the city Batavia. Karsten, in his 1939 memorandum to the colonial government, referring to Menteng Project and several other residential projects in the Indies - pointed out that real estate offices and the building trade have turned their attention to the needs of the upper middle class - particularly those of the Europeans, but moreover those of the small category categories of the other population groups in that class (i.e. natives and foreign orientals, mostly Chinese).

=== History ===
==== Before Menteng ====
The land that is now Menteng's residential area was originally privately owned estates located at Menteng and Gondangdia. Between 1755 and 1762, the Menteng estate belonged to a Moor Assan Nina Daut. In 1790, the land was handed over to Pieter J. du Chene de Vienne. In 1815, the land was handed over to Jakob P. Barends. In 1867, the land was handed over to an Arab man from Hadramaut, one of the recorded descendants was the Shahap/Shahab family who were the landlords of the private land in what is now Menteng from 1881 to 1990, as recorded in the 1817 Regerings-Almanak. In 1890, this private land was an estate of 73 hectares inhabited by 3,562 peasants, situated south of Kebon Sirih neighborhood (south of Koningsplein). In 1901 the land recorded was being used for rice paddies, fields and coconut plantation.

When the city of Batavia was confident to absorb new supply of middle-class housing – as well as to prevent further illegal kampung development from encroaching onto this area – the city decided to purchase the Menteng land and created the technical commission to oversee its development. De Bouwploeg was established to acquire a plot of land in Menteng and another 73 hectares of land from the Gondangdia private estate. The land in the Gondangdia private estate was bought by Bouw- en Cultuur Maatschappij Gondangdia from a Dutch widow J.V.D. Bergh in 1892, which at that time was inhabited by 3,052 peasants.

==== Development of Menteng ====
Moojen's original plan for Menteng resembles the garden city model of Ebenezer Howard. The plan combined wide cross-cutting boulevards with concentric rings of streets and a central public square. At the northern entrance to the Menteng residential area, he designed civic landmarks: the Art Center, the cultural center of early 20th-century Batavia.

Although planning for Menteng began in 1910, it was not until 1912 that Moojen's revised plan was officially unveiled. Key difference with the original garden city model was that Menteng was not intended to be a freestanding, self-contained place, but to link up with adjacent residential areas. For example, the broad Nassau Boulevard (now Jalan Imam Bonjol) that bisected the Menteng residential area adjacent to the central square (now Taman Suropati) was intended to connect Tanah Abang (an important market place) to the west and Meester Cornelis to the east. The Java Street (Javaweg, now Jalan HOS Cokroaminoto) was to serve as a north–south connector from Kebon Sirih to the southern fringe of Batavia, the boundary was marked at that time by the line of a flood canal.

Moojen's plan was later extensively modified by F.J. Kubatz as part of the city's next development plan. In the Kubatz plan, the street pattern was changed and a small pond (Situ Lembang) was added to the east of the central park area, originally named Bisschooplein after G.J. Bishop, mayor of Batavia (1916-1920). Other architects contributed to the character of Menteng Residential Area through landmarks. Architect Ghijsels designed Indies-styled houses, St. Paul's Church and the adjacent Logegebouw, which was the office of the burgemester, centrally positioned and facing the central park (now the Indonesian national development planning board (BAPPENAS)). Ghijsels's colleagues in the AIA, architect J.F.L. Blankenberg, designed some lavish residences in Menteng between 1926 and 1939 (after Ghijsels had returned to the Netherlands) e.g. the home of the owner of Wellenstein & Krausse Company (1926, now the residence of the US Ambassador to Indonesia), home of the Governor of Jakarta (1939), and several lavish residences for local businessmen along Jalan Imam Bonjol (one of which is now the National Proclamation Museum).

During the 1932-1937 Great Depression, development of Menteng slowed down. During the period, houses in Menteng were built in two levels, partly to expand the building area without having to increase land plot. These two-floors buildings were partly inspired by similar houses designed by Moojen in Kramat V-VII in 1919. These houses in Menteng were located in van Heutszboulevard (Jalan Teuku Umar), van Breen weg (Jalan Latuharhari), Nassau Boulevard (Jalan Imam Bonjol) and Oranje Boulevard (Jalan Diponegoro). After the crisis, development was enacted again, such as the construction of St. Paul's Church.

The Menteng Project provided commissions for growing architect and planning firms that had set up in Batavia, which included M.J. Hulswit, the very prominent A.A. Fermont and Eduard Cuypers, Biezeveld and Moojen, Bakker and Meyboom, AIA. Other firms active in Menteng Project were Semarang-based Karsten, Lutjens, Toussaint, and Henri Maclaine Pont; and Bandung-based C.P. Schoemaker and Associates.

==== Post-colonial period ====
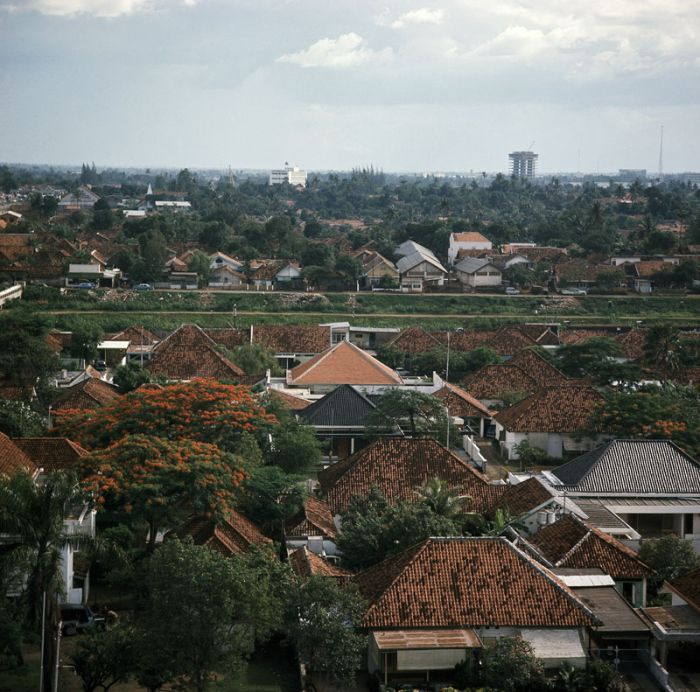
Menteng residential area in the 1970s.

In the post-colonial period, the prestige of Menteng was transferred to the indigenous urban elite of Jakarta. Escalating land values in the center of Jakarta exerted pressures on the edges of Menteng to convert to more intensive non-residential uses in later years. A 1975 gubernatorial decree declared Menteng a cultural heritage area, citing its distinctive architecture, which often includes high, slanting roofs and ample gardens. During the 1980s, the west part of Menteng was transformed into a commercial area, such as Sabang Street (now Agus Salim street), Jaksa Street, Teuku Cik Di Tiro Street, and Menteng Raya Street. Most of them changed into shops, hotels, offices, and restaurants. The Jalan Jaksa Festival is held every year in Jaksa Street. Since the 1990s, a community of architects, historians, preservationists, and re-greening advocates tried to the preserve the quality of the Menteng original plan.

Presently, conservation of Menteng residential area has shown many problems. Despite being a cultural heritage area, many houses were renovated into a Neoclassical style by newcomers, a style which has no relation with Menteng residential area's characteristic early 20th-century modern architecture. Authorities may stop the construction of a building which violate the Menteng style, but some projects resume until the houses are finished. Other problem related to the conservation of Menteng residential area are banning of businesses in the area despite the rising land taxes, fraud by architects of the newly renovated buildings, and the general lack of knowledge in conservation.

=== Urban design and planning ===
The Menteng project was the first housing project in Jakarta that followed the first law of urban planning in Batavia, known as Bataviasche Bouwverordening. Menteng was influential in the introduction of a new Indies architectural language. New Indies Style, a modern architectural movement in the Dutch Indies, was strongly implemented in Menteng. The new style combines the old Indisch style one-storey villas with modern two-storey structures. Prominent roof form (e.g. mansard roof and pyramid-shaped hip roof) was characteristic of house design in Menteng. Other characteristic element of houses in Menteng were front terraces, wide courtyard, characteristic textures in the wall, tall windows and doors with cross ventilations. Other architectural style popular in Menteng during its development were mostly early 20th-century modern movement e.g. Art Deco, Dutch Nieuwe Zakelijkheid, the original New Indies Stye, and Art Nouveau. Older style e.g. Classicist Empire Style and Old Indies Style sometimes appeared in the architecture of old villas at the fringe of the Menteng project, some were converted into museums, otherwise demolished for new development.

The residences of Menteng was classified into several classes according to a recommendation by the Department of Civil Works (Burgerlijke Openbare Werken):

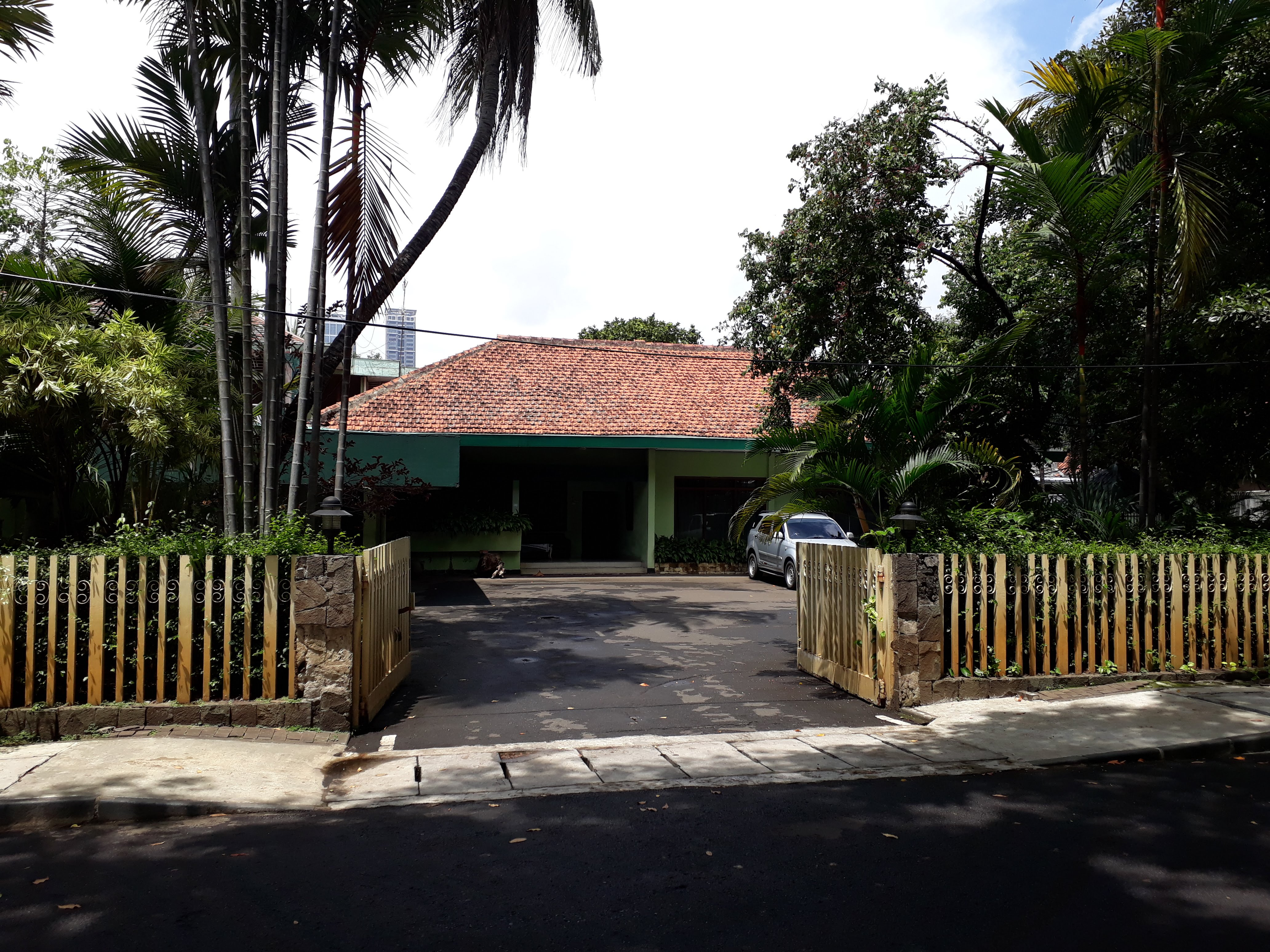
Residence of former president Suharto on Jalan Cendana

Mid-high class residences The residence was classified as class 1 to 3. The houses of these type were built in the core area of Menteng and were targeted for high officials and high class Dutch or European civilians. The architecture style was known as "Transitional Period" (Overgangs periode), which is the style of architecture between the latest stage of "Oud Indische Huis" style, with its typical wide courtyard and wide terraces, to the more modern style called the New Indies Style or the "European Villa". The area is connected with wide boulevards.

Houses in this class are generally one or two floored free-standing house (vrijstaand huis) with one or two wings/pavilions attached to the main building. Examples are the lavish houses along Jalan Imam Bonjol and surrounding Taman Suropati.

Mid-low class residences The residence was classified as class 4 to 7. These are the most dominant type of houses in Menteng. The architecture style is a fusion between the Dutch Transitional Period houses and local traditional houses. The area is connected with narrower streets, classified in Dutch as Laan, Straat or Weg. There were three types of small villas, the Tosari, the Sumenep, and the Madura, all were designed with garage and house servants facilities kept under 500 sqm, a prototype for houses in modern Indonesia.

Residence class 6 and 7 were targeted for the colonial government officials and was known as Land Woningen Voor Ambtenaren (Dutch "Country Houses for Officials"). Generally, these houses are one-floored and can sometimes be a semi-detached house (Dutch koppel).

=== Streets, parks, and facilities ===
Entree Gondangdia ("Gondangdia Entrance") was constructed when Moojen designed and constructed the Bataviasche Kunstkring (1913-1914). The area which was formed by what is now Jalan Cut Meutia - Railtrack - Jalan Gondangdia was the oldest part of Menteng.

The master plan of Menteng included some facilities and infrastructures:

- N.V. de Bouwploeg Architects office, (now Cut Mutiah Mosque).
- Bataviasche Kunstkring (now the Kunstkring Art Gallery)
- Nassaukerk (now St. Paulus Church).
- Gedung Ditjen Kebudayaan
- A school building (now in HOS. Cokroaminoto Street)
- Parks cover about 30 percent of the area in 23 places (e.g. Suropati Park and Situ Lembang).

== Transport ==
Menteng is served by KRL Commuterline, Mass Rapid Transit, and Transjakarta buses.

=== Commuterline ===
- B07 Gondangdia railway station is located north-east of the district.
- B08 Cikini railway station is located south-east of the district.
- C12 Sudirman railway station is located south-west of the district.

=== Mass Rapid Transit ===
- M13 Bundaran HI MRT station is located at Thamrin Road, north of Bundaran HI.
- M12 Dukuh Atas BNI MRT station is located at Thamrin Road, westernmost of the district.

== Landmarks ==
The Abel Sorensen-designed Hotel Indonesia, built in 1962. Now managed by Kempinski, and surrounded by a massive shopping mall called Grand Indonesia.

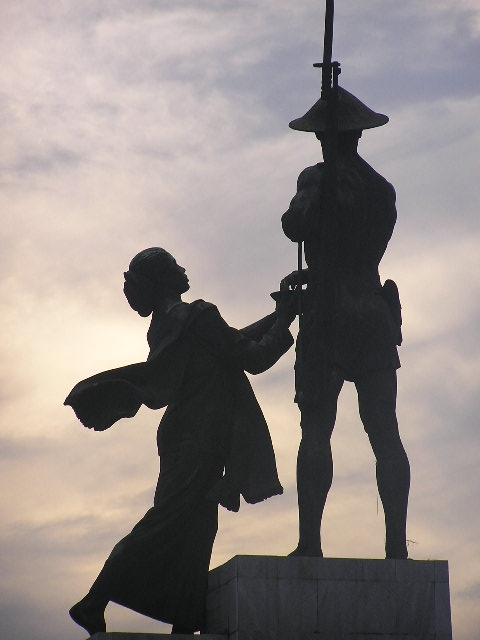
Farmer's Monument.

- Canisius College
- Dukuh Atas BNI MRT station
- Cut Meutia Mosque
- Entertainment X'nter
- Gedung Joeang 45
- Gedung Perintis Kemerdekaan
- Gondangdia Station
- Grand Hyatt and Plaza Indonesia
- Hotel Indonesia, the first luxurious hotel in Indonesia and a landmark of Jakarta.
- Jakarta Theater
- Kunstkring Art Gallery
- Mandarin Hotel
- Megaria Theater (formerly Menteng Theater)
- Menara Thamrin
- Menteng Park (the site of the former Menteng Stadium)
- Selamat Datang Monument, in the middle of Bundaran HI (Hotel Indonesia)
- Formulation of Proclamation Text Museum (Museum Perumusan Naskah Proklamasi)
- Nikko Hotel
- Patung Pahlawan
- Sarinah (Graha Mataram)
- Sasmita Loka Ahmad Yani Museum
- Saint Paul's Church
- Saint Theresia's Church
- Sunda Kelapa Mosque
- Taman Ismail Marzuki
- The Hermitage Hotel, Menteng (formerly the “Telefoongebouw” and University of Bung Karno)
- Taman Suropati
- Taman Proklamasi
- Taman Situ Lembang

== Notable residents ==
- Mohammad Hatta, Indonesia's first vice president
- Sutan Takdir Alisjahbana, poet, writer and intellectual
- Hamid II, Sultan of Pontianak, Indonesian monarch and politician
- Loa Sek Hie, colonial politician and landlord
- Adam Malik, 3rd vice president of Indonesia
- Barack Obama, 44th president of the United States. Lived in Menteng during his childhood years
- Sutan Sjahrir, 1st prime minister of Indonesia
- Achmad Soebardjo, 1st foreign minister of Indonesia
- Suharto, 2nd president of Indonesia
- Megawati Soekarnoputri, 5th president of Indonesia
- William Soeryadjaya, Chinese-Indonesian tycoon
