= Waskita Karya =

Indonesian state-owned construction company

PT Waskita Karya (Persero) Tbk
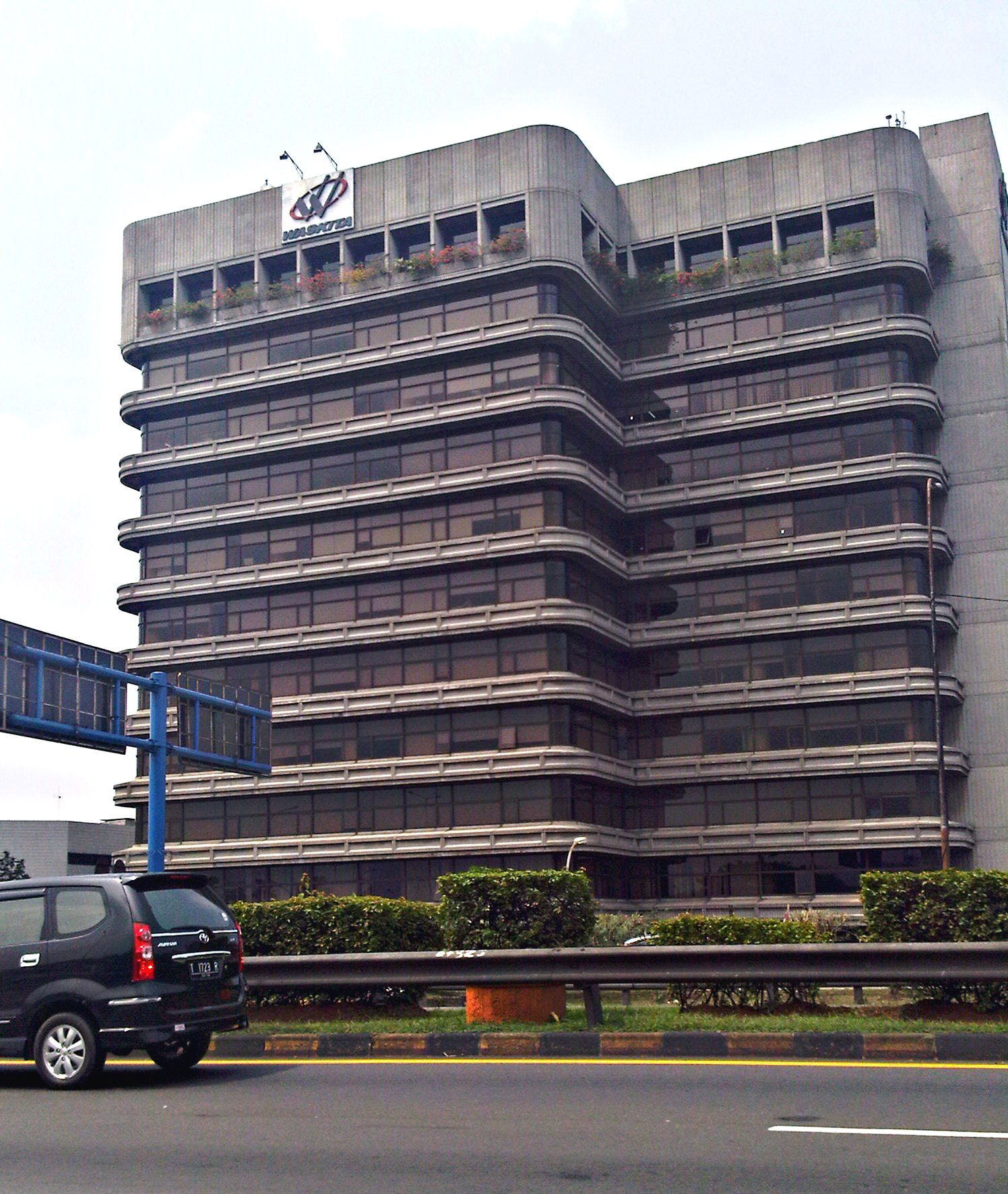
- Waskita Heritage, the Waskita Karya headquarters in Jakarta
- Type: State-owned PT
- Traded as: IDX: WSKT
- Industry: Construction
- Founded: 1 January 1961; 65 years ago
- Headquarters: Cawang, East Jakarta, Jakarta Indonesia
- Area served: Indonesia
- Products: Hotel; Apartments; Offices
- Brands: Vasaka; Teraskita
- Services: Infrastructure construction; Building construction; EPC; Precast; Steel cast; Property; Investments
- Revenue: Rp 16.190 trillion (2020)
- Net income: Rp -9.496 trillion (2020)
- Total assets: Rp 105.589 trillion (2020)
- Total equity: Rp 16.578 trillion (2020)
- Owner: Government of Indonesia
- Number of employees: 1,956 (2020)
- Subsidiaries: PT Waskita Beton Precast Tbk. PT Waskita Karya Infrastruktur; PT Waskita Karya Realty; PT Waskita Toll Road
- Website: www.waskita.co.id

PT Waskita Karya (Persero) Tbk, trading as Waskita Karya, is an Indonesian state-owned construction company located in Cawang, Jakarta. It was the result of a January 1, 1961 nationalization of Volker Aannemings Maatschappij NV, the Indonesian branch of what would become VolkerWessels. Waskita specializes in commercial and residential building contracts.

== Controversy ==
Waskita Karya is known for late paying on their vendors and not been able to pay Maturity Bond Coupons. On 27 April 2023 the President Director of Waskita Karya, Destiawan Soewardjono along with 7 other people was detained by the Attorney General's Office of Indonesia for corruption. Destiawan played the role of ordering and approving the disbursement of supply chain financing (SCF) funds using fake supporting documents to be used as payment for the company's debt due to the disbursement of payments for fictitious work projects to fulfill the suspect's request. The total loss of the corruption were about RP 2.5 Trillion (US$67 Million).

== Projects ==
Selected major projects, by year of completion, are:

- APT Pranoto Airport, Samarinda (2018)
- Samarinda International Airport, Samarinda (2014)
- Tsunami Museum, Tsunami Museum, Aceh (2009)
- Wisma BNI, Jakarta (1996)
- Niaga Tower, Jakarta (1992)
- TVRI Tower, Jakarta (1982)
