= Menteng Stadium =

Football stadium in Central Jakarta, Indonesia

Menteng Stadium was a multi-purpose stadium in Menteng, Central Jakarta, Indonesia. It was used mostly for football reserve matches and was the home stadium of Persija football team. The stadium was built in 1921 with Dutch architects F.J. Kubatz and P.A.J. Moojen and was named Voetbalbond Indische Omstreken Sport (Viosveld).

In October 2006 the stadium was demolished and a public park called Menteng Park was built on the area by the administration of Sutiyoso, governor of Jakarta at that time. The demolition was very debatable amongst the PSSI, because minister of sports Adhyaksa Dault had not approved this action. The stadium's demolition also led to conflicts that almost disbanded Persija Jakarta.
