= Menteng Park =

Park in Menteng, Central Jakarta, Indonesia

Taman Menteng
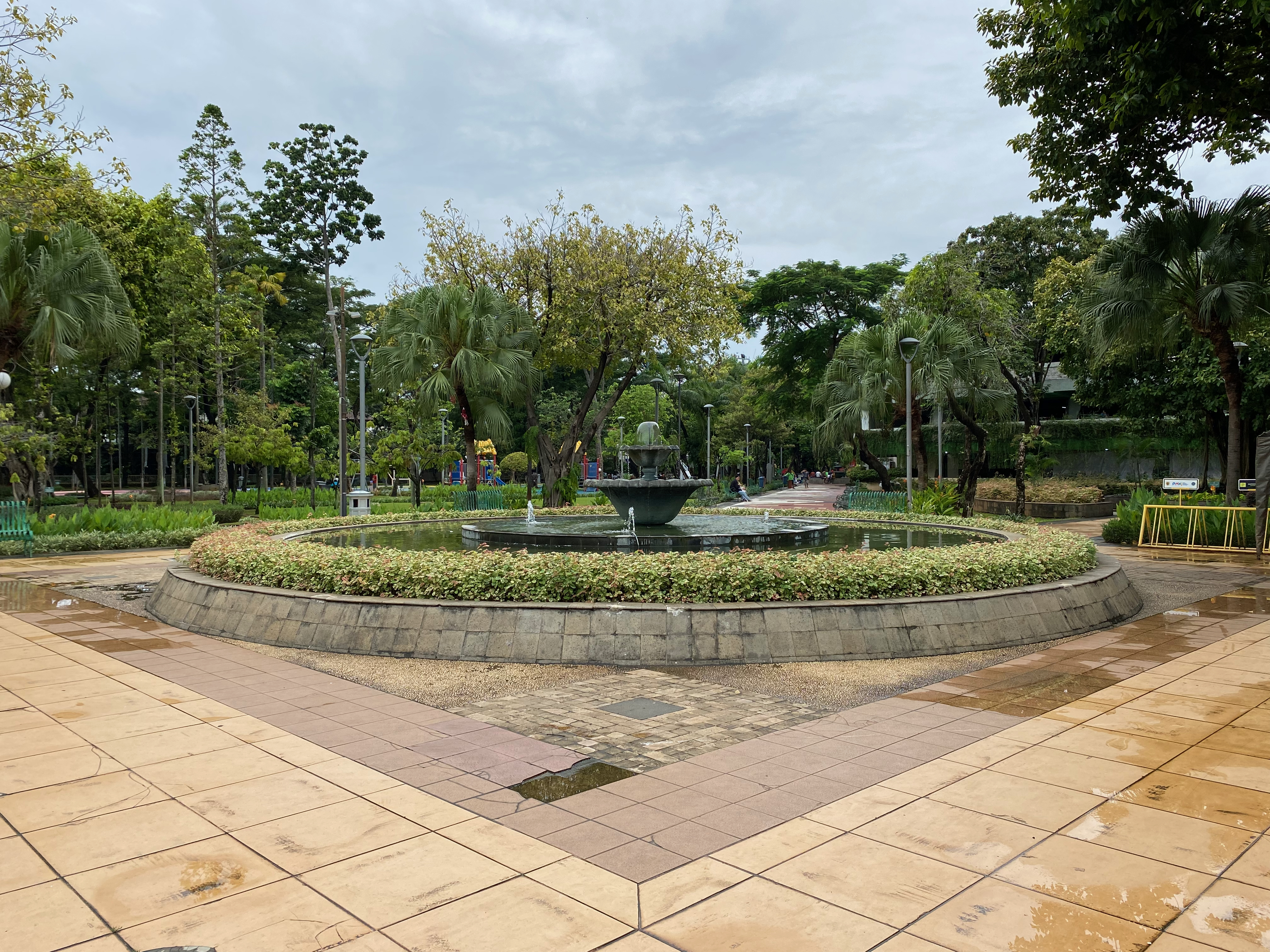
- Taman Menteng in Jakarta, Indonesia

- Location within Jakarta
- Type: Urban park
- Location: Menteng, Jakarta
- Coordinates: 6.19403°S 106.83259°E
- Area: 3 hectares (7.4 acres)
- Created: 2006
- Owner: Provincial Government of Special Capital Region of Jakarta
- Operator: Department of Parks and Cemetery, Jakarta
- Status: Open all year
- Public transit: Transjakarta Corridor 6H: Taman Menteng

Menteng Park (Indonesian: Taman Menteng) is a park located at Menteng, Central Jakarta, Indonesia. This park was formerly occupied by Menteng Stadium. In October 2006 the stadium was demolished and the park was built on the area by the administration of Sutiyoso. The park is located at the center of Menteng residential area. At present it is one of the popular park in Jakarta.

== Description ==
The park stands on an area of 30 hectares, and has a collection of 30 different plant species. Menteng Park also has a variety of support facilities such as a playground for children, as well as futsal and basketball courts, jogging track, greenhouse, parking lot and exhibition corner. There are free WiFi facility at different corners of the park. After dark the park area turns into a place for food lovers because of presence of food vendors. Uniquely, in this park there are also 44 absorption wells to help the absorption of rain water into the soil.

== History ==
Before the creation of the park, there was the multi-purpose Menteng Stadium. It was used mostly for football reserve matches and was the home stadium of Persija football team. The stadium was built in 1921 with Dutch architects F.J. Kubatz dan P.A.J. Moojen and was named Voetbalbond Indische Omstreken Sport (VIOS-veld).

In October 2006 the stadium was demolished and a public park called Menteng Park was built on the area by the administration of Sutiyoso, governor of Jakarta at that time. The demolition was very debatable amongst the PSSI, because the Minister of Youth and Sports Affairs Adhyaksa Dault had not approved this action. The stadium's demolition also led to conflicts that almost disbanded Persija Jakarta.

== See also ==
- Menteng Stadium
