= TVRI Tower =

TVRI TV Tower
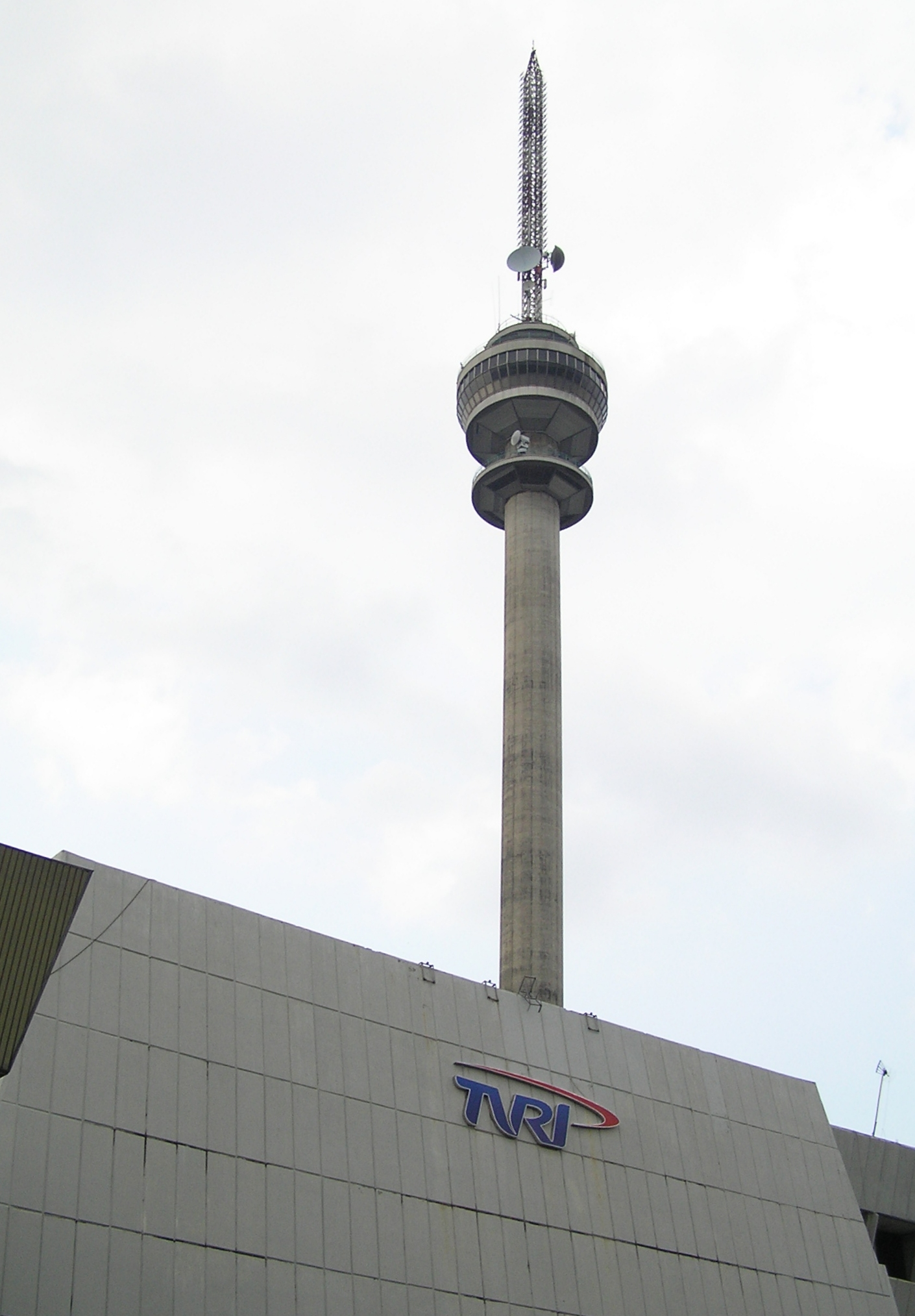
- TVRI station tower in Senayan, Jakarta with its seventh logo
- Interactive map of the TVRI TV Tower area
- Alternative names: Menara TVRI

General information
- Status: Completed
- Type: television tower
- Location: Kompleks Televisi Republik Indonesia, Gelora, Tanah Abang, Central Jakarta, Jakarta, Indonesia
- Coordinates: 6°12′46″S 106°48′2″E
- Construction started: 1 April 1975
- Completed: 24 August 1977
- Opening: 24 August 1982
- Inaugurated: 24 August 1982
- Owner: Televisi Republik Indonesia

Height
- Height: 144 metres (472 feet)
- Tip: 2 metres (6.6 feet)
- Antenna spire: 42 metres (138 feet)
- Roof: 100 metres (330 feet)
- Top floor: 104 metres (341 feet)
- Observatory: 96 metres (315 feet)

Technical details
- Material: Reinforced concrete
- Floor count: 8
- Lifts/elevators: 1, created by Otis Elevator Company

Design and construction
- Architect: Wiratman Wangsadinata
- Architecture firm: PT Yodya Karya
- Engineer: M. Arifin
- Structural engineer: PT RBW Consulting Engineer
- Main contractor: PT Waskita Karya (Persero) Tbk and Kajima Corporation

The TVRI Tower (Indonesian: Menara TVRI) is a 144-metre high television transmitter tower located in Jakarta, Indonesia. Started construction on 1 April 1975 and completed on 24 August 1977, this tower was at one time one of the tallest structures in Jakarta and Indonesia.

== History ==
Since its establishment on 17 August 1962, TVRI broadcasts in Jakarta and its surroundings have been emitted from an 85-meter high iron antenna located near the current position of the tower, which was funded from Japanese war reparations and built by Nippon Electric Company.

The construction of a transmitter tower had been planned since May 1, 1972 as part of the construction of a television station complex which was carried out to suit the surrounding environment which included the Parliament Complex of the Republic of Indonesia and the Gelora Bung Karno Stadium. Construction will start on 1 April 1975 by Joint venture Indonesia-Japan P.T. Waskita, and Kajima.

The tower was completed on 24 August 1977 and started functioning in 1978. The tower was inaugurated on 24 August 1982 along with the new studio building.

== See also ==
- Fernsehturm Stuttgart
- List of tallest towers in the world
- List of transmission sites
