= Jakarta =

Capital and largest city in Indonesia

- Special capital region
- Special Capital Region of Jakarta; Daerah Khusus Ibukota Jakarta
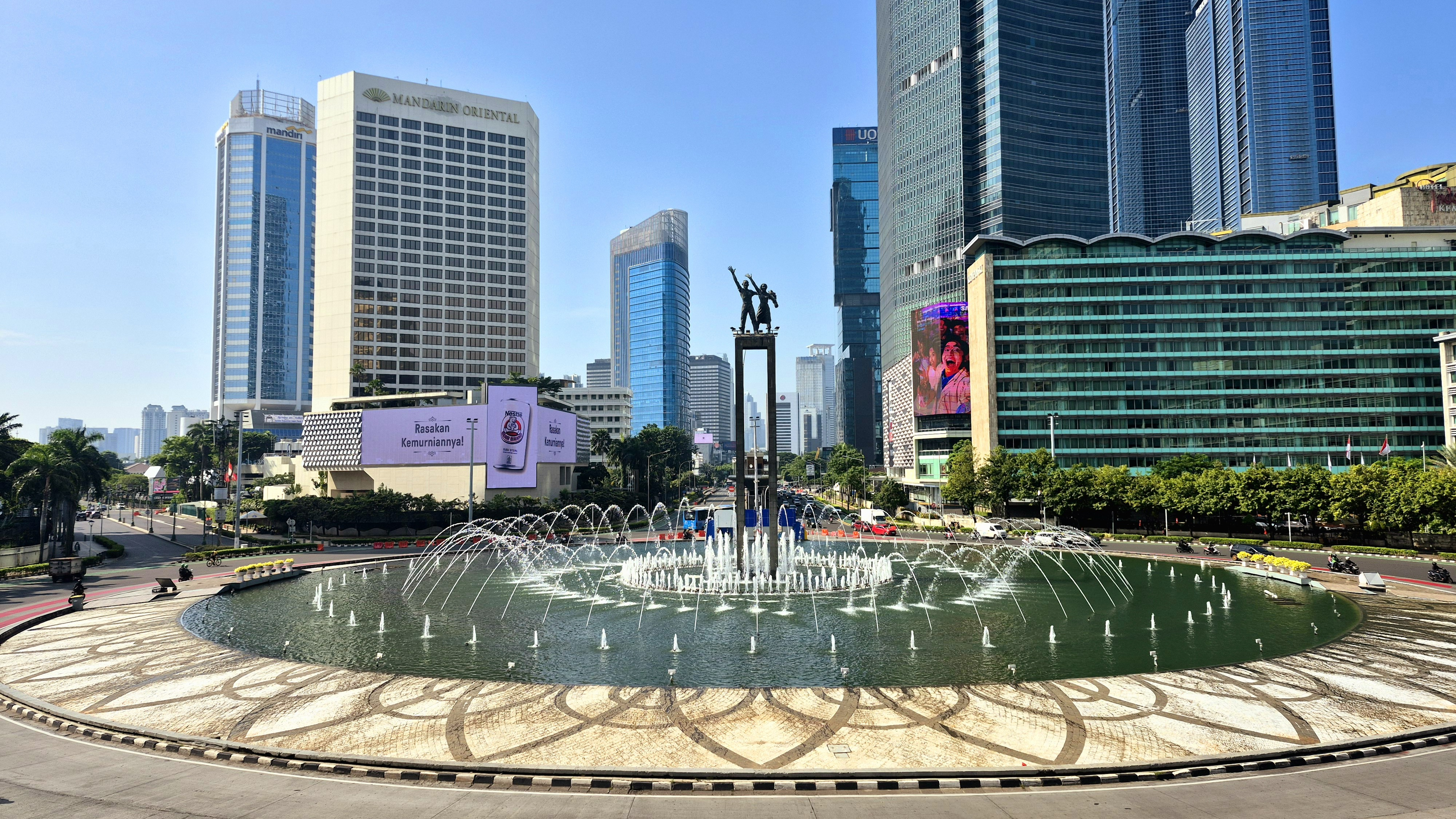
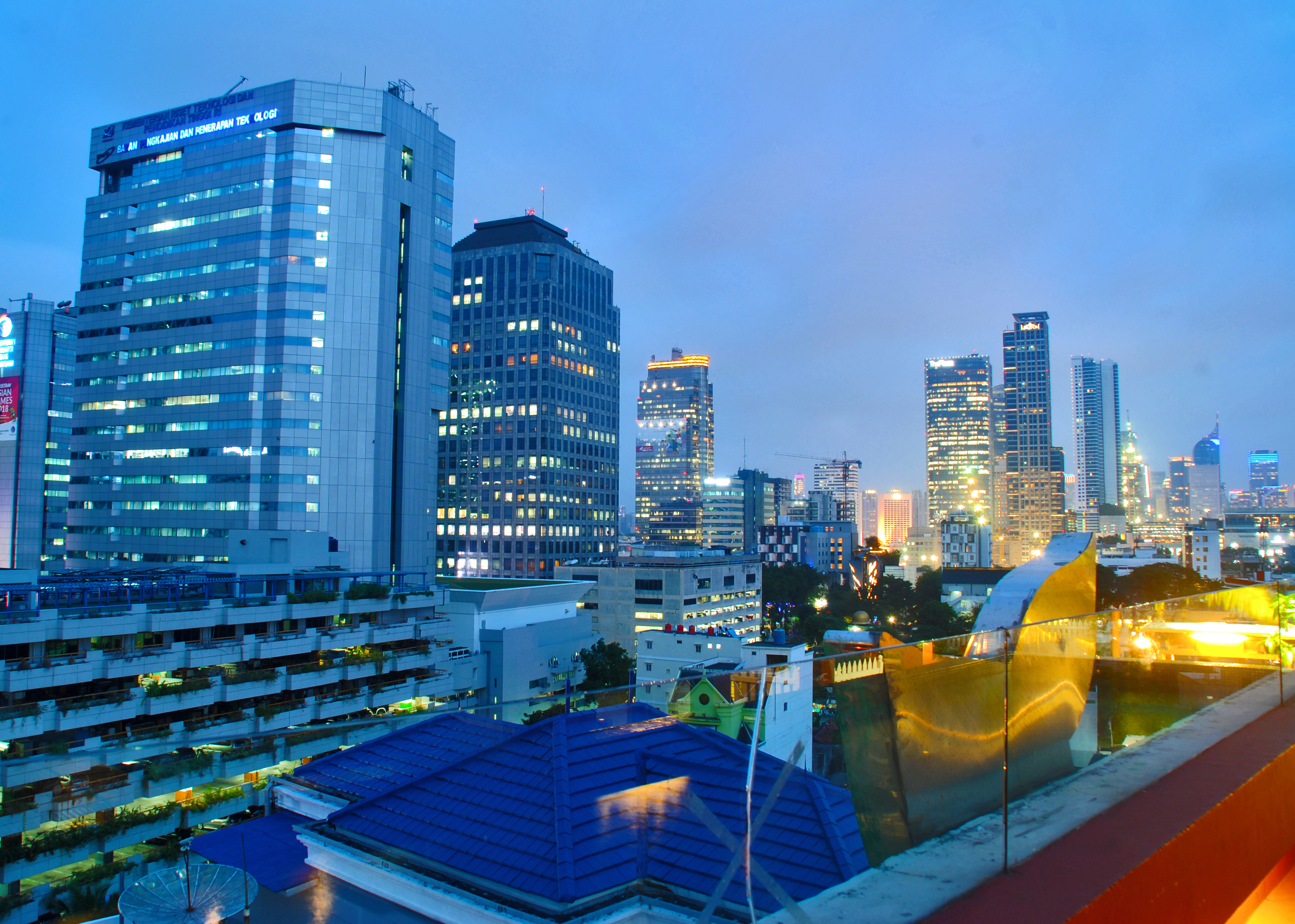
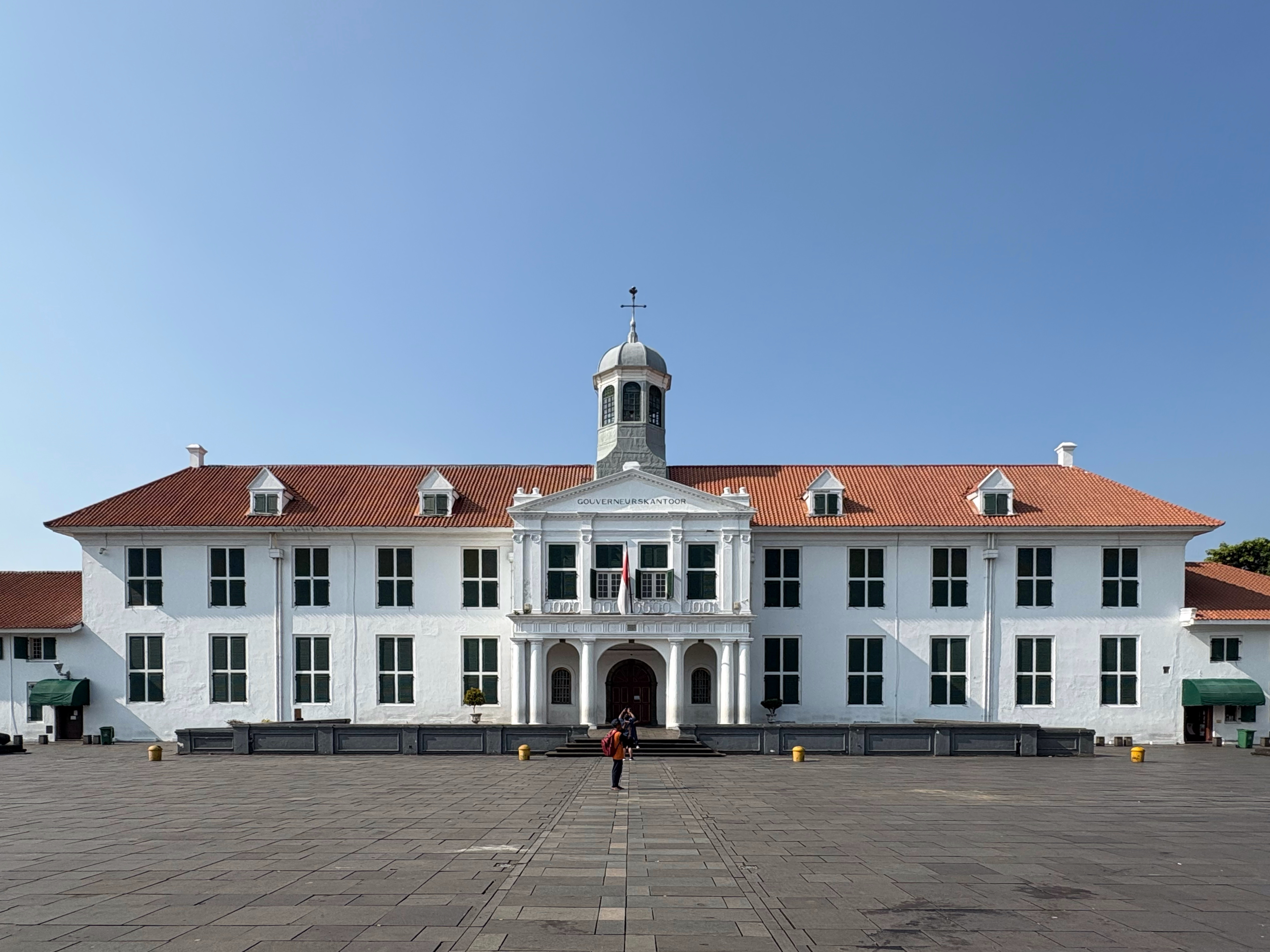
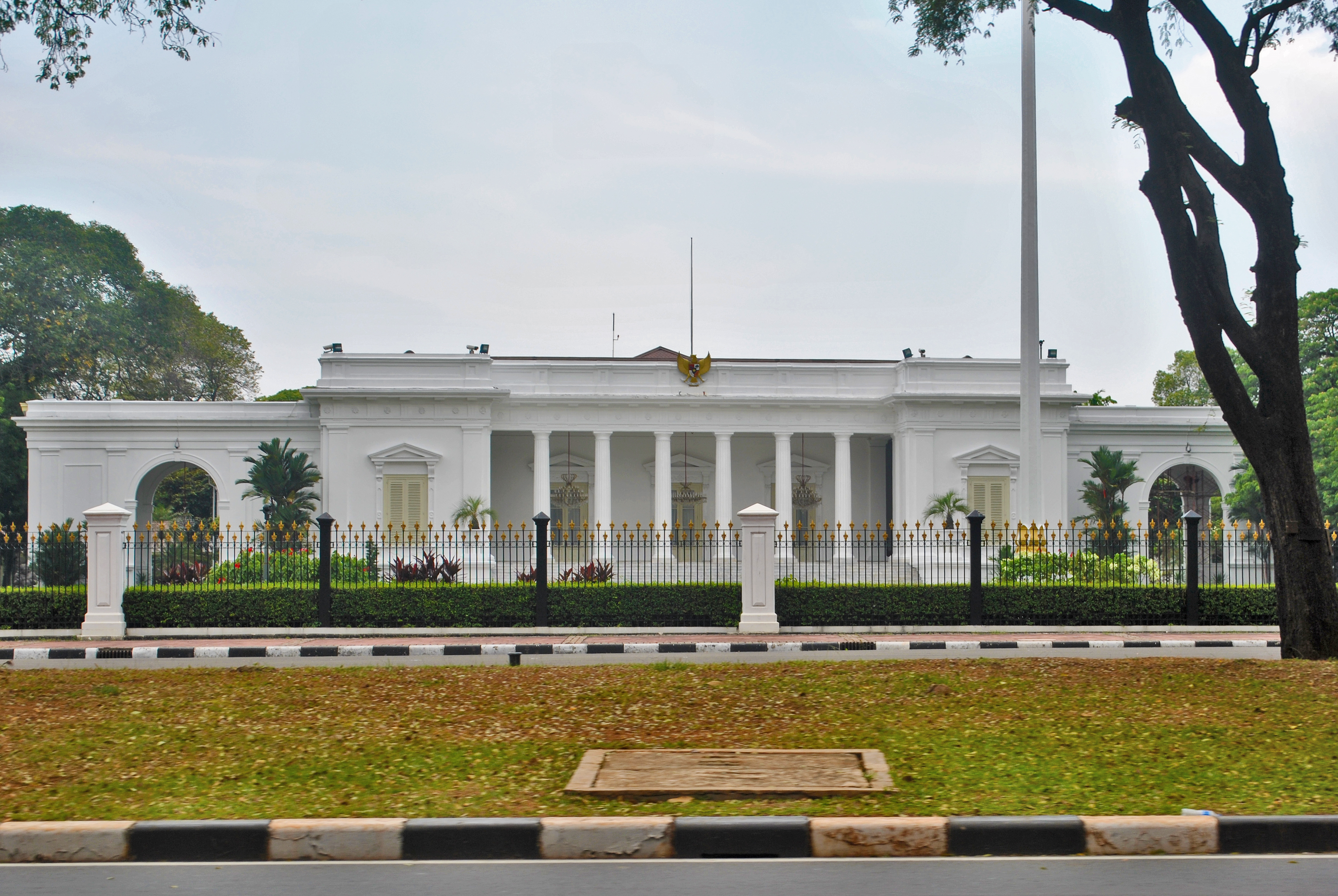
- Selamat Datang Monument Jakarta CBD Jakarta Old Town Merdeka Palace Monas

- Coat of arms
- Nickname: The Big Durian
- Motto: Jaya Raya (Sanskrit) "Victorious and Great"
- Interactive map of Jakarta
- Location in Java, Indonesia, and Asia Jakarta (Indonesia) Jakarta (Asia)
- Coordinates: 6°11′S 106°50′E
- Country: Indonesia
- Administrative section: List: Central Jakarta; North Jakarta; South Jakarta; West Jakarta; East Jakarta; Thousand Islands
- Metropolitan area: Jabodetabek
- Foundation (as Jayakarta): 22 June 1527; 499 years ago
- Creation (as Batavia): 30 May 1619; 407 years ago
- Province status: 18 January 1957; 69 years ago

Government
  - Type: Provincial government
  - Body: Special Capital Region of Jakarta Provincial Government
  - Governor: Pramono Anung (PDI-P)
  - Vice Governor: Rano Karno
  - Legislature: Jakarta Regional House of Representatives (DPRD)

Area
  - Special capital region: 664 km^{2} (256 sq mi)
  - Metro: 6,799 km^{2} (2,625 sq mi)
- Elevation: 8 m (26 ft)

Population (mid 2025)
  - Special capital region: 11,010,514
  - Rank: 1st
  - Density: 16,600/km^{2} (42,900/sq mi)
  - Metro: 41,914,000
  - Metro density: 6,165/km^{2} (15,970/sq mi)
- Demonym: Jakartan

GDP (nominal, 2025)
  - Special capital region: Rp 3,926.153 trillion; US$ 238.310 billion
  - Per capita: Rp 367.687 million; US$ 22,317
- Time zone: UTC+07:00 (WIB)
- Postal codes: 10110–14540; 19110–19130
- Area code: +62 21
- ISO 3166 code: ID-JK
- Vehicle registration: B
- HDI (2024): ▲0.850 (1st) – very high
- Website: jakarta.go.id

Jakarta, (Note: (/dʒəˈkɑːrtə/ jə-KAR-tə; Indonesian pronunciation: [d͡ʒaˈkarta]; Betawi: Jakartè, pronounced [d͡ʑakarˈtɛ]; Jakartan slang: Jekardah or Jakardha) Formerly spelled as Djakarta, and formerly known as Batavia) officially the Special Capital Region of Jakarta, (Note: Indonesian: Daerah Khusus Ibukota Jakarta) is the capital and largest city of Indonesia, with administrative status equivalent to a province. It lies on the northwestern coast of Java, bordering West Java and Banten and facing the Java Sea. Jakarta covers about 664 square kilometres (256 square miles) and had 11 million registered residents in 2025. Its urban area extends well beyond the provincial boundary into the wider Jakarta metropolitan area (locally known as Jabodetabek), which had a population of nearly 42 million in 2025 according to the United Nations. It is deemed the largest city in the world.

The area around present-day Jakarta was long associated with Sunda Kelapa, the port of the Sunda Kingdom. Islamic forces captured Kalapa in 1527, after which the settlement became known as Jayakarta and came under the Banten Sultanate. The Dutch East India Company (VOC) seized Jayakarta in 1619 and rebuilt it as Batavia, its main administrative centre in Asia and an important trading port. During the Japanese occupation in World War II, the authorities renamed Batavia to Jakarta. Indonesian independence was proclaimed there in 1945 and after the Indonesian National Revolution, Jakarta became the capital of the unitary republic in 1950.

Jakarta grew rapidly after Indonesian independence. Migration from across Indonesia has shaped its population and culture. Urban growth has spread into Bogor, Depok, Tangerang and Bekasi, which creates a metropolitan region tied together by large, daily commuter flows. Jakarta is Indonesia's financial and trade centre and the centre of national administration. It is also home to many corporate headquarters, media organisations, universities and the secretariat of the Association of Southeast Asian Nations (ASEAN).

Jakarta has no ethnic majority. The largest groups include Javanese, Betawi, Sundanese and Chinese Indonesians. Indonesian is the official language and the main language of public life, while Betawi culture developed from interaction among people of varying origins in colonial Batavia. Jakarta faces persistent issues including traffic congestion, flooding, land subsidence, air pollution, and pressure on water and waste services. In 2022, the Indonesian government began the legal process of moving the country's capital to Nusantara in East Kalimantan, but Jakarta remains the capital until the transfer is formalised by a presidential decree.

== Etymology ==
The area now known as Jakarta has had several names. During the period of the Sunda Kingdom, its harbour was known as Kalapa or Sunda Kalapa and was one of the kingdom's principal ports on the north coast of western Java. A 16th-century account by Portuguese apothecary Tomé Pires referred to the harbour as Calapa.

The name Jayakarta is traditionally linked to the conquest of Kalapa in 1527 by Islamic forces said to have been led by Fatahillah, but surviving records do not confirm that he renamed the settlement. The name is of Sanskrit origin and translates to "victory" or "victorious deed". Early European sources recorded related forms including Iacarta, Xacatra, and Jacatra.

After the Dutch East India Company (VOC) seized and destroyed Jayakarta in 1619, it rebuilt the settlement as Batavia, named for the Batavi, a Germanic people regarded by the Dutch as their ancestors. Batavia remained the city's name until the Japanese occupation in 1942, when the authorities renamed it Jakarta and used the designation Jakaruta Tokubetsu-shi (Japanese: ジャカルタ特別市, lit. 'Jakarta Special Municipality'). Following Indonesian independence, Jakarta became the city's formal name.

== History ==
=== Early settlements and Sunda Kelapa ===
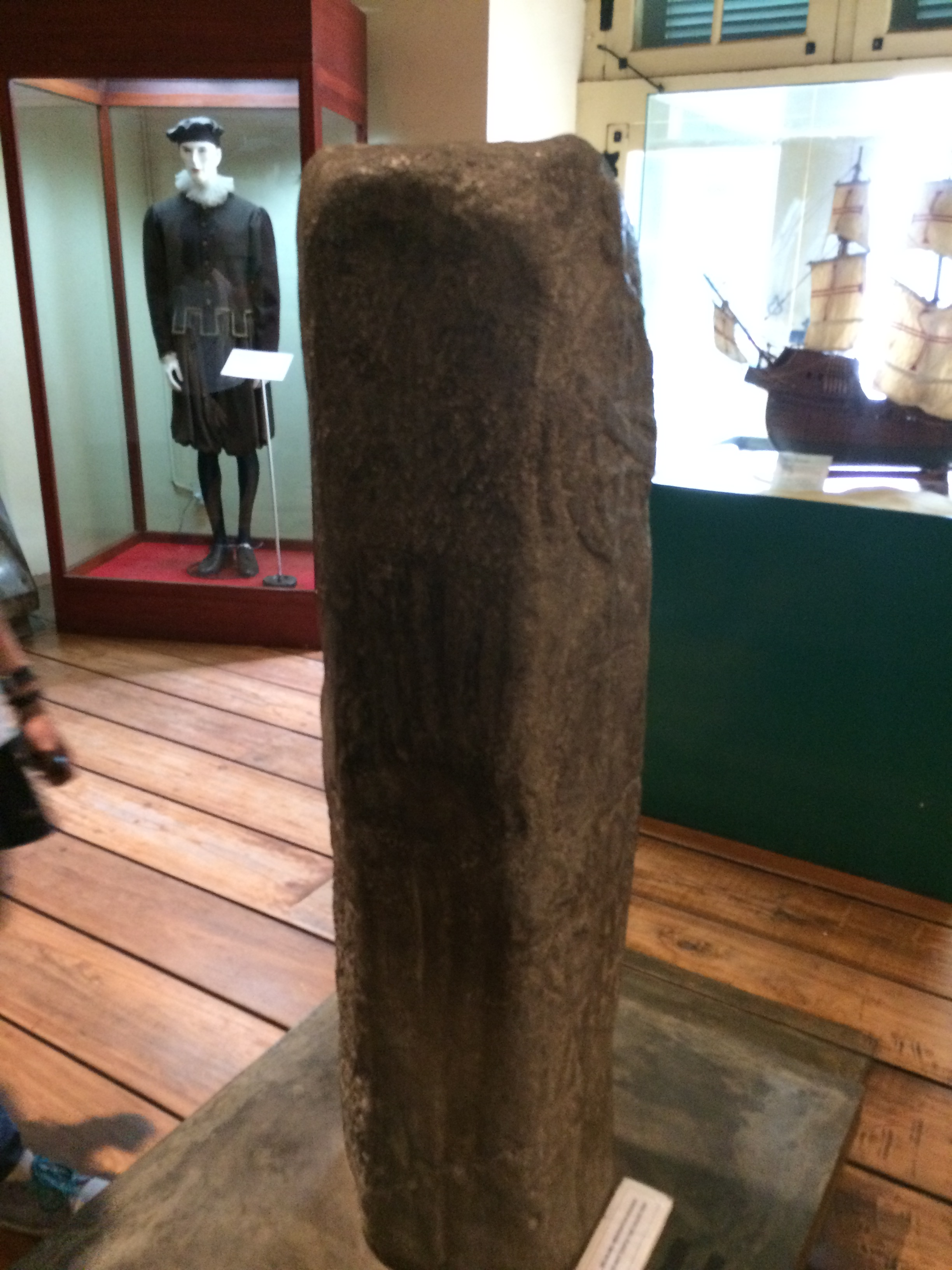
Luso-Sundanese padrão, a monument commemorating a treaty between the Portuguese Empire and the Sunda Kingdom

The Buni culture was a prehistoric pottery culture found in the coastal areas of northern and western Java. It is dated to roughly 400 BC–AD 100, with evidence suggesting that it may have continued until about AD 500. Written evidence from this period includes the mid-5th century Tugu inscription, found near Tanjung Priok in present-day North Jakarta. The inscription records the excavation of two waterways, the Candrabhaga and Gomati, and attributes the latter to King Purnawarman. However, the relationship between the waterways and the identity of the ruler responsible for the Candrabhaga are uncertain.

By the 10th century, the Sunda Kingdom had emerged in western Java and ruled the area around present-day Jakarta. The Chinese work Chu-fan-chi describes Sin-t'o as having a harbour and producing pepper, with the work's translators Friedrich Hirth and William Woodville Rockhill identifying the place meant as Sunda in western Java. By the early 16th century, Kalapa was one of the Sunda Kingdom's leading ports. Tomé Pires described it as Sunda's most important trading port, drawing ships from Sumatra, Malacca, Java and elsewhere.

In March 1513, the Portuguese captain at Malacca sent four ships to Java to obtain spices. The Sunda Kingdom concluded a treaty with Portugal on 21 August 1522. It allowed the Portuguese to build a fortress at Kalapa, as Sunda sought Portuguese support amid pressure from the sultanates of Cirebon and Demak. In 1527, Islamic forces captured Kalapa, but sources differ over whether Fatahillah or Sunan Gunung Jati led the conquest. After the conquest, Kalapa became a dependency of the Banten Sultanate and was recorded in foreign sources as Iacarta, Xacatra or Jacatra. Banten later developed into a major maritime power in western Java.

=== Batavia under Dutch rule ===
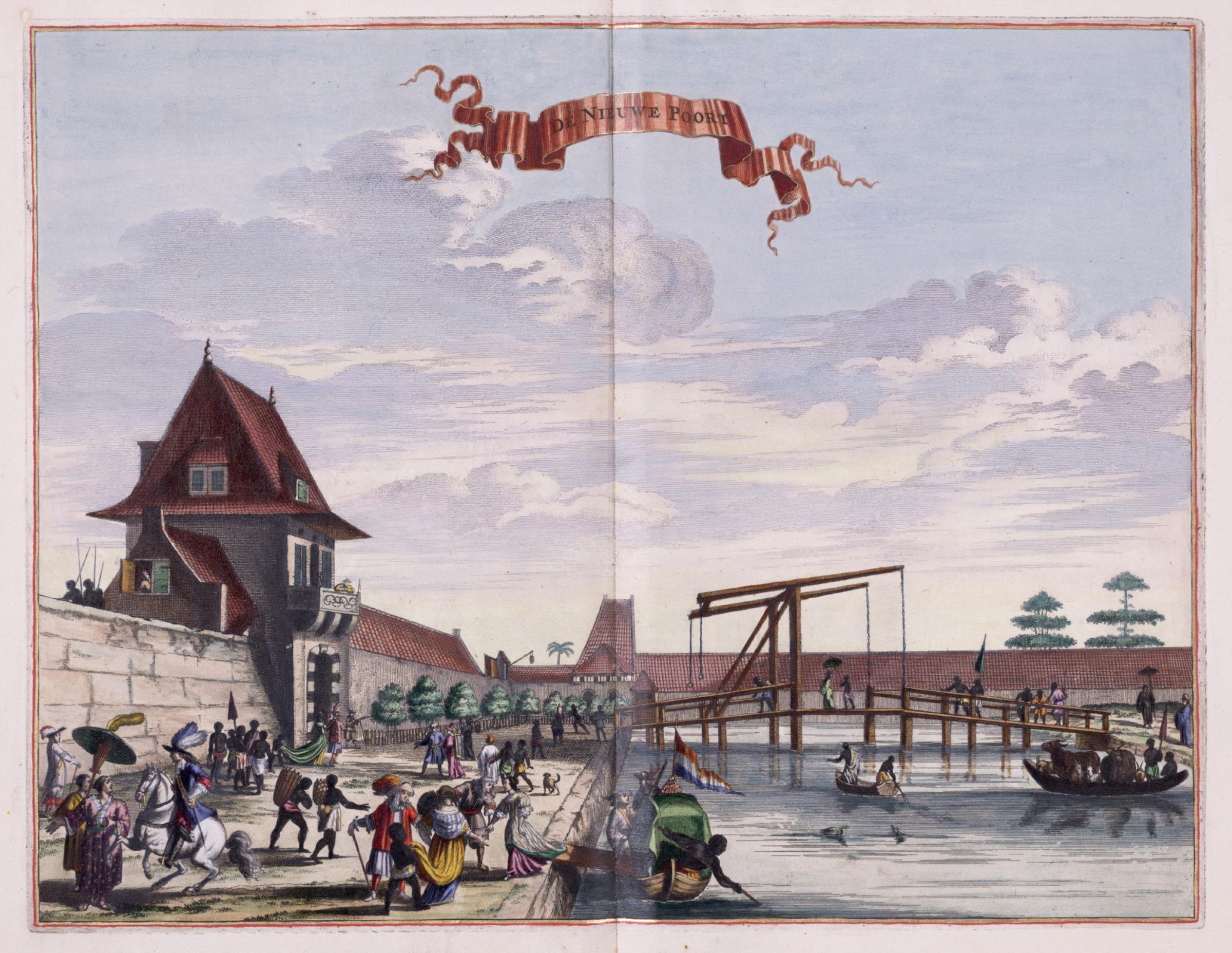
The Nieuwe Poort in Batavia, 1682

In the early 17th century, Jayakarta was under Banten's control and became an object of rivalry between the Dutch East India Company (VOC) and the English East India Company. Following a siege, Dutch naval officer Jan Pieterszoon Coen returned with reinforcements in May 1619, overran Jayakarta and burned the royal residence. The VOC established its Asian headquarters on the site and subsequently named the settlement Batavia.

Batavia developed as a walled canal city on the low coastal plain at the mouth of the Ciliwung river. However, the canals flowed poorly and accumulated sediment, and rapid coastal silting contributed to unhealthy conditions. From the 1730s, disease outbreaks made Batavia increasingly dangerous to live in, and wealthy residents increasingly moved away from the old town.

Despite the health problems, Batavia remained the VOC's main administrative centre in Asia and an important trading port. Chinese residents were involved in Batavia's trade, agriculture, crafts, and construction, and lived both within the city and in the surrounding countryside (Ommelanden). In 1740, unrest among Chinese labourers in the Ommelanden and the VOC's response escalated into a massacre of Chinese residents in Batavia. After the massacre, Chinese settlement continued outside the city walls. In March 1741, the VOC designated a Chinese quarter at Diestpoort, south of Batavia, in an area later known as Glodok.

By the early 19th century, residents were moving away from the unhealthy old town, and the move to Weltevreden (present-day Central Jakarta) sped up Batavia's southward growth. Weltevreden developed around government buildings and spacious residences with gardens, while the lower old town remained a commercial district that included the Chinese quarter. Subsequent growth extended Batavia southward to Menteng and incorporated Meester Cornelis (present-day Jatinegara). In March 1942, Dutch forces surrendered Batavia to Japan, and the Japanese occupation authorities renamed the city Jakarta.

=== Jakarta in independent Indonesia ===
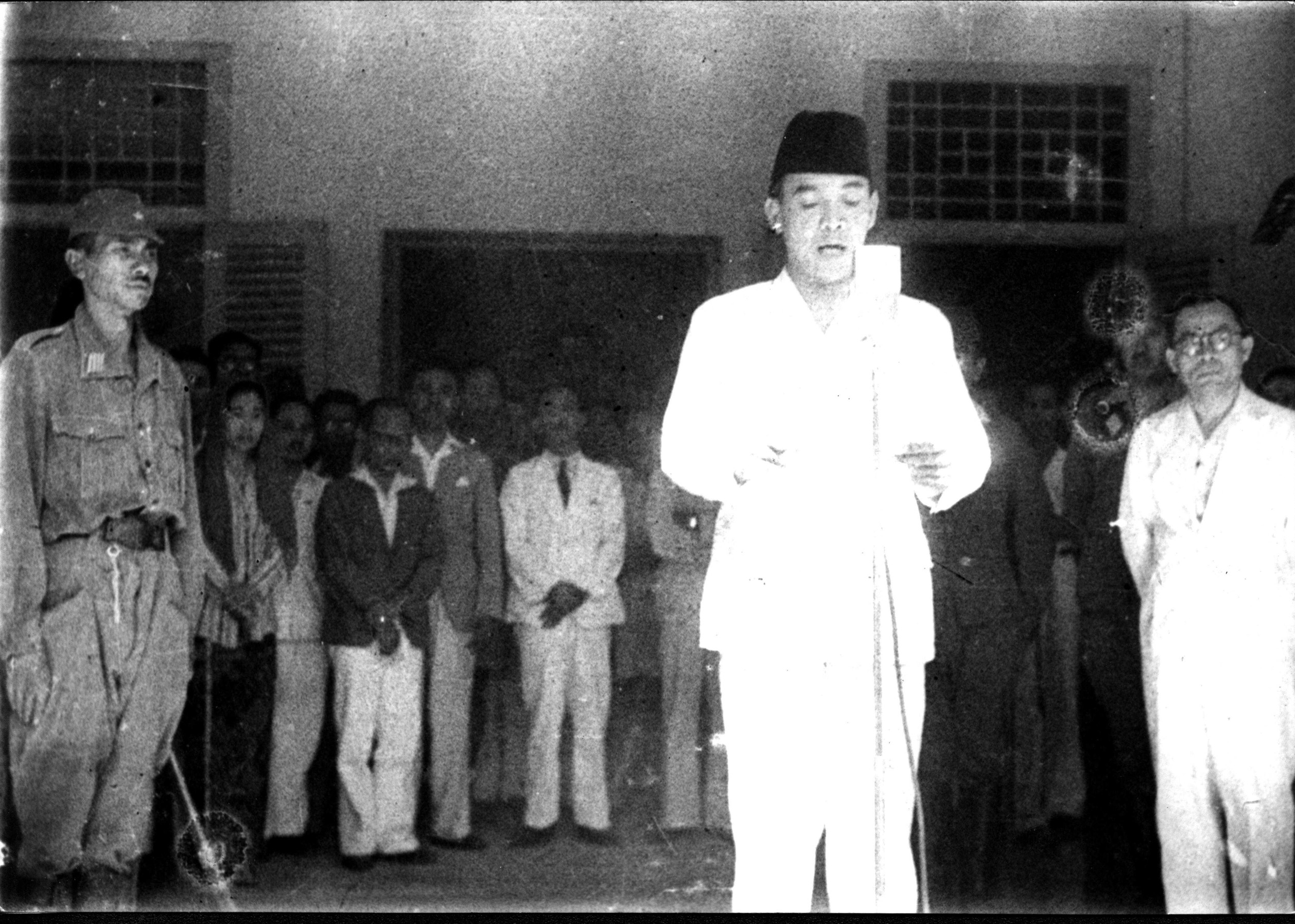
Sukarno reading the Proclamation of Indonesian Independence at Jalan Pegangsaan Timur No. 56, Menteng

Indonesia's independence was proclaimed in Jakarta on 17 August 1945. During the first months of the Indonesian National Revolution, authority in Jakarta was contested among Indonesian, Japanese and Dutch officials. British forces intervened to restore order and a Dutch political takeover was initially blocked by the Allies. As the British consolidated control of Jakarta, the Republican government moved to Yogyakarta, which became its capital in early 1946. Jakarta was made the capital again in 1950 after the federal United States of Indonesia was replaced by the unitary republic of Indonesia.

Under first President Sukarno, Jakarta became the focus of major nation-building projects, some of which were part of preparations for the Asian Games in 1962. These projects included the National Monument, Hotel Indonesia, Sarinah, the Senayan sports complex, and the Thamrin–Sudirman axis. In 1964, new legislation formally reaffirmed the Special Capital Region of Jakarta as Indonesia's capital.

The violence and political upheaval of 1965–66 marked General Suharto's rise to power and the beginning of the New Order. Under Governor Ali Sadikin (1966–77), Jakarta expanded the Kampung Improvement Program to improve basic services in dense kampungs, but modernisation also displaced some poor neighbourhoods. From the 1980s, deregulation and greater private and foreign investment accelerated high-rise construction along Thamrin–Sudirman and large industrial, commercial and residential projects on the metropolitan outskirts.

The Asian financial crisis in 1997–98 intensified student protests and widespread violence in Jakarta. After mounting political pressure, President Suharto resigned on 21 May 1998. In the Reformasi era, decentralisation changed Jakarta's local governance, and residents directly elected the governor for the first time in 2007. In 2022, the central government laid the legal groundwork for moving the national capital to Nusantara. The capital's legal functions remain in Jakarta until a presidential decree formally transfers them to Nusantara.

== Geography ==
Satellite image of the Jakarta metropolitan area and the surrounding western Java, acquired by Sentinel-2.

Jakarta covers about 664 square kilometres (256 sq mi) of land and 6,977 square kilometres (2,694 sq mi) of sea territory, including the waters around the Thousand Islands. The wider metropolitan region, commonly called Jabodetabek, extends into West Java and Banten and covers about 6,799 square kilometres (2,625 sq mi) of land. Daily commuting links Jakarta with surrounding municipalities, including Bogor, Depok, Tangerang and Bekasi.

The city lies on Java's northwestern coast at the mouth of the Ciliwung river, facing Jakarta Bay. Except for some hilly areas in the south, Jakarta spreads across low, flat terrain. Much of Jakarta lies on an alluvial plain, with elevations ranging from below sea level to about 50 metres (160 feet). Thirteen rivers flow through the city from the south toward Jakarta Bay, including the Ciliwung, Angke, Sunter, and Grogol rivers. The alluvial plain was historically swampy, and seasonal flooding remains common. Heavy rain and runoff from upstream areas cause flooding, which can be worsened by high tides, land subsidence, blocked drains and limited river capacity.

Jakarta's flood-control policy has long favoured engineered measures, including canals, dredging, pumping stations and coastal defences. Land subsidence is a major driver of coastal-flood risk in northern Jakarta. Groundwater extraction and the weight of buildings and infrastructure are among the human causes of subsidence. Beyond flooding, Jakarta also faces severe river-water and air pollution, with air pollution imposing substantial health burdens.

=== Climate ===
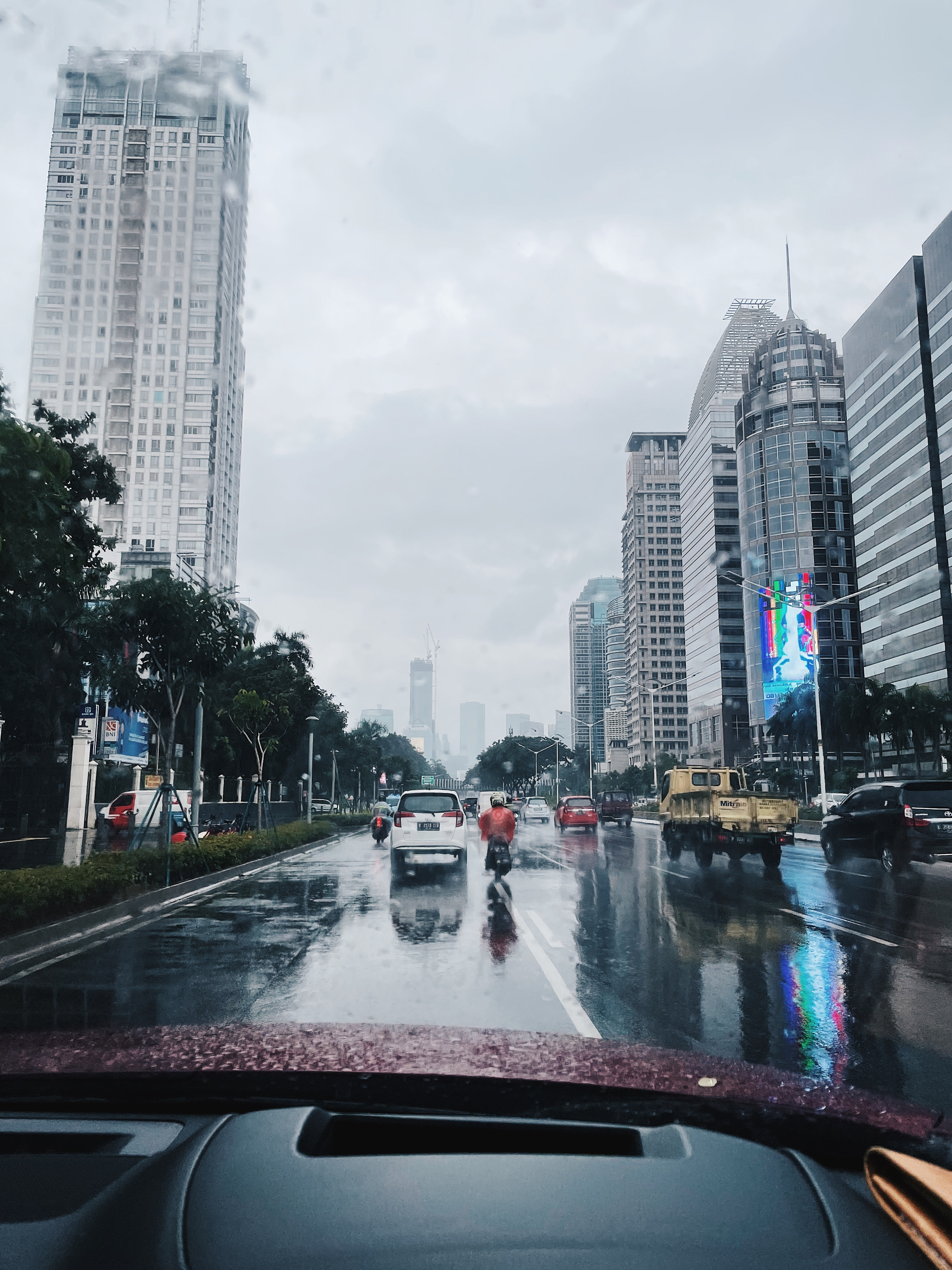
Drizzle in Jakarta

Jakarta has a tropical monsoon climate with distinct wet and dry seasons. Rainfall is much heavier from December to March, while June to September is relatively dry. Flooding is common during the rainy season. Heavy rain and upstream runoff can overwhelm rivers and drains, while high tides, land subsidence and urban development can further increase flood risk.

Jakarta is generally warm throughout the year. At Kemayoran, monthly mean temperatures during 1991–2020 ranged from 27.3 °C (81.1 °F) in February to 28.8 °C (83.8 °F) in October, with an annual mean of 28.2 °C (82.8 °F). The annual averages of daily maximum and minimum temperatures were 32.5 °C (90.5 °F) and 25.5 °C (77.9 °F), respectively. Over the long term, Jakarta has also become warmer, with its annual mean temperature rising by about 1.6 °C (2.9 °F) per century between 1866 and 2012.

Climate data for Jakarta, 1991–2020 normals
Month	Jan	Feb	Mar	Apr	May	Jun	Jul	Aug	Sep	Oct	Nov	Dec	Year
Mean daily maximum °C (°F)	31.0 (87.8)	30.8 (87.4)	32.1 (89.8)	32.8 (91.0)	33.2 (91.8)	32.9 (91.2)	32.7 (90.9)	33.0 (91.4)	33.4 (92.1)	33.4 (92.1)	32.8 (91.0)	32.0 (89.6)	32.5 (90.5)
Daily mean °C (°F)	27.5 (81.5)	27.3 (81.1)	28.0 (82.4)	28.4 (83.1)	28.7 (83.7)	28.4 (83.1)	28.2 (82.8)	28.3 (82.9)	28.6 (83.5)	28.8 (83.8)	28.4 (83.1)	28.0 (82.4)	28.2 (82.8)
Mean daily minimum °C (°F)	25.2 (77.4)	25.2 (77.4)	25.5 (77.9)	25.6 (78.1)	25.8 (78.4)	25.5 (77.9)	25.3 (77.5)	25.3 (77.5)	25.5 (77.9)	25.6 (78.1)	25.6 (78.1)	25.5 (77.9)	25.5 (77.9)
Average precipitation mm (inches)	373.3 (14.70)	381.4 (15.02)	210.4 (8.28)	164.1 (6.46)	103.2 (4.06)	80.4 (3.17)	77.7 (3.06)	51.5 (2.03)	61.0 (2.40)	112.2 (4.42)	134.8 (5.31)	183.3 (7.22)	1,933.3 (76.11)
Average precipitation days (≥ 1.0 mm)	17.5	17.9	14.1	11.5	8.2	6.2	4.8	3.3	4.0	7.4	10.4	12.8	118.1
Mean monthly sunshine hours	84.6	78.9	119.6	129.7	130.4	120.4	148.5	172.3	176.9	153.4	103.0	83.6	1,501.3
Source: World Meteorological Organization / National Oceanic and Atmospheric Administration (1991–2020 climatological normals)

== Cityscape ==
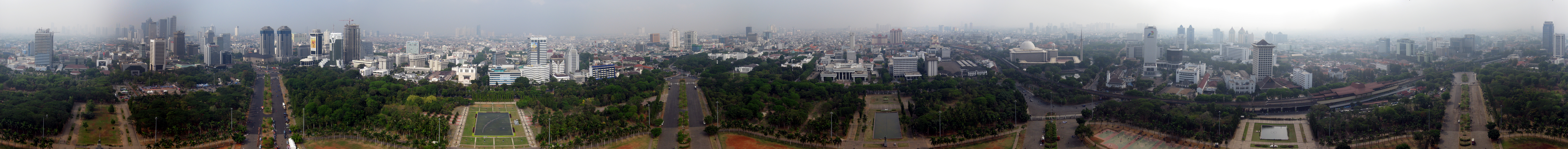
Panorama of Jakarta as seen from the Monas in a full 360-degree view (river flowing from south-west to north-east, left to right)

In the early 19th century, the Dutch colonial administration moved south from old Batavia to Weltevreden, and development along the road between them formed a north–south urban corridor. Kebayoran Baru was developed to the south as an upper-income satellite town between 1950 and 1965. From the late 1960s, growth spread east and west as well, with industrial development concentrated in the east and residential expansion mainly in the west, along with the continuing southward growth. Today, Jakarta has three distinct centres having different roles. The Old Town retains the historic and cultural core, Medan Merdeka–Gambir is dominated by government and monumental buildings, and Sudirman-Thamrin-Kuningan is the main business centre, with many commercial skyscrapers.

High-rise and luxury development in central Jakarta is often close to dense kampungs and slums, some of which are hidden behind buildings along the main roads. Beyond Jakarta's provincial boundary, urban growth has spread through Bogor, Depok, Tangerang and Bekasi, with housing, new towns and industrial estates developing along major transport corridors. Within Jakarta, high-rise development has also expanded from individual towers lining major roads to clustered, mixed-use developments such as the Mega Kuningan superblock.

=== Architecture ===
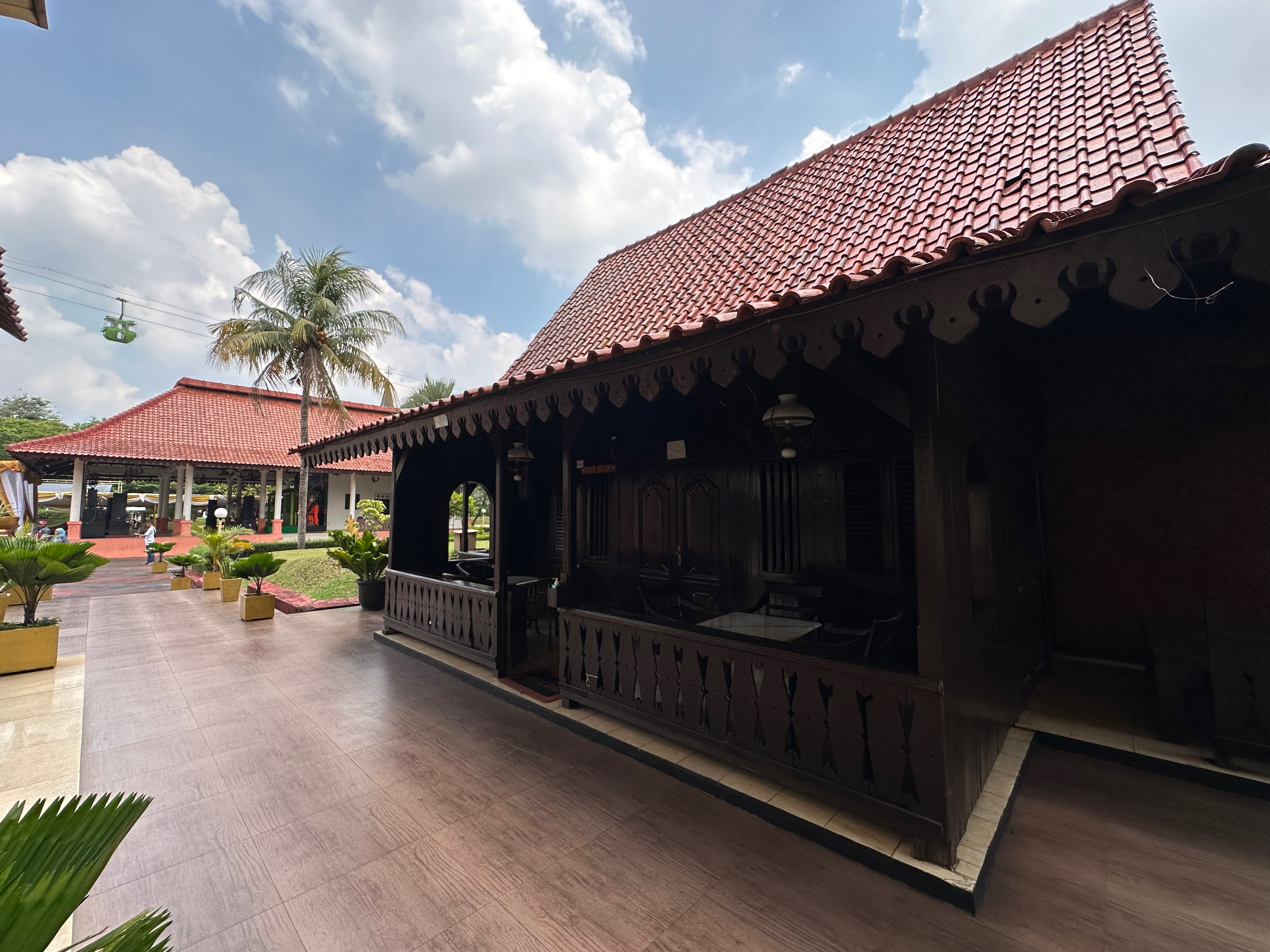
Rumah Kebaya built with Betawi architecture at Taman Mini Indonesia Indah

Jakarta's built environment includes Betawi vernacular architecture, colonial-era buildings, post-independence monuments and modern high-rises. Betawi houses are rooted in Malay architectural traditions, with decorative influences from Chinese, Dutch, Portuguese and Arab cultures. Their wide eaves, large openings, and open layouts are also suited to the tropical climate.

Jakarta's colonial architecture developed from the VOC-built core of Batavia through the 19th-century expansion to Weltevreden and further growth in the early 20th century. By the mid-19th century, Weltevreden had become the colonial administrative centre, with government buildings, elite residences, churches, shops and hotels.

In the early 20th century, planned neighbourhoods such as Menteng combined garden-city layouts with houses adapted to tropical conditions. Developed in the 1910s, Menteng was planned as a healthy residential district for the middle class. The early houses combined climate-adapted features such as broad eaves and open ventilation with modernist and Art Deco design.

After independence, Indonesia's first President Sukarno used major public works as part of nation-building, including the National Monument, the Senayan sports complex, and new major roads. The national legislative complex began as the CONEFO project in 1965. Its main Nusantara Building features a dome formed from two curved sections. From the late 20th century onward, high-rise development increasingly altered Jakarta's skyline, especially the Golden Triangle.

=== Parks and public spaces ===
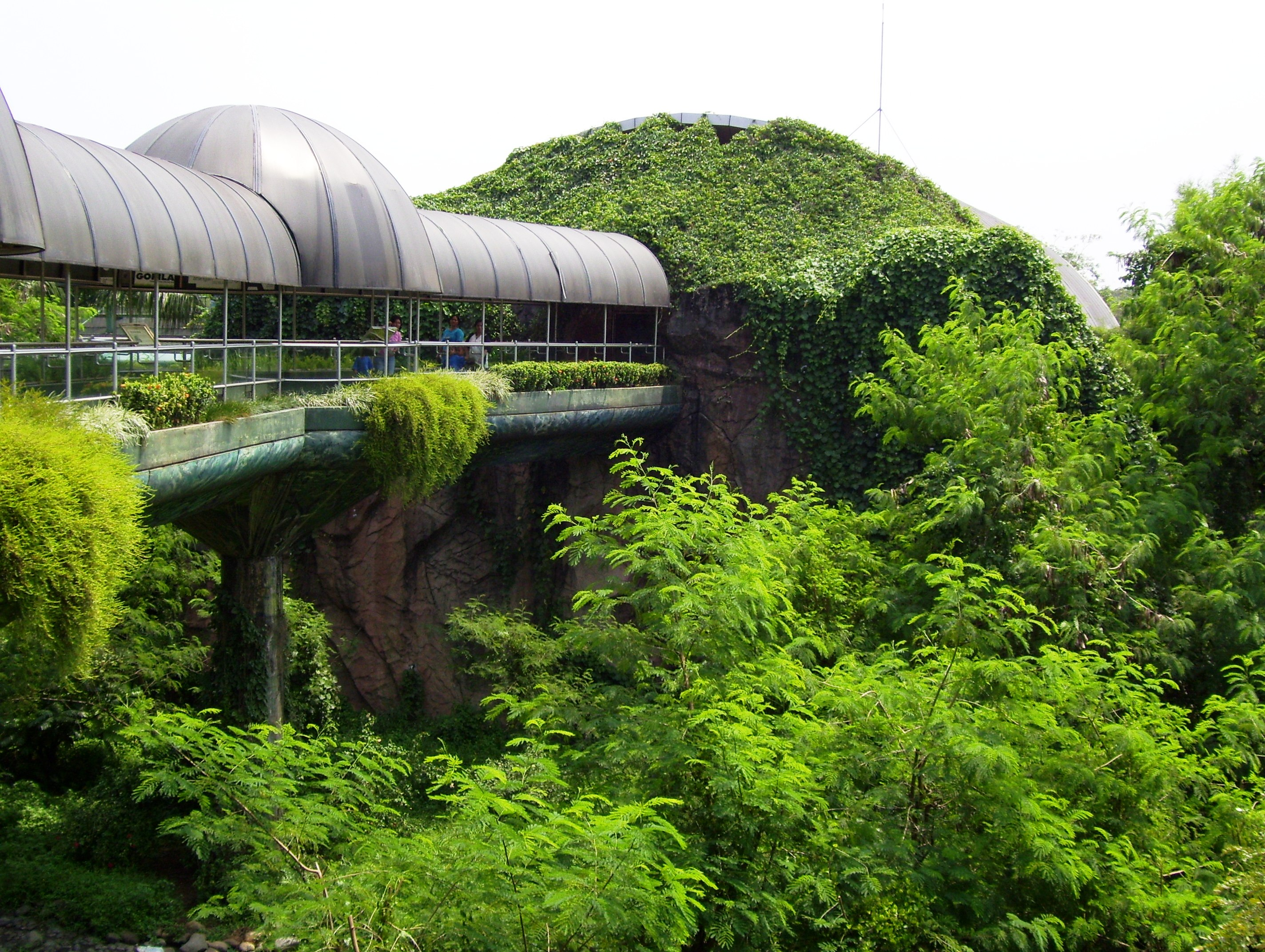
Ragunan Zoo in southern Jakarta, one of the city's major green and recreational areas.

Public parks and green open spaces occupy a limited share of Jakarta's land area. Green open space (ruang terbuka hijau, RTH) covered about 5.18% of Jakarta in 2023, well below the 30% minimum set by national spatial-planning law. Since 2015, the city has also developed child-friendly integrated public spaces (ruang publik terpadu ramah anak, RPTRA), neighbourhood facilities intended for play, social activity, and community use.

Merdeka Square (Medan Merdeka) in Central Jakarta surrounds the National Monument (Monas). Formerly the colonial Koningsplein (King's Square) in Weltevreden, it is now a government-managed public green space used for leisure, sport, and political activities. Nearby Lapangan Banteng, beside Istiqlal Mosque and Jakarta Cathedral, contains the West Irian Liberation Monument and is used for both commemorative and everyday activities.

Other public spaces include Suropati Park and Menteng Park in Menteng, while Kalijodo Park has been redeveloped as green and child-friendly public space. Larger recreational sites include Ancol Dreamland, Ragunan Zoo, and Taman Mini Indonesia Indah, which was conceived as a cultural showcase of Indonesia's diversity.

== Demographics ==
Historical population
Year	Pop.	±%
1945	847,483	—
1950	1,432,052	+69.0%
1961	2,973,052	+107.6%
1971	4,579,303	+54.0%
1980	6,503,449	+42.0%
1990	8,259,266	+27.0%
2000	8,389,443	+1.6%
2010	9,607,787	+14.5%
2020	10,562,088	+9.9%
Note: The 1945 and 1950 population totals are cited in Twang (1987) and the Trade, Industrial & Tourism Directory (1969). The 1961 and 2020 totals are from the national censuses conducted in both years, while the 1971–2010 figures are drawn from Statistics Indonesia. Source:

Migration has been an important source of Jakarta's population growth. Jakarta experienced substantial migration after Indonesian independence in 1945 and has drawn people from across the Indonesian archipelago, including many seeking work. In 1961, 51% of Jakarta's population had been born in the city, while 46.7% had been born in other Indonesian provinces.

Population estimates for Jakarta vary according to the boundaries used. In the first half of 2025, Jakarta's civil-registration records counted 11,010,514 people registered at addresses within the province. The United Nations, using its Degree of Urbanization definition, estimated the population of Jakarta's wider urban area at 41.9 million in 2025. Urban growth has also spread into Jakarta's suburbs, including Bogor, Bekasi, and Tangerang.

=== Ethnicity ===
In the 2010 Indonesian census, no ethnic group made up a majority of Jakarta's Indonesian citizens. Javanese were the largest group, followed by Betawi, Sundanese, and Chinese Indonesians. Batak, Minangkabau, Malay, and other groups were also recorded. Migration from other parts of Indonesia has contributed to Jakarta's ethnic composition. Among the larger groups, Chinese Indonesians have a long-established presence in Jakarta, dating back to colonial Batavia.

The Betawi people are regarded as Jakarta's indigenous ethnic group, but the community itself formed in colonial Batavia from people of varied origins. Early Batavia's population came from many parts of Asia and the Indonesian archipelago. Everyday contact across ethnic lines, including intermarriage, helped forge a shared Betawi identity. Islam was also an important bond across these groups. Today, Betawi communities live in central and peripheral parts of Jakarta and in nearby Bekasi and Tangerang.

=== Language ===
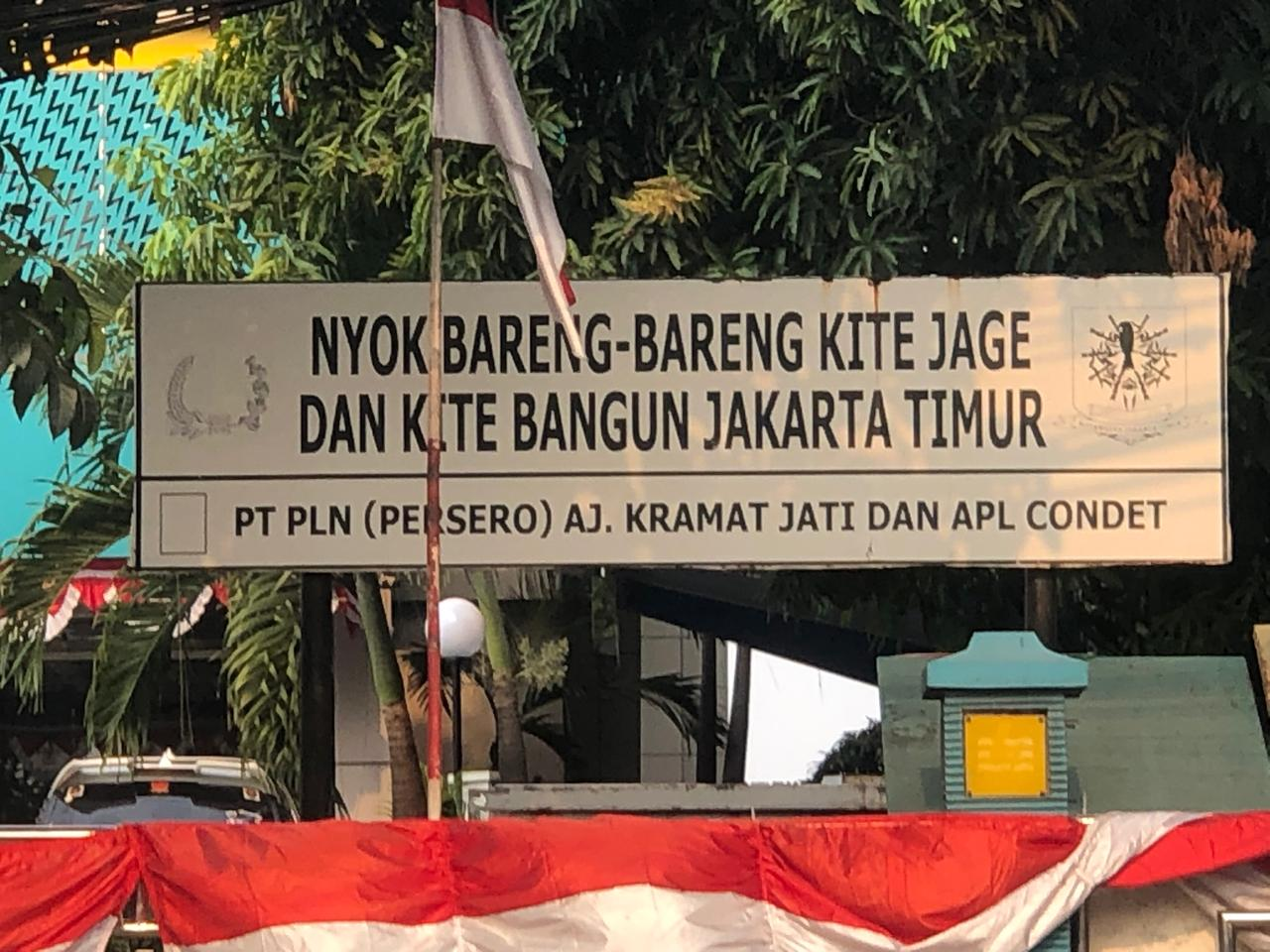
A sign encouraging development in East Jakarta written in the Betawi language.

The Indonesian language is widely spoken across Jakarta, as it is the national and official language of Indonesia. It is also a language of wider communication across ethnic groups. The Betawi language embodies Jakarta's long history of contact among different cultural groups. Betawi Malay and colloquial Jakartan Indonesian are distinct varieties. The latter has been strongly influenced by Betawi Malay and has spread beyond Jakarta.

Some Jakarta communities continue to use regional languages in family and social settings, including Toba Batak and Minangkabau. Among young Chinese Indonesians surveyed in West and North Jakarta, everyday family language use has shifted toward Indonesian, while Chinese heritage languages are maintained unevenly across households.

=== Education ===
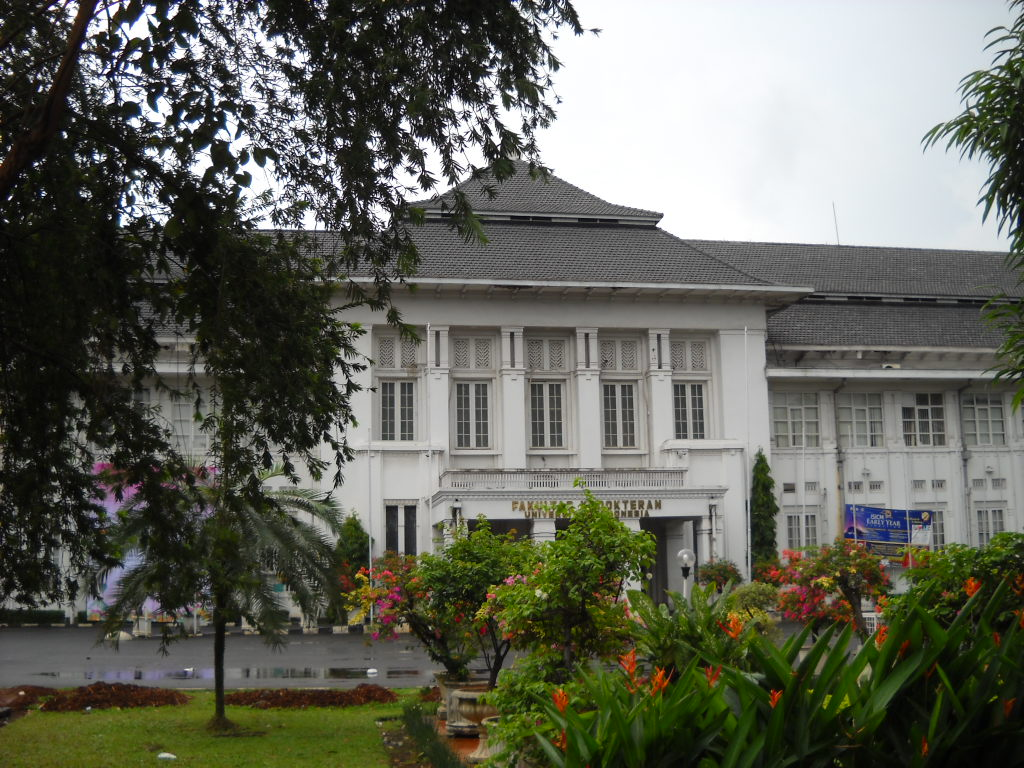
The University of Indonesia's Faculty of Medicine occupies a former colonial medical school building in Salemba.

Jakarta and its surrounding metropolitan area are home to several major public universities, including the University of Indonesia, the State University of Jakarta, and Syarif Hidayatullah State Islamic University Jakarta. The city also has a large private higher-education sector, and the provincial government's list of international schools includes Jakarta Intercultural School and Australian Independent School.

Formal medical training in Batavia began in 1851 with a two-year course preparing young Javanese men for vaccination work. The programme grew in length and scope over time. The STOVIA (Dutch: School tot Opleiding van Indische Artsen, lit. 'school for the training of native physicians'), a colonial medical school, moved to Salemba, Weltevreden, in 1919, and the higher-level Batavia Medical School began admitting students in 1927.

Jakarta is one of Indonesia's largest higher-education centres. In 2025, 241 institutions under the Ministry of Higher Education, Science and Technology enrolled 799,378 students. School participation, including non-formal equivalents, was nearly universal among 7–12- and 13–15-year-olds, but fell to just under nine in ten among 16–18-year-olds. The city has a programme called Jakarta Smart Card (KJP), which is intended to help students from low-income families complete compulsory schooling.

=== Religion ===
Istiqlal Mosque is the largest mosque in Southeast Asia.

According to 2025 data from the Ministry of Religious Affairs, most of Jakarta's population were Muslims (83.85%), followed by Christians (12.51%). Smaller religious communities included Buddhists, Hindus and Confucians.

Several national Islamic organisations have offices in Jakarta. The Indonesian Ulema Council (MUI) and Nahdlatul Ulama's central board (PBNU) are based in Central Jakarta. Muhammadiyah is formally based in Yogyakarta, but its central leadership operates from offices in both Yogyakarta and Jakarta. The Roman Catholic Archdiocese of Jakarta is a metropolitan archdiocese with Bandung and Bogor as its suffragan dioceses.

Istiqlal Mosque, the largest mosque in Southeast Asia, stands opposite Jakarta Cathedral, and their proximity has long been presented as a symbol of interfaith tolerance. During Friday prayers, large congregations sometimes extend beyond mosques into nearby areas. In addition, during major religious holidays, shopping malls often display temporary Eid al-Fitr- and Christmas-themed decorations.

== Economy ==
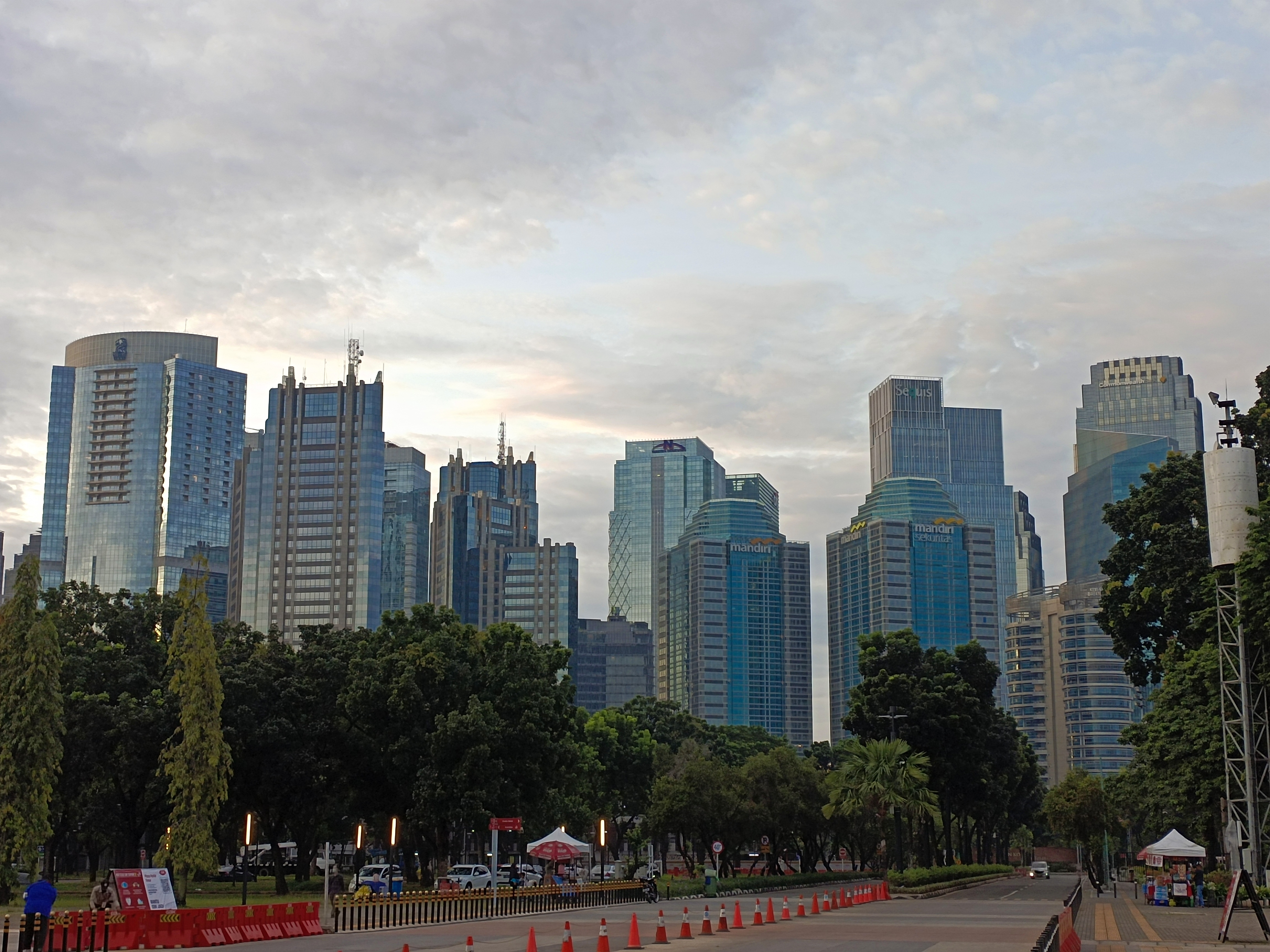
The Sudirman Central Business District (SCBD) is a prominent business centre in Jakarta.

Under Jakarta's 2024 special-region law, the city's post-capital-transfer role is defined as a national economic centre and global city, with activities spanning trade, services, finance, and national, regional, and global business. The economic significance of Jakarta developed over centuries, from Sunda Kelapa's role as a trading port to Batavia's commercial activities, and later to the place of the wider metropolitan area in national and global economic networks.

In 2024, Jakarta's GRDP was Rp 3,679.36 trillion at current prices, while real economic output grew by 4.90% from 2023. Wholesale and retail trade, including motor-vehicle and motorcycle repair, accounted for 18.01% of Jakarta's economy in 2024, the largest industry share, while household consumption accounted for 62.03% on the expenditure side. Jakarta recorded Rp 241.9 trillion in realised investment in the same year, the second-largest provincial total in Indonesia.

Services dominate Jakarta's economy. The city is Indonesia's financial and trade centre, and the wider metropolitan area is a prime location for specialised business services. Global firms in these services generally base their Indonesian headquarters or representative offices in Jakarta, and the metropolitan area also hosts many headquarters of large domestic and multinational companies. The city is also a centre of national administration, concentrated around the Medan Merdeka-Gambir area. Jakarta is the economic centre of the wider metropolitan area. The region had approximately 4.4 million commuters in 2023, of whom 81.9% travelled for work.

=== Shopping ===
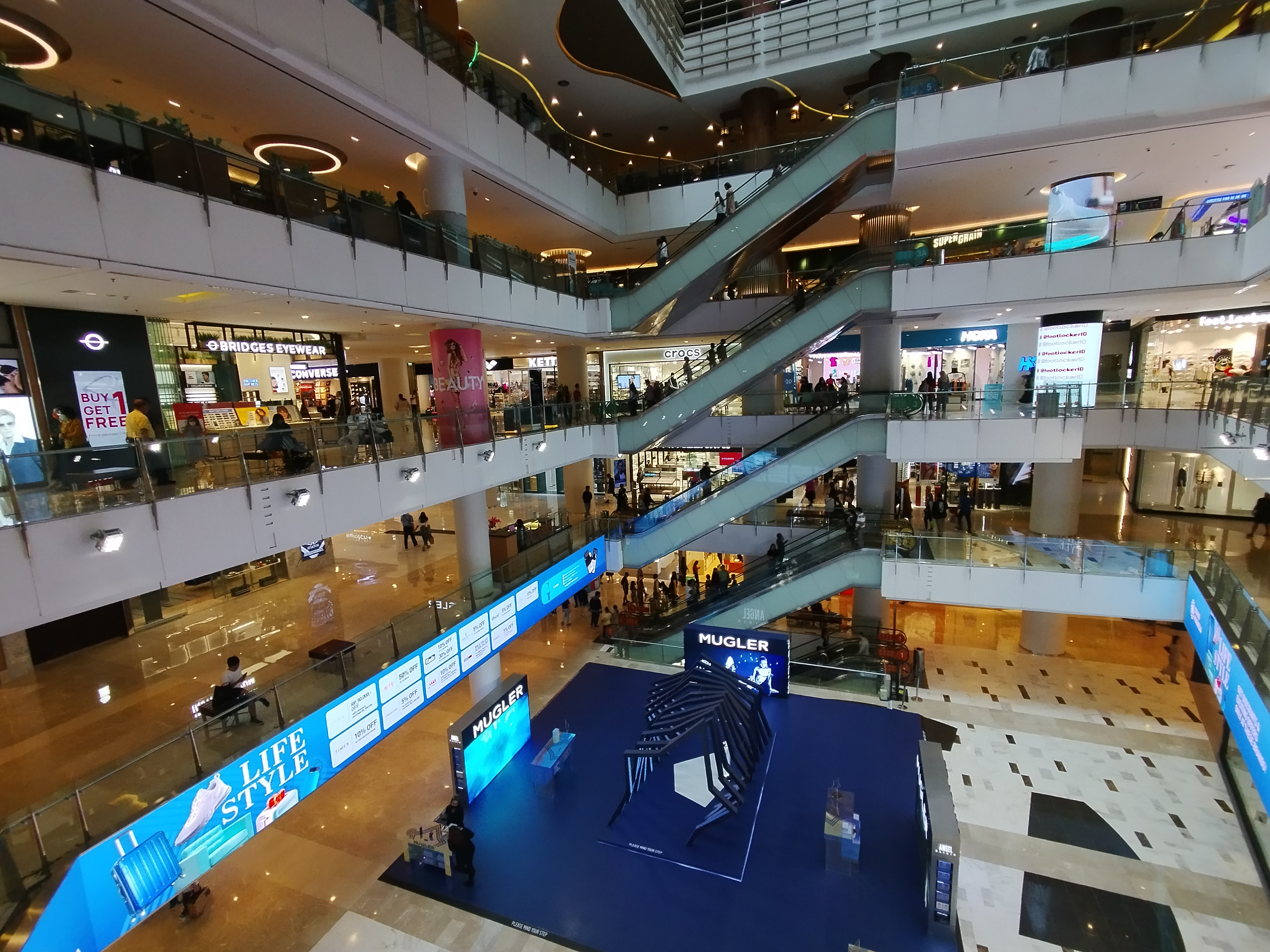
Grand Indonesia shopping mall.

Jakarta has a large retail sector, with modern shopping centres operating alongside traditional markets. In late 2024, Jakarta had about 4.81 million square metres of shopping-centre retail space. Grand Indonesia and Plaza Indonesia are among Jakarta's high-end shopping centres. Beyond shopping, Jakarta's malls are also used as air-conditioned social and leisure spaces, partly substituting for scarce public space. However, access to these privately controlled spaces is unequal.

Traditional markets (pasar) are also a part of the city's retail life. Examples include Tanah Abang, a major centre for wholesale textile trade, and Glodok, where shops and markets are part of the area's Chinese Indonesian urban character. Pasar Baru is a historic commercial district with a multicultural character, known for fashion and clothing, footwear and bags, textile and tailoring businesses, and jewellery.

=== Tourism ===
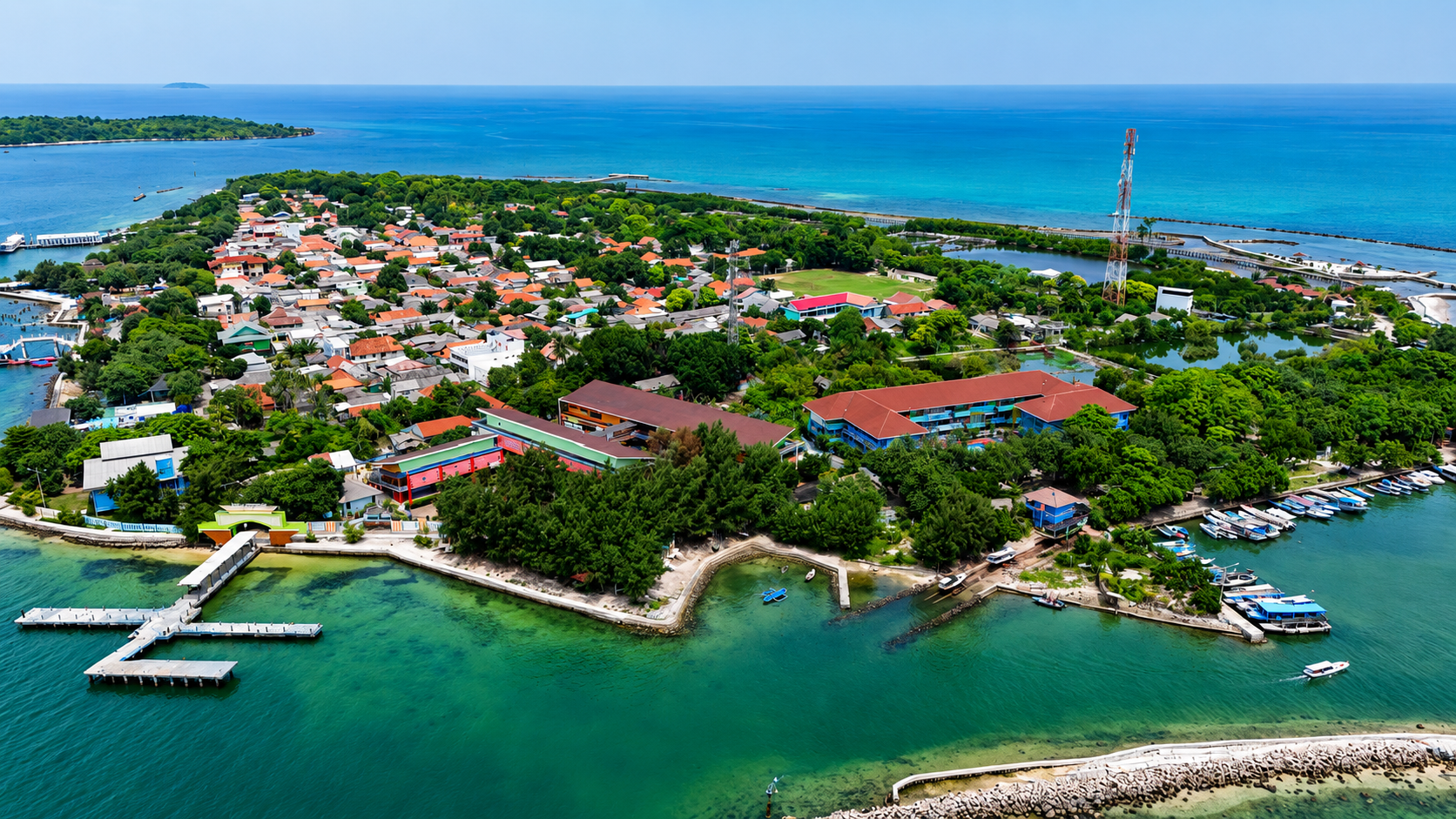
Untung Jawa Island, part of the Thousand Islands north of Jakarta's coast.

Jakarta is one of Indonesia's busiest entry points for foreign tourists. In 2024, it recorded about 2.5 million international tourist visits, representing 18.2% of Indonesia's total. In the first quarter of 2025, Jakarta recorded about 23.2 million domestic tourist trips. Input-output analysis found that tourism-related demand affects economic output, household income and employment, with transport and warehousing, accommodation and food services, and information and communication showing some of the largest multiplier effects.

Many foreign visitors arrive in Jakarta for business or transit. Shopping centres are also part of Jakarta's urban tourism, with some combining retail with green space, galleries, events and other leisure facilities. Tourist attractions include the National Monument (Monas), the Jakarta Old Town (Kota Tua), and Sunda Kelapa harbour. The 132-metre Monas in Merdeka Square commemorates Indonesia's struggle for independence and has an observation deck overlooking the city. Kota Tua preserves elements of colonial Batavia, including canals, former VOC warehouses and the old Town Hall. To the north, the historic Sunda Kelapa harbour is still used by traditional inter-island vessels.

== Culture ==
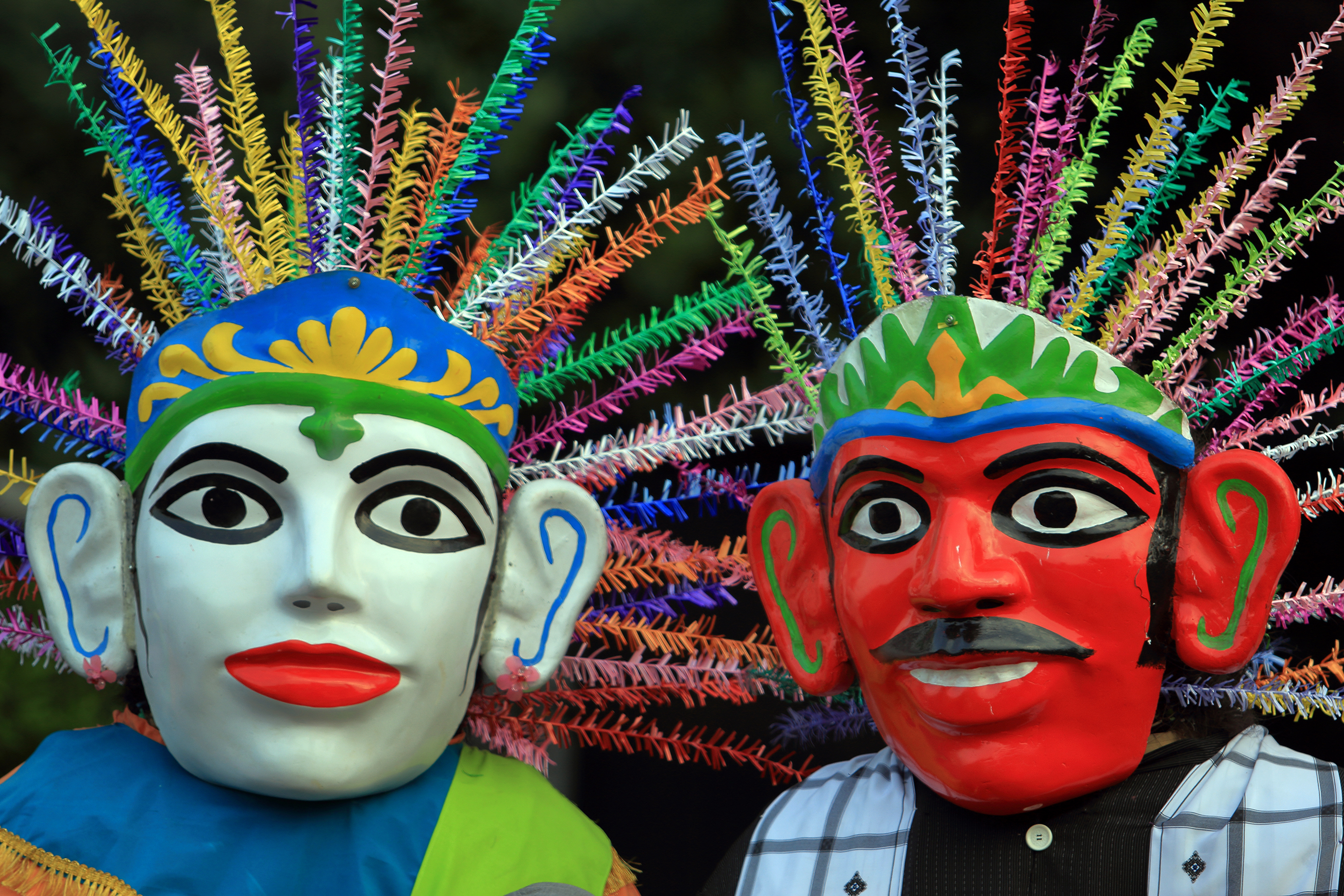
Ondel-ondel, a large traditional puppet and a symbol of Betawi culture.

Jakarta's cultural life showcases a population influenced by long-standing migration from across Indonesia. Betawi traditions are part of local culture, along with cultural practices of communities from other parts of Indonesia.

=== Arts and festivals ===
Betawi performing arts include traditions such as the musical ensemble tanjidor, the traditional theatre of lenong, and ondel-ondel puppet figures. Lebaran Betawi is held as a public celebration and educational event intended to introduce and preserve Betawi culture. Condet in East Jakarta was designated a Betawi cultural heritage area in 1976, but the designation was revoked in 1988. More recent plans have again promoted Betawi cultural activities there.

Wayang orang Bharata stages regular performances at the Bharata Purwa theatre in Senen, while Aula Simfonia Jakarta is a major venue for orchestral and Western classical music and is regularly used by professional ensembles. Taman Ismail Marzuki in Menteng hosts art exhibitions, dance and music performances, cultural programmes, and astronomy activities linked to the Jakarta Planetarium. Jakarta also hosts recurring cultural events, such as Jakarta Fashion Week and the Java Jazz Festival. International cultural institutions in the city include the Japan Foundation's Jakarta centre and Erasmus Huis, the Netherlands' cultural centre.

=== Cuisine ===
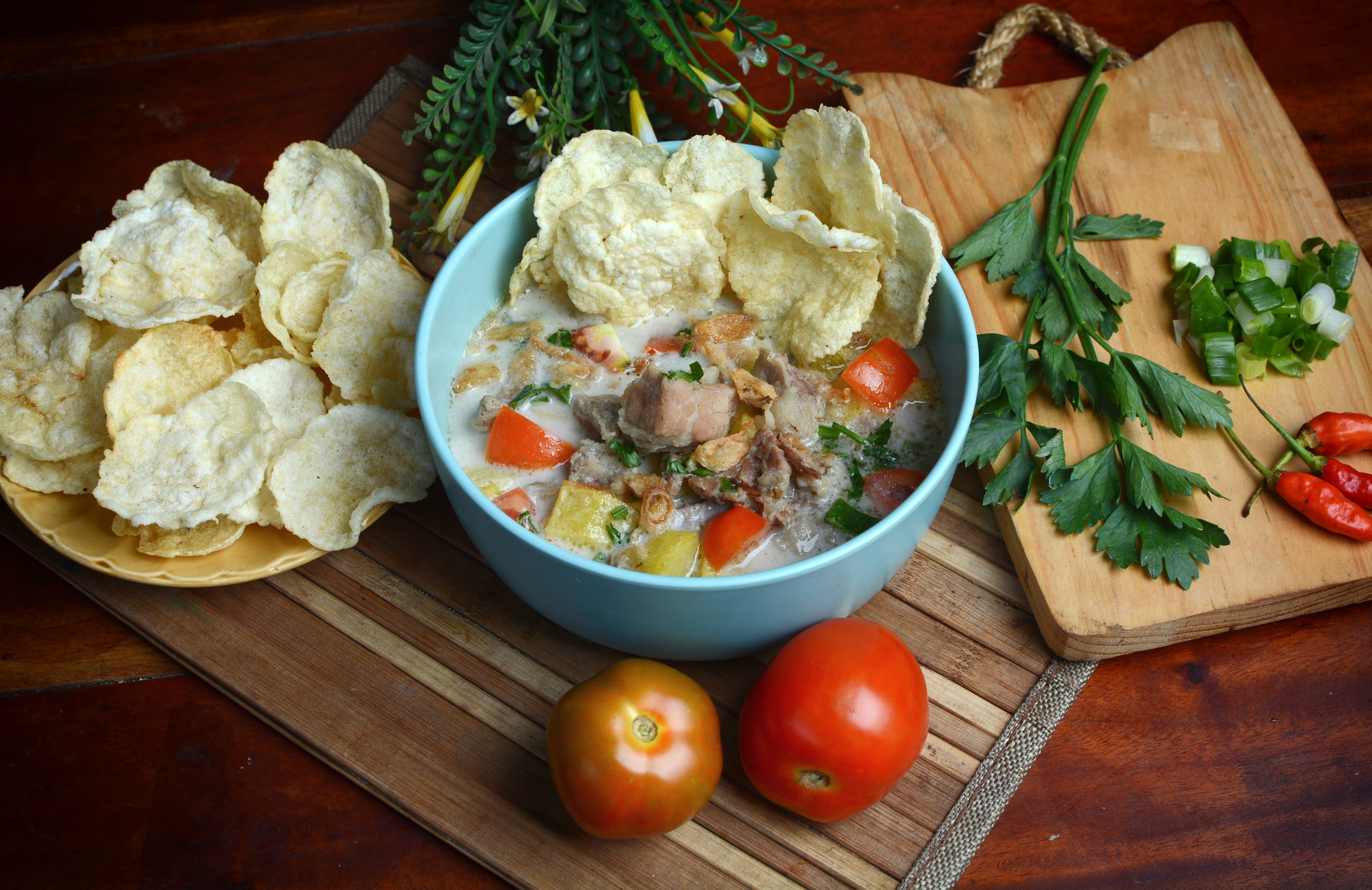
Soto Betawi, a Jakarta-area variant of soto.

Betawi cuisine draws on cultural influences from other parts of the archipelago and from overseas, including Malay, Chinese, Arab, Portuguese, and Dutch traditions. A popular local dish is Soto Betawi, a Jakarta-area soup made with beef and offal in a broth containing coconut milk or cow's milk.

Wartegs are one prevalent example of a street-side eatery, as they serve simple, inexpensive meals to a wide range of Jakarta residents and workers. Several districts are known for concentrations of food vendors and restaurants. The Blok M area has developed into a popular culinary destination, particularly among younger visitors, while in Glodok, Chinese and traditional foods are part of Chinatown's appeal as a culinary destination.

=== Sports ===
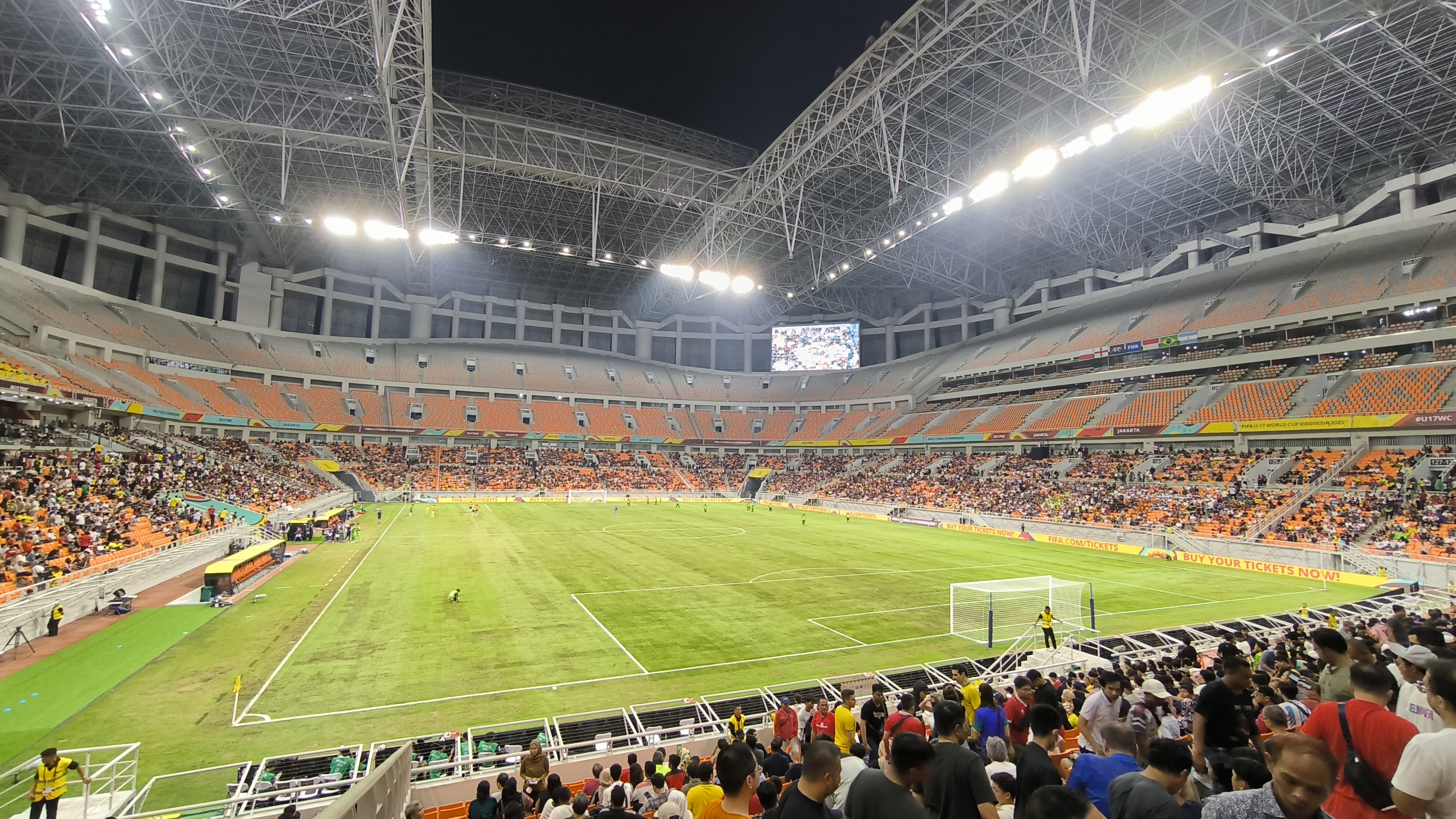
The Jakarta International Stadium in Tanjung Priok, North Jakarta. With a seating capacity of 82,000, it is Indonesia's biggest stadium.

Jakarta hosted the fourth Asian Games in 1962 and co-hosted the 2018 edition with Palembang. The Gelora Bung Karno Stadium was also one of the venues for the 2007 AFC Asian Cup. The larger Gelora Bung Karno complex also contains an aquatic stadium, Istora indoor arena, tennis venues, football fields, and other sports facilities. Other major venues include the Jakarta International Stadium, a retractable-roof football stadium inaugurated in 2022, and the Jakarta International Velodrome in Rawamangun, which was used for the 2018 Asian Games.

Jakarta residents also use streets and public spaces for exercise and organised events. During Jakarta Car-Free Day, sections of Sudirman and Thamrin are closed to motor traffic and used for exercise and family activities, and the Jakarta Marathon has been held since 2013. The city has also hosted international motorsport, including the first Jakarta ePrix that was held in 2022 at the Jakarta International e-Prix Circuit at Ancol Beach.

=== Media and entertainment ===
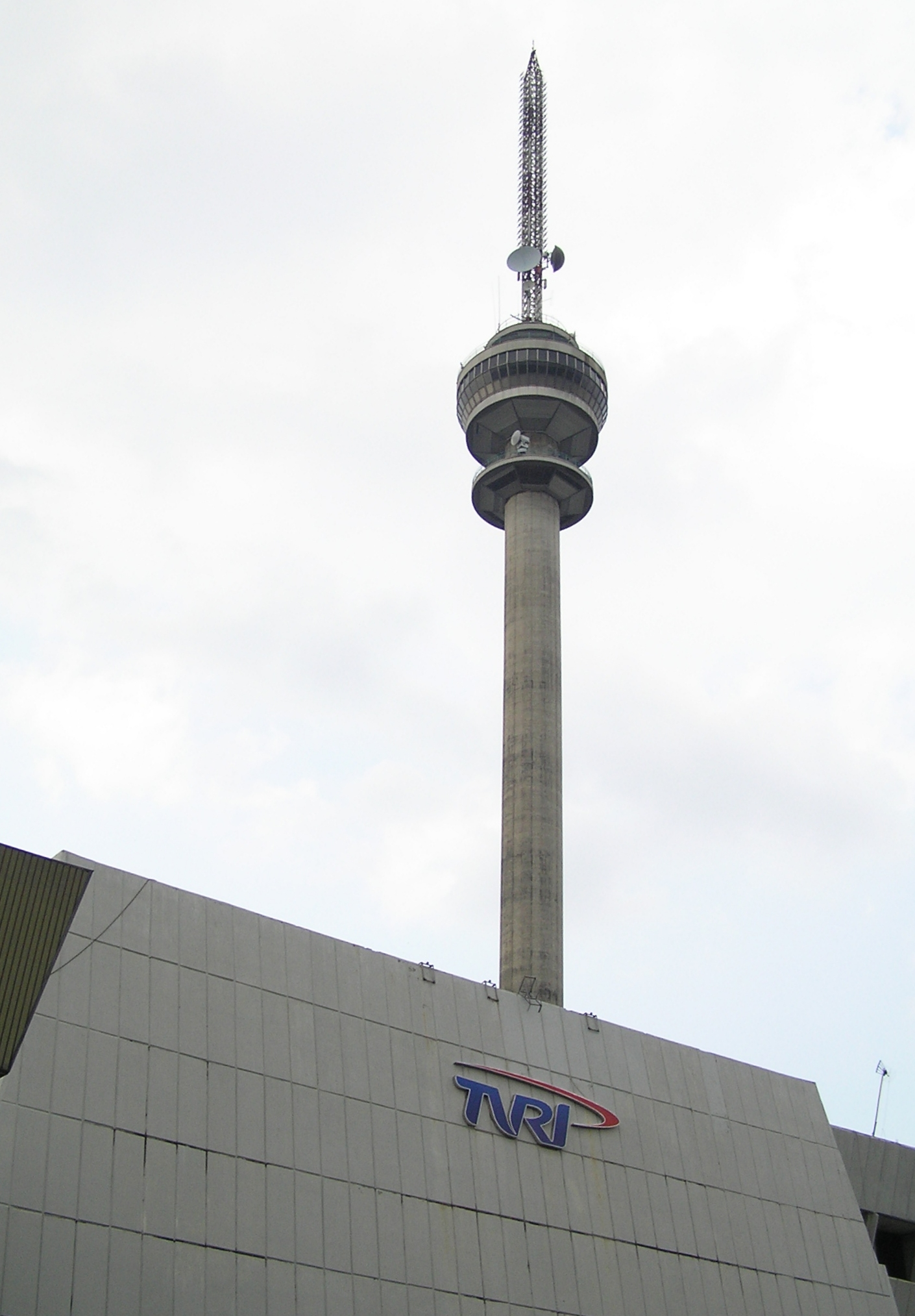
The main TV tower of TVRI at its headquarters in Jakarta.

Printed news in Jakarta dates back to colonial Batavia, where Bataviase Nouvelles first appeared in 1744 and seem to have circulated mainly among VOC employees and Europeans. Jakarta is home to the headquarters of most kinds of Indonesian media organisation. The concentration differs by sector, with television ownership focused particularly in the capital and radio and newspaper ownership more concentrated in Java generally. Reforms after 1998 expanded the broadcasting system to include public and community media along with commercial outlets, but large private groups based in Jakarta remained dominant.

Around 70% of Indonesia's cinema industry is concentrated in the metropolitan area, where much of the country's filmmaking and editing equipment is concentrated. The local film ecosystem includes the Jakarta Film Week and Producer Lab, a government-supported programme for Indonesian film producers. Jakarta is also a major publishing centre, with about 25% of Indonesia's publishers based in the city. Concerts by Indonesian and international artists are held at venues across the metropolitan area, including the Gelora Bung Karno Stadium in Jakarta and the Indonesia Convention Exhibition (ICE) in Tangerang.

== Government and politics ==
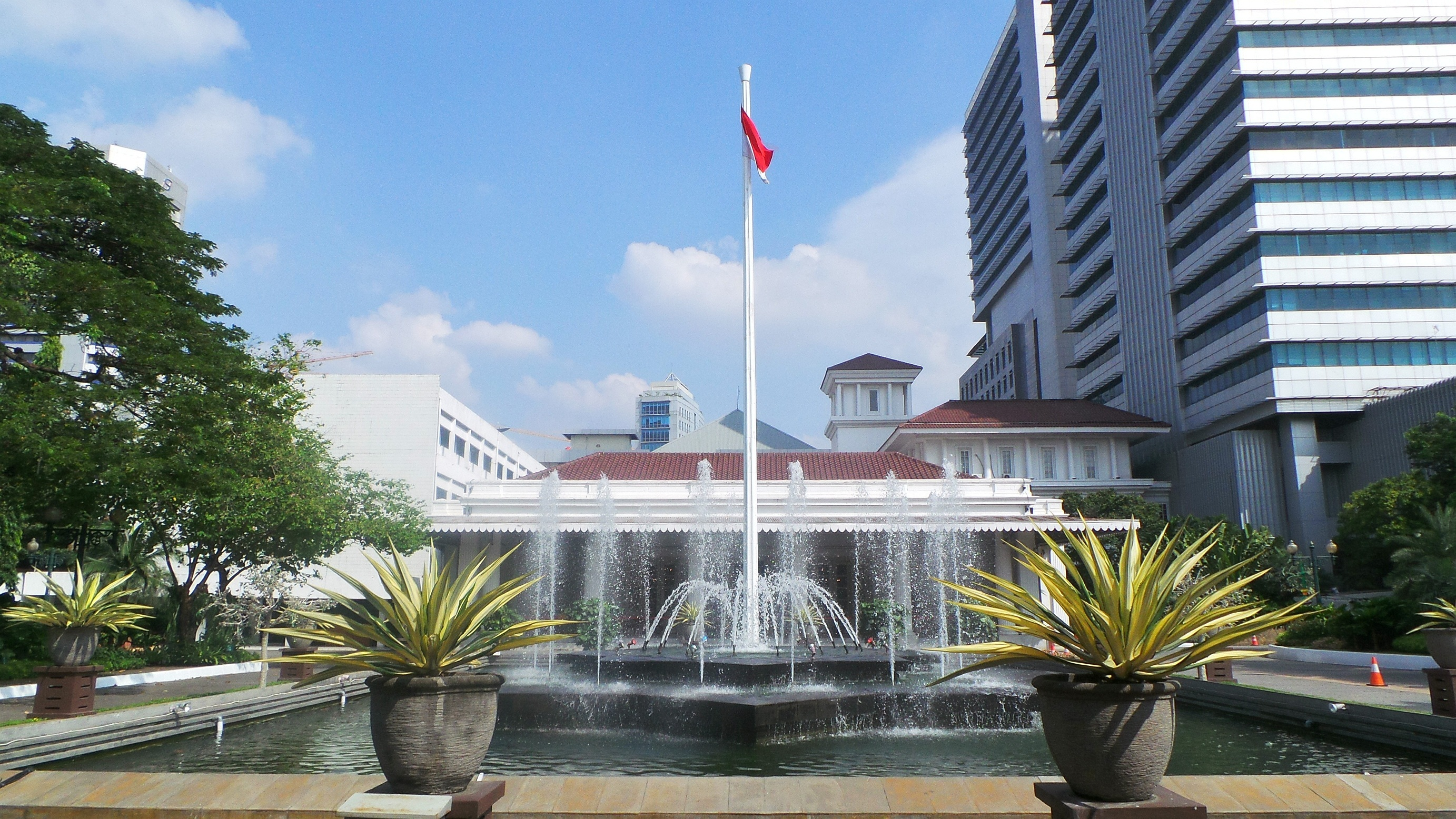
The Jakarta City Hall

Jakarta is an autonomous region at the provincial level, governed under special legislation. Formerly a municipality of the West Java province, Jakarta became a "first-level region" (Daerah Tingkat I) in 1957, and later acquired the status of a Special Capital Region (Daerah Khusus Ibukota, DKI) in 1961. Under the city's 2024 special-region law, Jakarta remains the national capital until a presidential decree formalises the transfer to Nusantara.

Jakarta's provincial government is headed by a directly elected governor and vice governor, while the Jakarta Regional House of Representatives has legislative, budgetary, and oversight roles. The governor appoints the mayors of Jakarta's administrative cities and the regent of the Thousand Islands, rather than having residents elect them. At the national level, Jakarta elects 21 DPR members from three electoral districts and four DPD members.

The metropolitan area extends beyond Jakarta into West Java and Banten, spanning the jurisdictions of three provinces and 14 city and regency governments. Issues affecting the metro area, including transport, flood control, water resources and waste management, involve authorities across multiple jurisdictions. The 2024 special-region law provides for an agglomeration area in which spatial and development plans are to be synchronised across national ministries and agencies, provinces, and city and regency governments.

Jakarta derives most of its provincial revenue from local sources. In 2024, realised revenue was Rp72.95 trillion, including Rp50.74 trillion in locally generated revenue (pendapatan asli daerah, PAD) and Rp21.62 trillion in transfer revenue. Basic-service functions accounted for 56.33% of provincial spending, with education and health being the largest components. Jakarta also accounted for about half of Indonesia's cumulative subnational borrowing during the 2016–2021 period, with gross cumulative loans of Rp37 trillion.

=== Administrative divisions ===
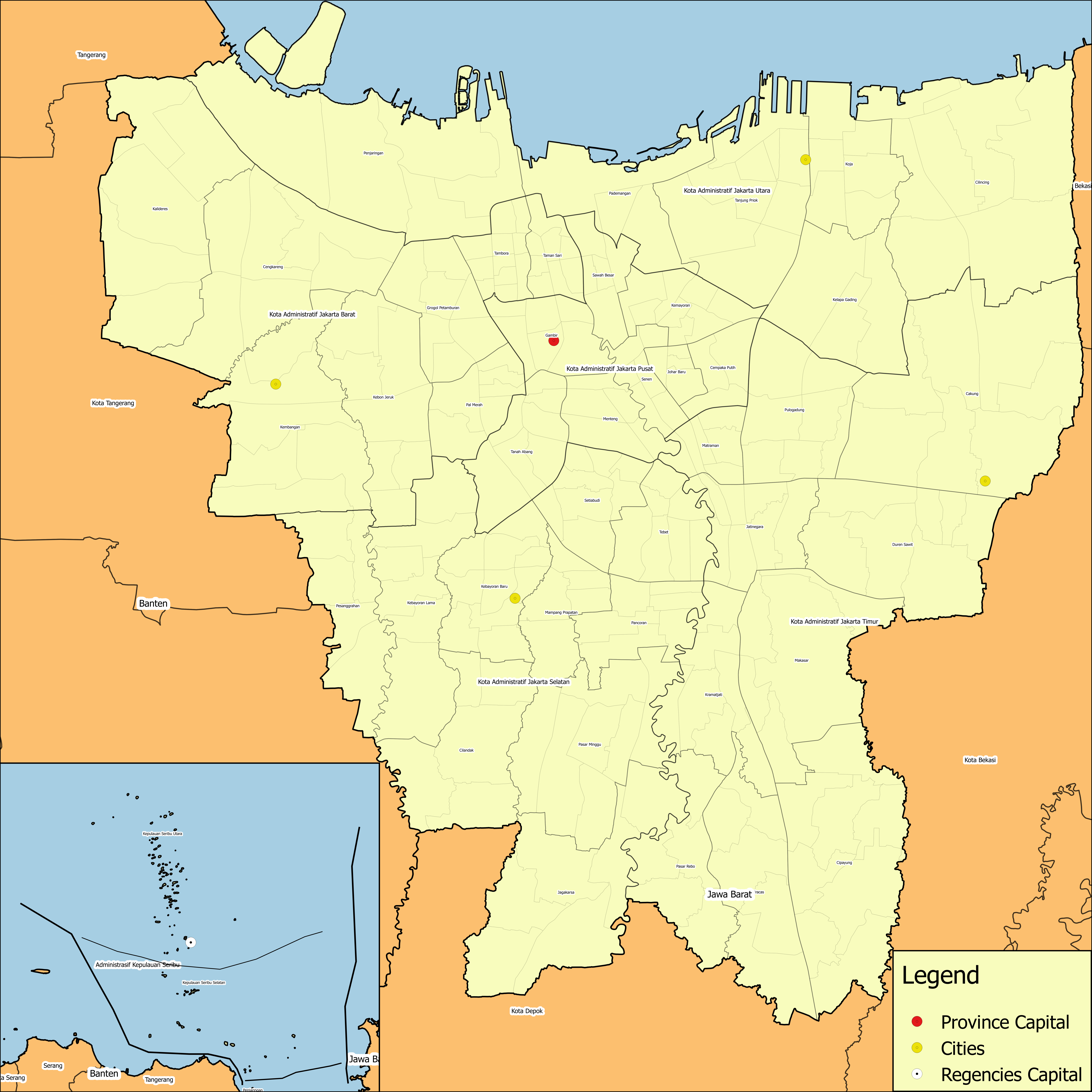
Map of Jakarta's administrative cities, with the Thousand Islands Regency shown in a lower-left inset.

Jakarta is divided into five administrative cities (kota administrasi): Central Jakarta, West Jakarta, South Jakarta, East Jakarta, and North Jakarta, and one administrative regency (kabupaten administrasi): the Thousand Islands. The five administrative cities were established by gubernatorial decree in 1966. In 2001, the Thousand Islands, then part of North Jakarta, was elevated to an administrative regency to improve public services and welfare and the management of the islands.

Each administrative city is headed by a mayor, and the Thousand Islands by a regent. The five cities and the regency are made up of districts (kecamatan). Unlike autonomous cities and regencies elsewhere in Indonesia, Jakarta's administrative cities and regency are non-autonomous parts of the provincial administration. City and regency councils assist their mayors or regent, but the units do not have their own DPRD.

=== Public safety ===
Policing in Jakarta is handled by Greater Jakarta Metropolitan Regional Police (Polda Metro Jaya), the regional police force of the Indonesian National Police. Its jurisdiction covers Jakarta and nearby areas including Depok, Tangerang city and regency, South Tangerang, and Bekasi city and regency. The force is led by a regional police chief with the rank of inspector general.

Jakarta Siaga 112 is a free, 24-hour emergency call service operated by Jakarta's Regional Disaster Management Agency (BPBD). It integrates emergency-call services from provincial agencies, police and other organisations, forwarding reports on fires, medical emergencies, crime, disasters and other incidents to the relevant service.

== Infrastructure ==
=== Transportation ===
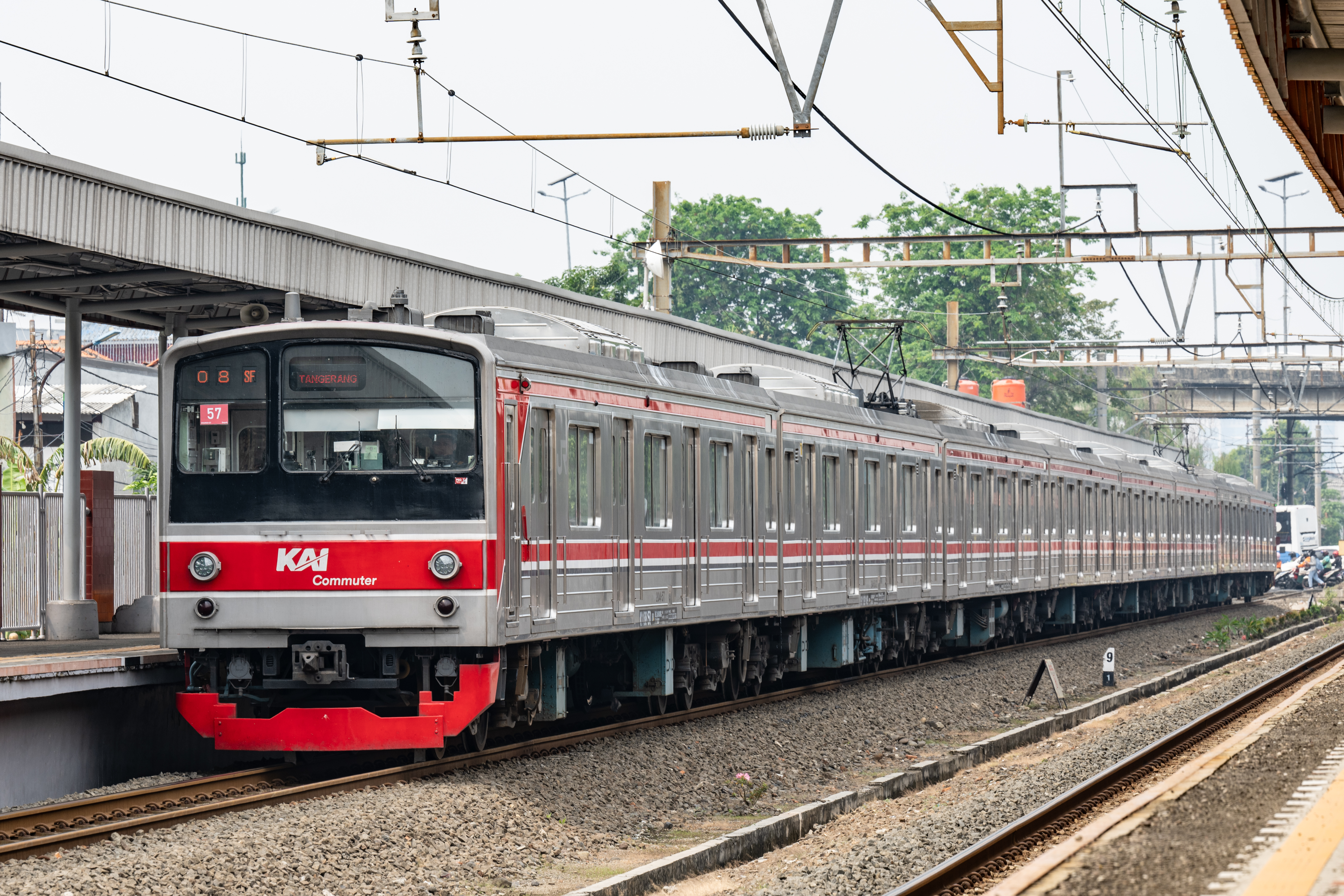
Two examples of public transport in Jakarta, the KRL Commuterline and the Transjakarta bus

The Jakarta metro area is heavily dependent on private road transport and experiences severe traffic congestion. Jakarta is served by the Jakarta Inner Ring Road and Jakarta Outer Ring Road, as well as toll roads linking the city with Tangerang, Cikampek, Bogor and other surrounding areas. To reduce congestion, Jakarta uses an odd-even licence-plate restriction system on 16 main roads.

Jakarta's public transport network includes Transjakarta, the Jakarta MRT, Jakarta LRT, Jabodebek LRT, KRL Commuterline, and the airport rail link. Since 2018, Jakarta has expanded fare and station integration and improved walking and cycling access to public transport. In 2021, Jakarta received the Sustainable Transport Award for work on integrated and resilient transport systems. The wider metropolitan area also has large daily commuter flows between Jakarta and Bogor, Depok, Tangerang, and Bekasi.

The primary airport for the metropolitan area is the Soekarno–Hatta International Airport, while Halim Perdanakusuma also accommodates commercial flights along with military purposes. Port of Tanjung Priok in North Jakarta is Indonesia's largest and busiest port, while the Muara Angke harbour provides boat services to the Thousand Islands.

=== Healthcare ===
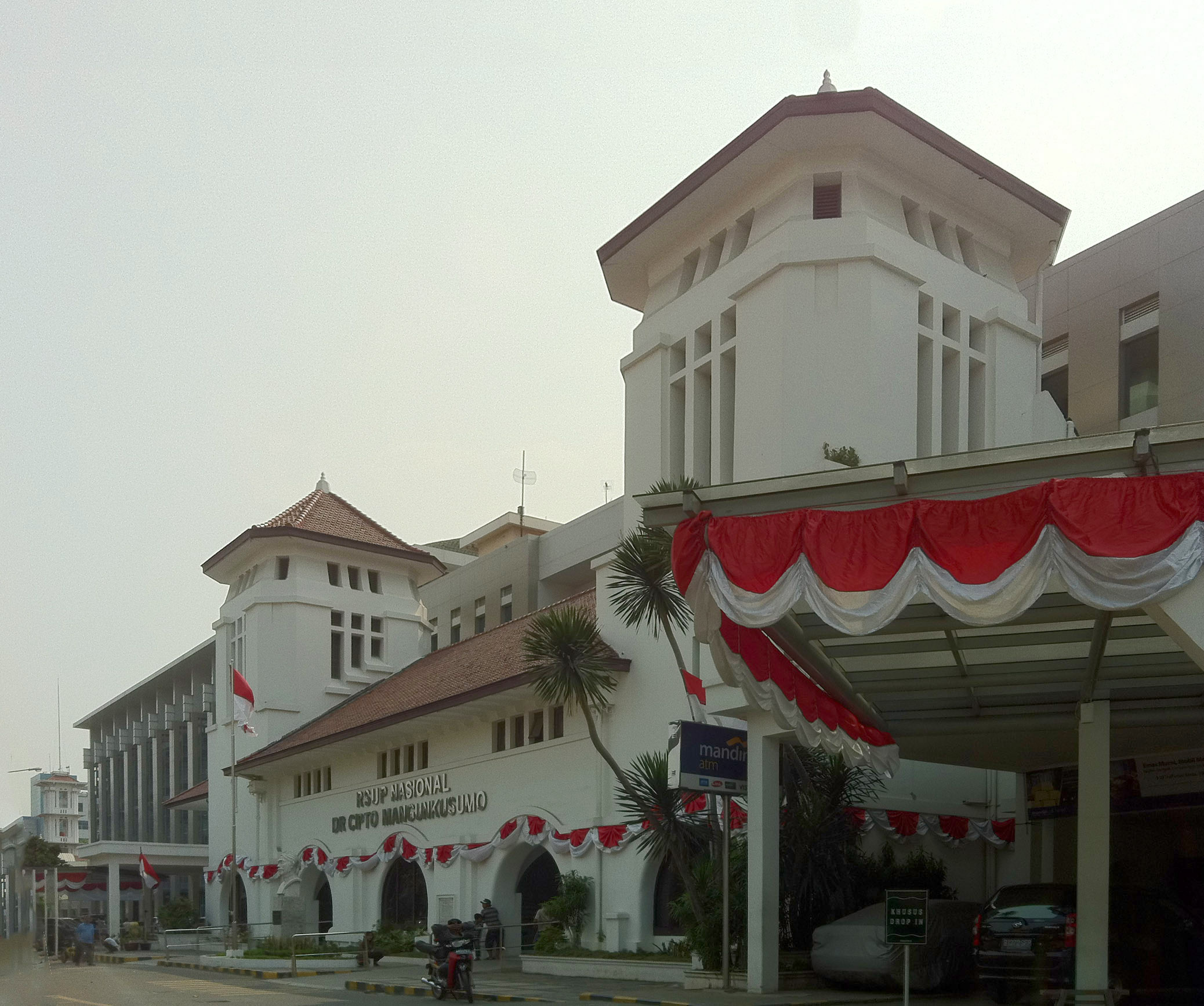
Dr. Cipto Mangunkusumo Hospital in Jakarta

As in other Indonesian provinces, Jakarta's healthcare system includes public and private hospitals, clinics, and community health centres (puskesmas). In late 2012, then governor Joko Widodo introduced the Kartu Jakarta Sehat (Healthy Jakarta Card, KJS), a provincial programme intended to expand access to medical care through public health facilities. The programme merged into the national Jaminan Kesehatan Nasional (JKN) system in January 2014, administered by BPJS Kesehatan. As of 2023, universal health coverage in the city had reached 98.5%.

A 2023 assessment estimated that air pollution in Jakarta contributes annually to more than 10,000 premature deaths and 5,000 hospital admissions, as well as over 7,000 cases of adverse health effects among children. In the 2023 Indonesia Health Survey, 3.9% of residents aged 15 or over had doctor-diagnosed diabetes, the highest provincial rate in the country, while 31.8% of residents aged over 18 were obese.

=== Water supply ===
Jakarta's piped water services are operated by PAM Jaya, a regionally owned public company (BUMD). The West Tarum Canal, which carries water from the Jatiluhur Dam and the Citarum River, supplied about 80% of Jakarta's bulk water as of 2014. In 1997, the city granted two 25-year water-service concessions, assigning the western part of the city to PAM Lyonnaise Jaya and the eastern part to Thames PAM Jaya (renamed Aetra in 2007). This private management ended in 2023 and PAM Jaya resumed full operation from that year.

Piped-water coverage had reached about 82% of Jakarta's population by 2026. Historically, access was uneven, with poorer households facing barriers to direct network connections. Groundwater has long supplied a substantial share of the city's water needs, but heavy extraction is linked to land subsidence and salinisation. Waste-water contamination also affects shallow groundwater. In 2024, non-revenue water, the difference between water distributed and water billed to customers, stood at 46.2%, and the city's reduction programme prioritises rehabilitating ageing distribution pipelines.

=== Sanitation and waste management ===
Jakarta's wastewater strategy combines expansion of the Jakarta Sewerage System with smaller-scale treatment. Other planned measures include modular facilities, additional faecal-sludge processing capacity and communal treatment systems to reduce pollution of surface water and groundwater. Jakarta continues to rely on the Bantar Gebang landfill in Bekasi, which has a capacity of about 6,000 tonnes per day, while the city generates more than 7,000 tonnes of waste daily. Jakarta's waste-reduction programmes include source separation, community waste banks, recycling and composting. A Central Jakarta subdistrict study in 2024 found solid waste clogging drains and causing wastewater overflow, and a blocked drainage contributing to local flooding.

== International relations ==
As Indonesia's capital, Jakarta hosts foreign embassies and the ASEAN Headquarters. Several non-ASEAN countries also maintain ambassadors accredited to ASEAN. Jakarta has been a member of C40 Cities Climate Leadership Group since 2006 and is also a member of the ASEAN Smart Cities Network, a platform for cooperation on smart and sustainable urban development.

=== Twin towns – sister cities ===
Jakarta has established international cooperation agreements with cities and subnational governments, including:

- Arkansas, United States
- Bangkok, Thailand
- Beijing, China
- Berlin, Germany
- Budapest, Hungary
- Casablanca, Morocco
- East Jerusalem, Palestine
- Hanoi, Vietnam
- Islamabad, Pakistan
- Istanbul, Turkey
- Jeddah, Saudi Arabia
- Kyiv, Ukraine
- Los Angeles, United States
- Maputo, Mozambique
- Mumbai, India
- Moscow, Russia
- New South Wales, Australia
- New York, United States
- Paris, France
- Pyongyang, North Korea
- Seoul, South Korea
- Shanghai, China
- Tokyo, Japan

Jakarta also has cooperation arrangements with other cities. It has worked with Rotterdam on urban water management, including capacity-building and knowledge exchange. Jakarta also has a business partnership with Osaka to promote private-sector economic exchanges and help Osaka SMEs explore overseas markets.

== See also ==
- Climate change in Indonesia
- Outline of Jakarta
