= Yusuf Sudirman Traditional House =

- Joglo Yusuf Sudirman
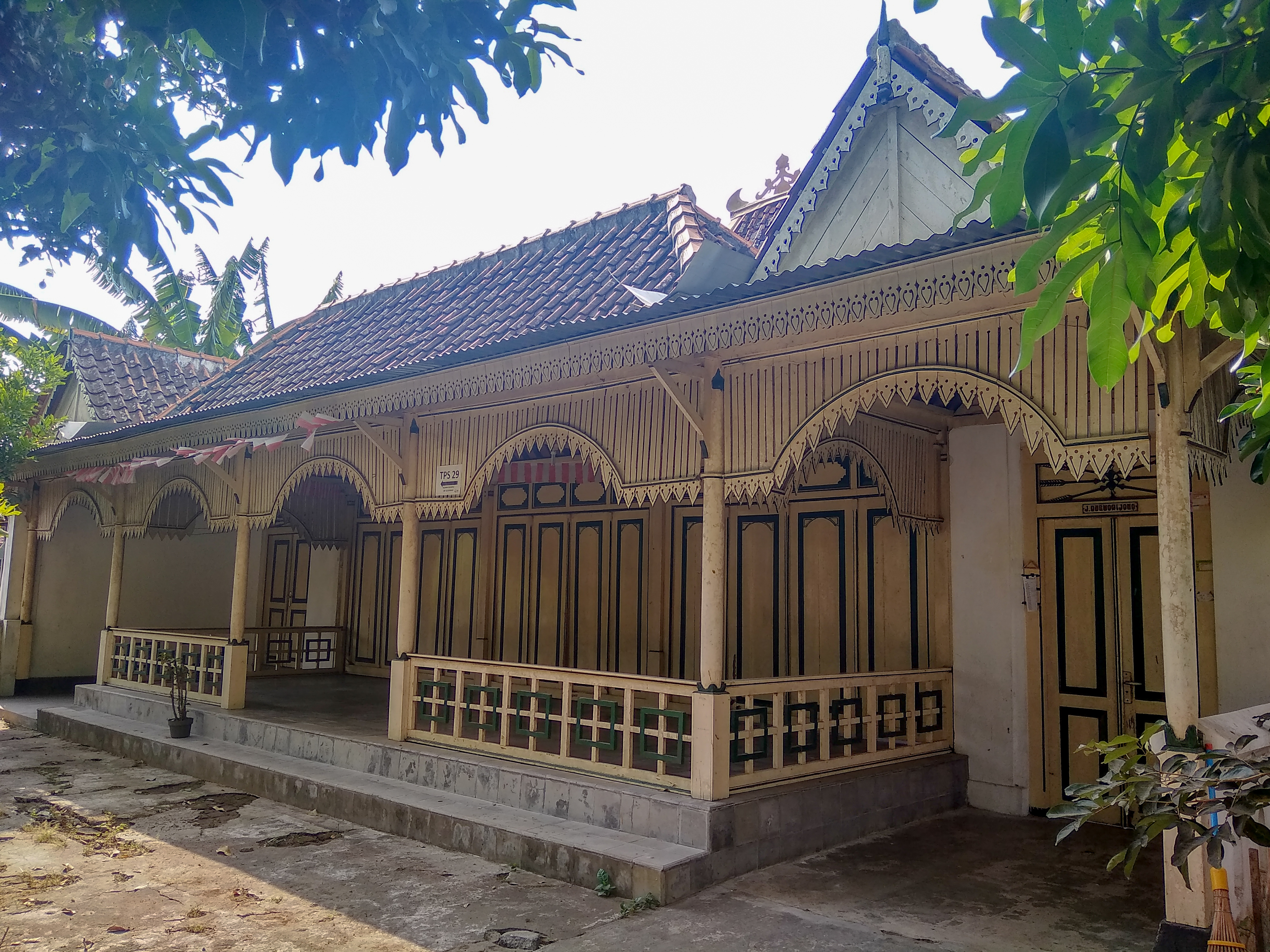

General information
- Architectural style: Joglo
- Location: Kunden Hamlet RT. 05, Jambidan Village, Banguntapan District, Bantul Regency
- Year built: 1918; 108 years ago
- Renovated: 2014; 12 years ago

Yusuf Sudirman Traditional House, also known as Joglo Yusuf Sudirman, is a cultural heritage building located in Kunden Hamlet RT. 05, Jambidan Village, Banguntapan District, Bantul Regency, Special Region of Yogyakarta Province, Indonesia. During the struggle for independence, the house was used as a communal kitchen. Today, it serves as a venue for cultural and artistic activities as well as the residence of Yusuf Sudirman's family. The building was designated as a cultural heritage site through the Decree of the Governor of the Special Region of Yogyakarta No. 210/KEP/2010.

== Condition ==
The joglo-style house was constructed in Kunden Hamlet RT. 05, Jambidan Village, Banguntapan District, Bantul Regency, around 1918 by Pawira Dirja, Yusuf Sudirman's grandfather. During the independence movement, the house functioned as a communal kitchen. The house exhibits traditional Javanese architectural characteristics, including features such as the pendopo (pavilion), teras (porch), longkangan (open courtyard within the house complex), pringgitan (transition area between the pavilion and the main house), dalem ageng (main interior area for special purposes), and senthong (bedrooms).

The building faces south, with a front area comprising gray-colored flooring, wooden fencing, and a roof adorned with rete-rete (decorative roof ornaments resembling downward arrows). On the eastern side of the house is the seketeng (entrance gate), while the main interior features art deco-style iron consoles and pointed lisplang (eaves boards). In addition to being a residence, the house is also used as a venue for cultural activities during bersih desa (village cleansing rituals).

== Cultural heritage designation ==
In 2000, the house received a cultural heritage award from the Government of the Special Region of Yogyakarta. It was officially designated as a cultural heritage site through the Decree of the Governor of the Special Region of Yogyakarta No. 210/KEP/2010. The Cultural Agency of the Special Region of Yogyakarta renovated the house in 2014. On 14 June 2019, during the 106th anniversary of the Antiquities Service, the Yogyakarta Cultural Heritage Preservation Agency (BPCB) awarded the house the "Cultural Heritage Protection Compensation" along with nine other heritage buildings at the Sonobudoyo Museum. This award was part of the “Cultural Heritage Preservation Award” program initiated in 2008.

The program aims to encourage the community, particularly the owners and managers of cultural heritage sites, to actively preserve these cultural treasures and the significant values they embody. Along with nine other buildings, the Yusuf Sudirman Traditional House was deemed deserving of the award based on several criteria:

- Philosophical values reflected in the spatial layout, style, and ornamental elements.
- Authenticity of the building and its surrounding environment in terms of craftsmanship, form, layout, and materials.
- Maintenance and cleanliness of the building and its environment.
- Appropriate utilization and operation of the building according to its function.
- Management and independent funding for preservation, including protection and maintenance efforts.
