= National Library of Indonesia =

Legal deposit library in Jakarta

National Library of the Republic of Indonesia
- Perpustakaan Nasional Republik Indonesia

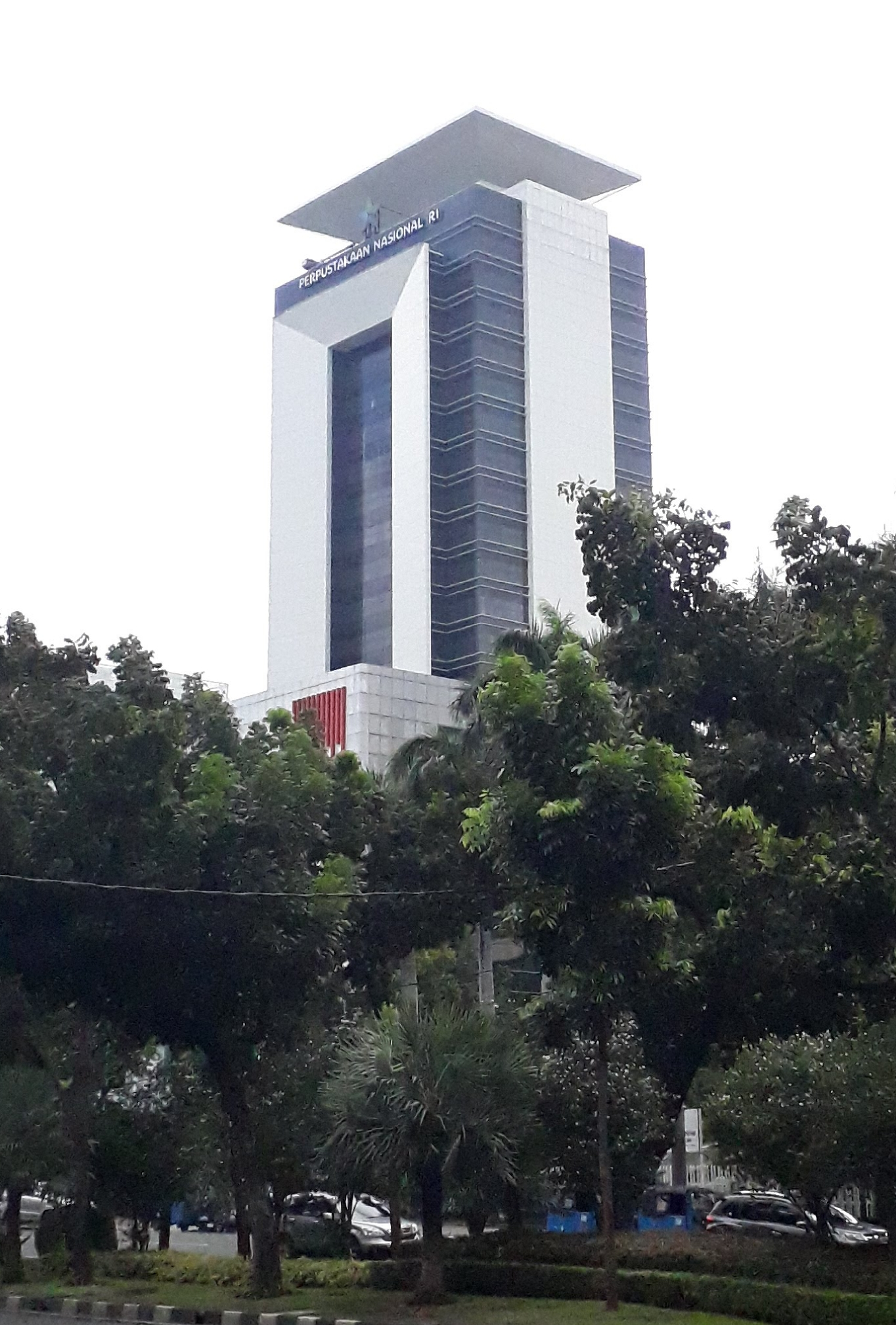
- National Library of Indonesia new building in Central Jakarta, facing Merdeka Square
- 6°11′54.7″S 106°51′7.5″E
- Location: Jakarta, Indonesia
- Established: 17 May 1980 (46 years ago)

Collection
- Size: About 4 million (2017)

Other information
- Director: Endang Aminudin Aziz
- Website: perpusnas.go.id

The National Library of the Republic of Indonesia (Perpusnas, Indonesian: Perpustakaan Nasional Republik Indonesia) is the legal deposit library of Indonesia. It is located at Gambir, on the south side of Merdeka Square, Jakarta. It serves primarily as a humanities library alongside several others holding national responsibilities for science and agriculture. The national library was established in 1980 through a decree of the Ministry of Education and Culture and the consolidation of four different libraries. It maintains the status of a non-departmental government institution and is responsible to the President of Indonesia.

The earliest collections originated from the library of the National Museum, opened in 1868 and formerly operated by the Royal Batavian Society of Arts and Sciences. The previous library building was opened in 1988 with financial support from Tien Suharto. The new 127 metres (417 ft) tall building is claimed to be the tallest library building in the world. It was inaugurated by Indonesian president Joko Widodo on 14 September 2017.

== History ==
=== Origins ===
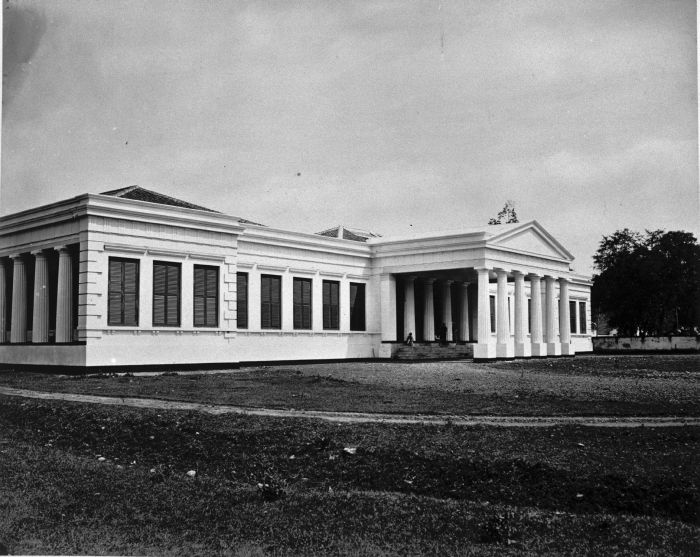
Museum of the Royal Batavian Society of Arts and Sciences, now the National Museum of Indonesia, c. 1875–1885

The origins of the national library date back to the 1778 foundation of the Royal Batavian Society of Arts and Sciences, the first of its kind in Asia. Through its promotion of scholarship in the Dutch East Indies, the society created numerous publications and accumulated a number of collections, including establishing a library. After increasing its collections during the first half of the 19th century, the society and its library moved in 1868 to a new location at the current National Museum at Merdeka Square. Attempts to divert some collections to the new Royal Netherlands Institute of Southeast Asian and Caribbean Studies (KITLV) were resisted by members. Between 1846 and 1920, the library's collection grew from 1,115 items to over 100,000.

The Society's library survived the years of conflict during and following World War II. Japanese forces occupying Indonesia during the war years were impressed by the number of Japanese scholars in the society and did not interfere with the affairs of the museum. Because authorities also upheld the library's powers of legal deposit, it holds a substantial collection of official wartime publication. Following independence, the society was renamed the Indonesian Institute of Culture (Lembaga Kebudayaan Indonesia) before being dissolved in 1962. The library was then placed under the museum's jurisdiction.

=== National library ===
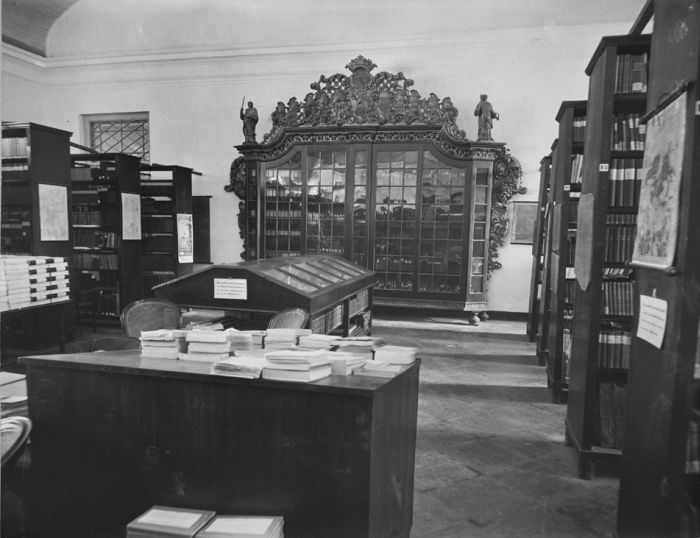
Library collection of the Royal Batavian Society of Arts and Sciences, c. 1896

Although a plan for a national library was included in the 1961 First National Development Plan, it was not sustained in the following years. In 1973, Mastini Hardjoprakoso, an employee of the National Museum library, developed a concept for the national library, but it was not immediately adopted by the Ministry of Education and Culture. However, the plan caught the attention of the National Development Planning Agency (Bappenas) and other information services. When a new culture director took office in 1978, the ministry finally gave its support for the project. Funding for the library was also provided by Madam Tien Suharto, who was impressed by a 1968 exhibition of colonial and national newspapers at the National Museum.

The National Library of Indonesia was created through a 1980 decree by the Minister of Education and Culture Daoed Joesoef. Four libraries were consolidated in the process: two departments of the Library Development Centre (the Library of Political and Social History, founded in 1952, and the Department of Bibliography and Deposits, founded in 1953); the library of the Jakarta regional office of the Ministry of Education and Culture, founded in 1953; and the library of the National Museum. In addition to the establishment of a national library system, the decree granted the library powers of legal deposit. The library was placed under the jurisdiction of the Directorate General for Culture within the ministry. The new library building opened in 1988.

Under Presidential Decree 11 of (6 March) 1989, the National Library fully subsumed the assets of the Library Development Centre and became a non-departmental government institution. It no longer reports to the ministry and is responsible to the President of Indonesia through the State Secretariat. The library's operations were once again revised through a 1997 decree in order to meet the needs of globalization.

== New building ==
The new library building, which took almost three years to build, is 126.3 meters tall, and has 27 floors. It was planned in line with "green building" concepts. Membership cards and books are equipped with Radio-frequency identification devices for security and to monitor the inventory.

=== Facilities ===
The new building of National Library consists of 24 operational floors. At the entrance of the main building, there is a plaza, four large rooms, two each on the right and left, displaying the history of Indonesian reading. The script room displays a map of Indonesia on a digital screen on one side of the wall with a recording telling the story of literacy in people of Indonesia. Next to the script room, there is a room that presents an explanation of the development of writing media as well as items that bear witness to history, such as bamboo writing media, alim wood, lontar leaves, gebang, daluang paper (dluwang), European paper to Chinese paper. In the hallway to the new building, there are glass cases with displays of scripts from around Indonesia, such as the Nagarakretagama by Empu Prapanca, and the Babad Diponegoro written by Prince Diponegoro. In the museum's pavilion there are also books about and photographs of Indonesia's first president, Sukarno. There is a green open space with colorful flowers leading to the new building. At the main lobby, there is a giant bookshelf adorned with an Indonesian map in the upper area. Some of the books available here include encyclopedias, novels, biographies and books on traditional fabrics. Rows of paintings of Indonesian presidents are hung in the lobby, which features a bookcase reaching to the fourth floor. Above it on the ceiling is an illustrated map of Indonesia.

The second floor there is an information center, member card making, and baggage locker. The third and fourth floors are often used as exhibition areas, while the fifth floor is to the library's office. The 10th to 13th floors are dedicated to deposits and closed monograph collections. On the 14th floor there is a collection of rare books. The 15th floor is the center of reference in Indonesia. All kinds of maps, including the first map in Indonesia, photos and classic paintings can be found on the 16th floor, while the 17th and 18th floors serve as an office for the Indonesian Sciences Academy (AIPI). The 19th floor is home to the library's multimedia room. 20th floor is to read current and old newspapers and journals. Floor 21–24 is dedicated for the collection of general books. The 21st and 22nd floors are allocated for books for military, religion, literature, novels, computer techniques, health and languages. Some of them are in English, but most are in Bahasa Indonesian. The 23rd floor offers books on international affairs, while the 24th floor for books about Indonesia. On the top floor, 24th floor there is also an executive lounge and a great place to see the panorama of Monas area. The seventh floor is dedicated to children, elderly and disabled people. A colorful Children Service room is located on the left side, while the service room for the elderly and disabled people is on the right. Children's service room is filled with books, toys, a playground, outdoor balcony and nursery room, while the latter boasts a collection of books on health as well as books in Braille. A canteen is located on the seventh floor and prayer room on sixth floor. The eighth floor contains audiovisual room with facilities of enjoying films from different genres or read old newspapers from the 1800s and more in microfilm form. This floor also has a private discussion room and a mini theater that can accommodate over 35 people. The ninth floor is home to a collection of ancient texts from across the archipelago. Not infrequently there is also a regular exhibition in the National Library of Indonesia.

== Services ==
The library serves the entire Indonesian people and is primarily a humanities library. National responsibility for science belongs to the Centre for Scientific Documentation and Information (Pusat Dokumentasi dan Informasi Ilmiah). The Centre for Agricultural Library and Technology Dissemination (Pusat Perpustakaan dan Penyebaran Teknologi Pertanian), formerly part of the Bogor Botanical Gardens, holds the responsibility for an agriculture library. Other libraries of national importance include the library of the Bandung Institute of Technology and the University of Indonesia medical faculty library.

Under the national library, Indonesia began its own International Standard Book Number and Cataloging in Publication programs. The library maintains bibliographies of the state ideology Pancasila and Javanese manuscripts. It also develops an independent computer housekeeping system and implements the MARC standards. Both the United States Library of Congress and the National Library of Australia maintain regional offices in Jakarta.

In January 2017, the National Library of Indonesia partnered with Neliti, a freely available repository of publications from Indonesian research institutions.

=== Library system ===
The 1980 ministerial decree also outlined a library system for the country. Aside from the national library, the decree established libraries at the provincial and other administrative levels. It outlined plans for an integrated system of school, academic/university, and mobile libraries.

== Gallery ==
The previous National Library building on Jalan Salemba

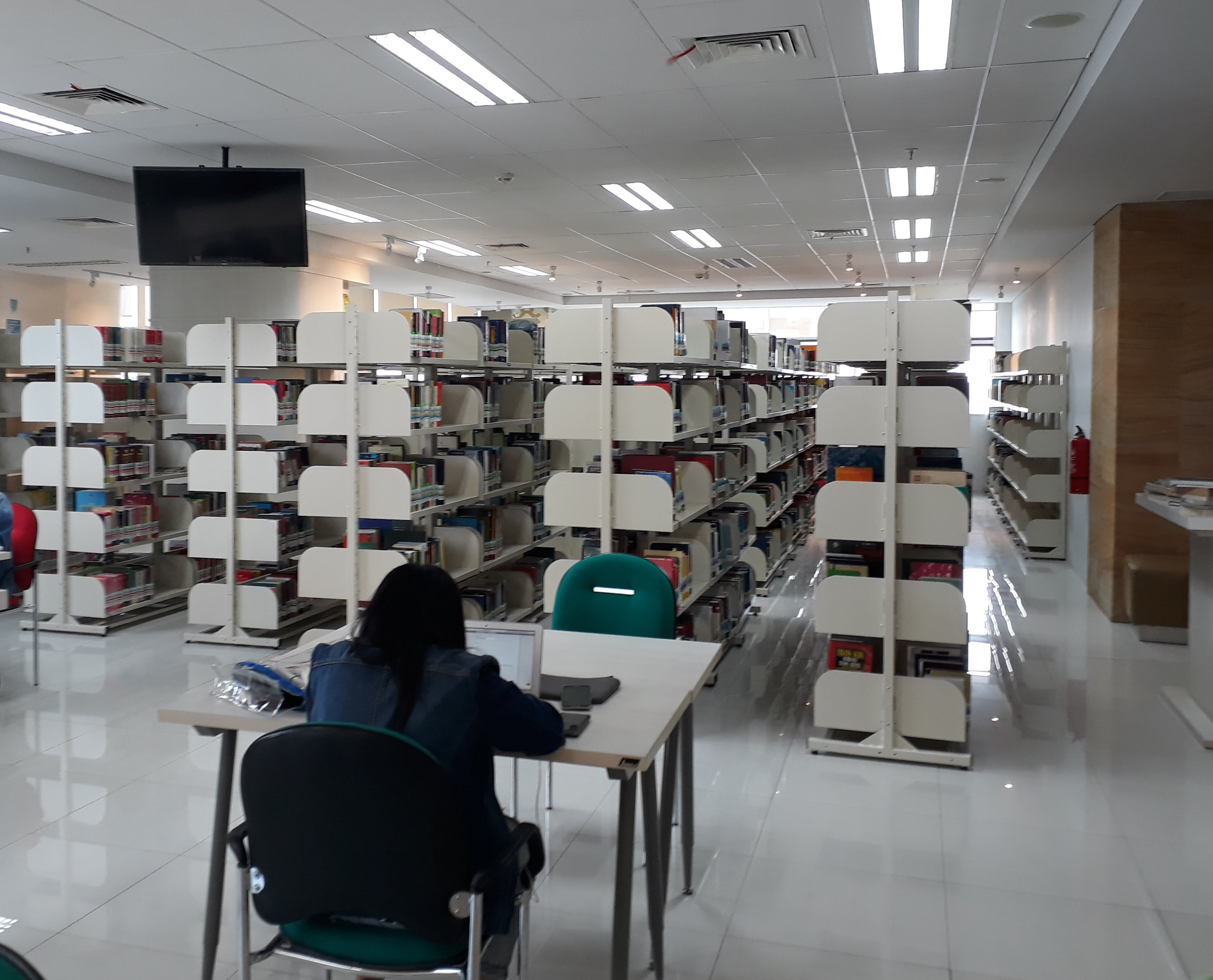
A reading room on the 21st floor of the Indonesian National Library

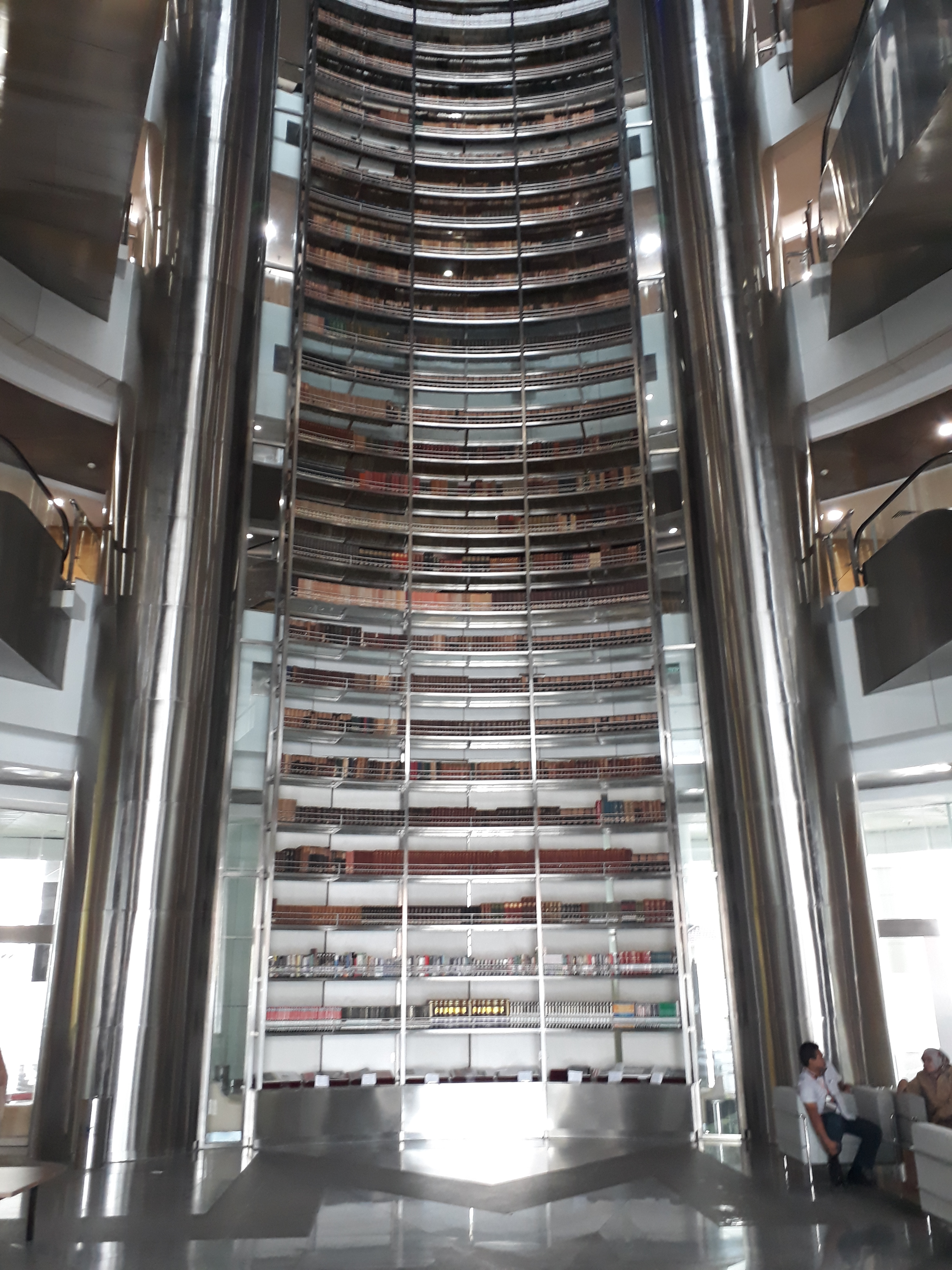
The 4-story bookcase in the lobby of the building

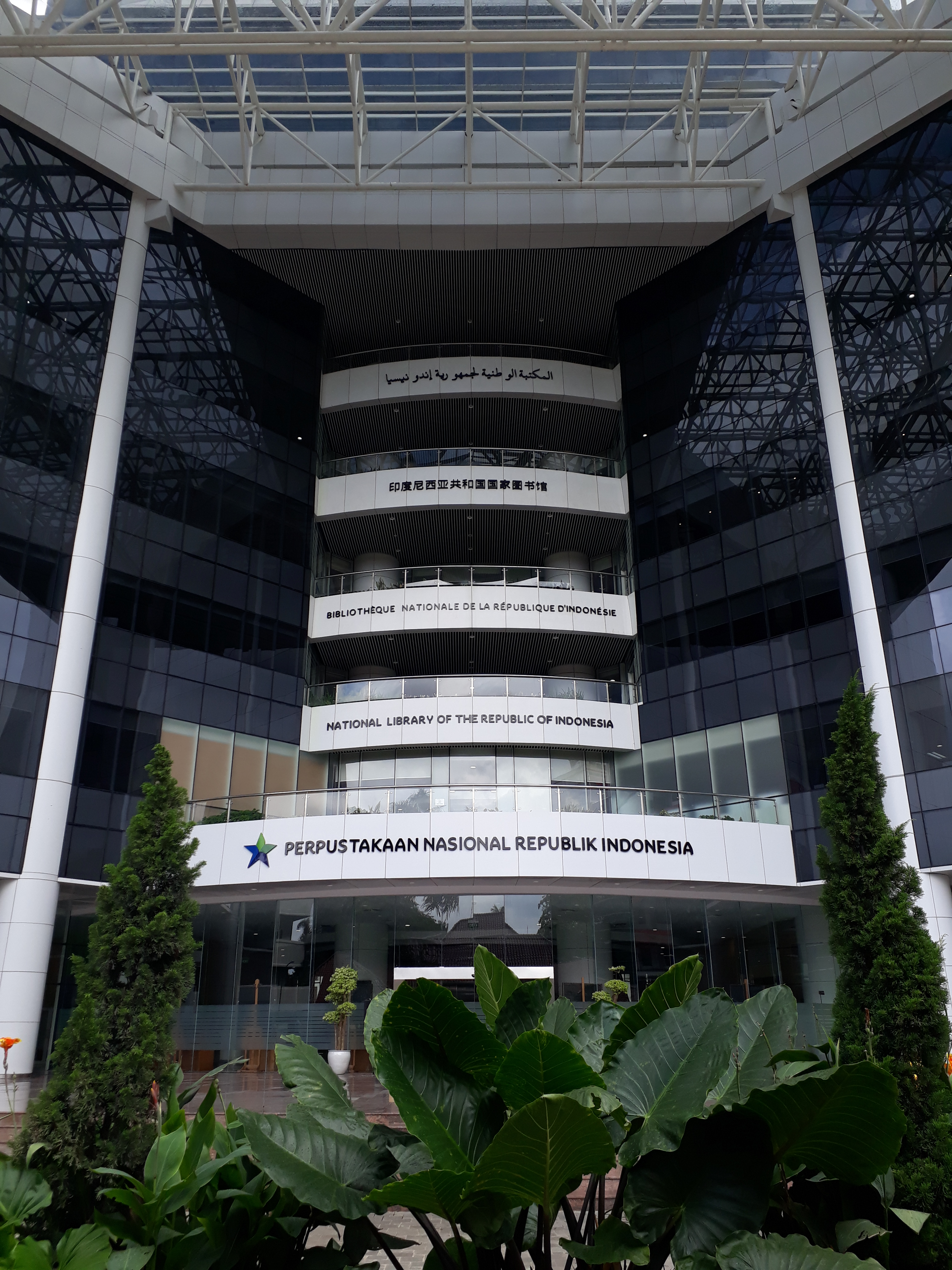
The garden and entrance to the library

== See also ==
- Indonesian literature
- National Archives of Indonesia
- Library Foundation Hatta, a charitable association library that assists national libraries in Indonesia
- List of libraries in Indonesia
