= Gerobak Batja =

Gerobak Batja is a mobile library that are placed in public spaces and can be accessed by anyone for free. This wagon is managed by a community of Alumni SMA 3 Semarang (ALSTE) years 1999 independently.

Forms cart selected in order to provoke the reader. The target is children ages kindergarten, elementary school and early teens. With the aim that children can get used to love reading from childhood.

Now it has operated one Gerobak Batja located in Taman Tirto Agung Tembalang Semarang, which was officially opened for use by the Education Office of Semarang. Gerobak Batja are open every Sunday morning starting at 07:00 pm till 10:00 pm. And its presence has been obtain positive appreciation from the mayor of Semarang Hendrar Prihadi through his personal Instagram account.

== See also ==
- List of libraries in Indonesia
