= Prince Diponegoro Monument =

- Patung Pangeran Diponegoro (Indonesian)
- Interactive map of Prince Diponegoro Monument
- 6.173219°S 106.827167°E
- Location: Merdeka Square, Jakarta, Indonesia

History
- Built: 1967

Site notes
- Architect: Vittorio di Colbertaldo

Prince Diponegoro Monument is a bronze equestrian statue of the Javanese Prince Diponegoro boldly riding a horse. The statue is located at Merdeka Square, Jakarta, in the northern part of the park. The statue symbolizes Diponegoro's leadership of his people against the Dutch colonial rulers during the Java War of 1825-1830. The statue was designed by an Italian sculptor Vittorio Di Colbertaldo. It was donated to Indonesia in 1965 by Dr. Mario Pitto, a wealthy Italian businessman who had served as the Italian consul-general to Indonesia in the early 1960s.

== Cited works ==
- Cumani, Claudio (2013). Il tempio nascosto - La cappella italiana sul Leitenberg a Dachau / Das versteckte Gotteshaus - Die italienische Kapelle auf dem Leitenberg bei Dachau [The hidden church - The Italian Chapel on Leitenberg at Dachau] (PDF) (in Italian and German). München: COM.IT.ES. Monaco di Baviera. Archived from the original (PDF) on 2016-08-04.
- Merrillees, Scott (2015). Jakarta: Portraits of a Capital 1950-1980. Jakarta: Equinox Publishing. ISBN 9786028397308.
