= Merdeka Square, Jakarta =

Square in Indonesia

Merdeka Square
- Public square
- Medan Merdeka (Indonesian); Lapangan Merdeka (Indonesian)
- Former names: Lapangan Ikada; Koningsplein
- A view of Merdeka Square in 2015, with National Monument standing in the middle of the square.
- Features: National Monument, fountain, statues
- Constructed: 1961–1976
- Opened: 1976
- Amenities: parking
- Area: 1 square kilometre (100 ha)
- Surface: stone pavement and grass
- Dedicated to: Indonesia independence
- Location: Jakarta, Indonesia
- Location of Merdeka Square in Jakarta
- Coordinates: 6°10′31″S 106°49′38″E

Merdeka Square (Indonesian: Medan Merdeka or Lapangan Merdeka lit. "independence Square"; formerly Dutch: Koningsplein, lit. "King's Square") is a large square located in the center of Jakarta, Indonesia. Measuring approximately one square kilometer per area, if the surrounding fields within the Merdeka Square are included, it is considered one of the largest squares in the world. At 100 hectares, it is over two times the size of Tiananmen Square, and 8 times the size of Place de la Concorde.

At its center stands the National Monument, often called Monas (Monumen Nasional). The paved plaza surrounds the monument often host national events such as military and float parades, as well as civic demonstrations. Surrounding the Monument is now a park with a musical fountain in western side, and a deer enclosure where deer roam among the shady trees in the southeast corner. The square is a popular destination for Jakartans for sports and recreation especially on weekends.

It is surrounded by important government buildings such as the Merdeka Palace, the National Museum, the National Library, Jakarta City Hall, Istiqlal Mosque, the Supreme Court and various governmental ministries. During the colonial Dutch East Indies era the square was called Koningsplein (King's square).

== History ==
=== Koningsplein ===
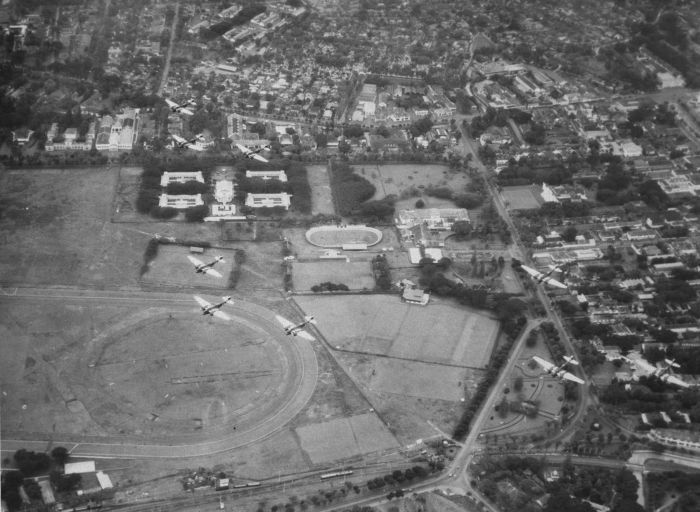
Royal Dutch East Indies Army bomber planes fly over Batavia Koningsplein in the 1930s.

In the late 18th century when the Dutch East Indies government moved their center of administration about 4 kilometres southward, from coastal old Batavia (now Kota) to Weltevreden (now Central Jakarta), they built several important buildings including the square. Formerly, it was a large open field for herding kerbau (water buffalo), and therefore called Buffelsveld. There were two main squares in Weltevreden: Buffelsveld and Paradeplaats (Parade ground, later renamed Waterlooplein, now Lapangan Banteng). The squares began to take shape during Daendels' rule in the early 19th century; Waterlooplein became the main parade and ceremonial square, while the Buffelsveld ("buffalo field") was renamed Champ de Mars after the field in Paris due to French influence and used as a military exercise field.

In 1818, a few years after the formation of the United Kingdom of the Netherlands, the square's name was changed into Koningsplein ("King's square"). Around the same time the governor-general's residence was moved to a new palace, now known as Istana Merdeka. The colonial government built athletic tracks, a stadium and sports facilities on Koningsplein. The locals called the square Lapangan Gambir, after Uncaria gambir, a plant which grows around the field. The Lapangan Gambir became the location of Pasar Gambir, a Pasar Malam (night market) fair and festival to commemorate Queen Wilhelmina's birthday in 1906. Since 1921 Pasar Gambir was held annually, turning into the annual modern Jakarta Fair. The square's name remained the same throughout colonial Dutch East Indies era until the Japanese invasion in 1942.

=== Lapangan Ikada ===
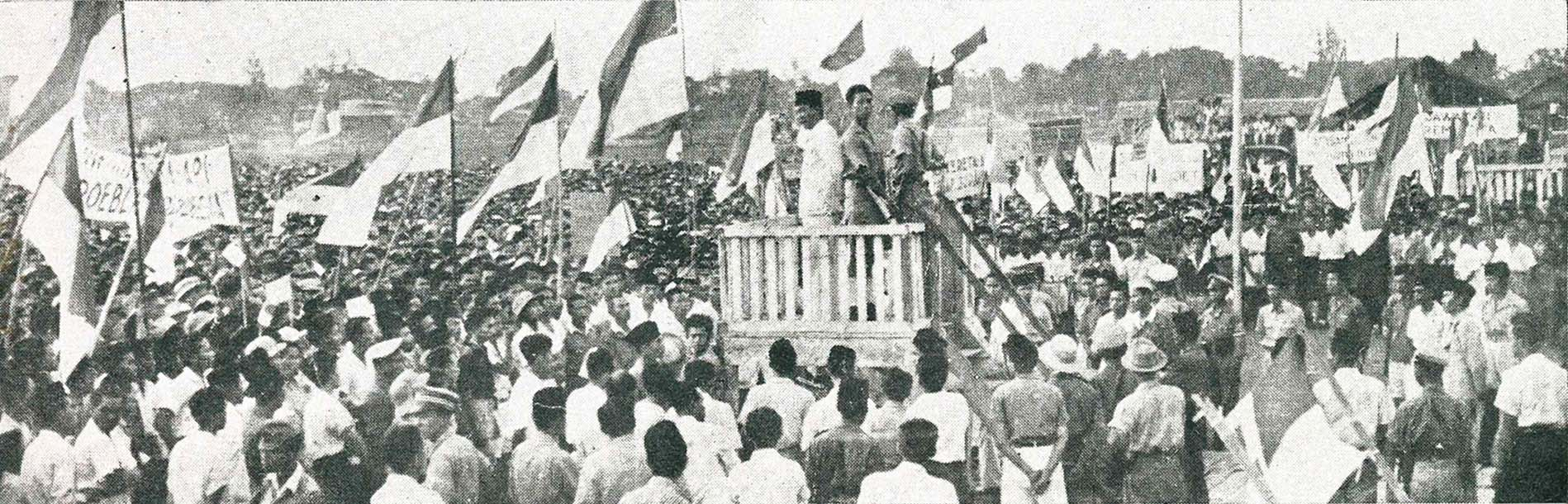
Sukarno speaking at the Rapat Akbar on 19 September 1945.

In 1942, during the Japanese occupation of the Dutch East Indies, the square was named Lapangan Ikada (acronym of Ikatan Atletik Djakarta or Jakarta Athletic Bond). The proclamation of Indonesian independence was originally intended to be staged at Lapangan Ikada. It was however moved to a house in Jalan Pegangsaan (now Jalan Proklamasi). On 19 September 1945, Sukarno held his Indonesian independence and anti-colonialism/imperialism speech, during Rapat Akbar or grand meeting. During the Indonesian National Revolution (1945–1949), the returning Dutch colonial forces managed to gain control over Jakarta (Batavia) and its vicinity, and renamed most of places to their colonial names; including Ikada field changed back to Koningsplein.

=== Medan Merdeka ===
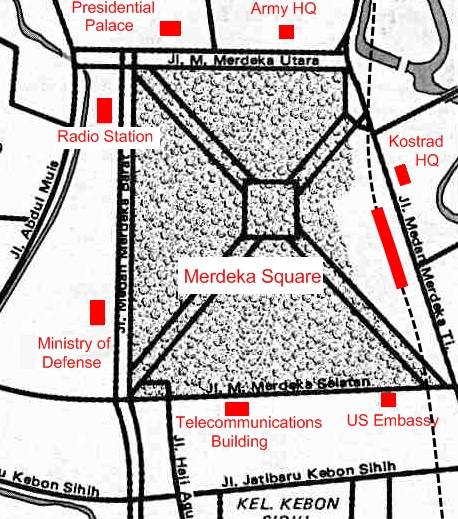
Plan of Merdeka Square in 1965

In 1949 Sukarno changed the name of Koningsplein to Medan Merdeka ("Independence Square"). By this time, the square was already crowded by the existence of Gambir railway station, Police Department Head Office, Telephone Company Office, Ikada Stadium, a sport-hall, many parks, many football fields and tennis lawns.

In 1954, President Sukarno launched the idea of erecting a "National Monument" at the center of Merdeka Square. Sukarno desired that the Indonesian people and the young independent nation had something to be proud of, a monument to commemorate the struggle for independence. His ambition was to make the Monas the tallest building in Jakarta, higher than Borobudur and larger than the Eiffel Tower. A design competition was held in 1956, followed by a second competition in 1960, however the President was not satisfied by the design entries, and no winner was announced. Instead Sukarno — who had previously studied architecture — asked architects to refine sketches made by himself. The design of the monument was eventually resulted from the work of architect Soedarsono. Sukarno's layout for Merdeka Square was based on a plan initially developed in 1892 with diagonal streets radiating from the monument.

The construction of National Monument (Indonesian: Monumen Nasional or Monas) was initiated in 1961, but it was only completed in 1976. Except the railway station, other buildings in the square — such as the Ikada Stadium and sports facilities — were demolished to make way for the construction of the monument, and replaced by four segments of garden. Today, the square is more popular with its nickname Lapangan Monas.

The Merdeka Square is crossed by four diagonal streets which form an "X" with the National Monument at its center. The street is called Jalan Silang Monas and separates the square into four parts: North, East, South, and West parks. Soon after construction works of the National Monument were completed, new buildings were grown at the southern part of the square. The north, east and west park remained a park, while the southern segment was developed into a building complex. In the 1970s to early 1990s, this southern section was occupied by the fairground for Jakarta Fair from 1968 to 1992, while the southwest corner of the south park was used as Taman Ria Jakarta or Jakarta amusement park, including many exhibition halls, restaurants and night-clubs.

The design of the parks stayed relatively unchanged from the 1970s to mid 1990s, and this situation led to the preparation of a master plan for redeveloping the square, established in 1993. The 1993 master plan guided the ongoing renovation conducted in the late 1990s to the 2000s, and gave the Merdeka square its present look. The aim was to return the function of Merdeka Square as an open space and green area. All buildings were removed and the square was transformed back to greenery. Since the early 1990s the fairground and the amusement park in the southern park were demolished had been given the old park function once again. The road surrounding the monument is not accessible to motorized traffic.

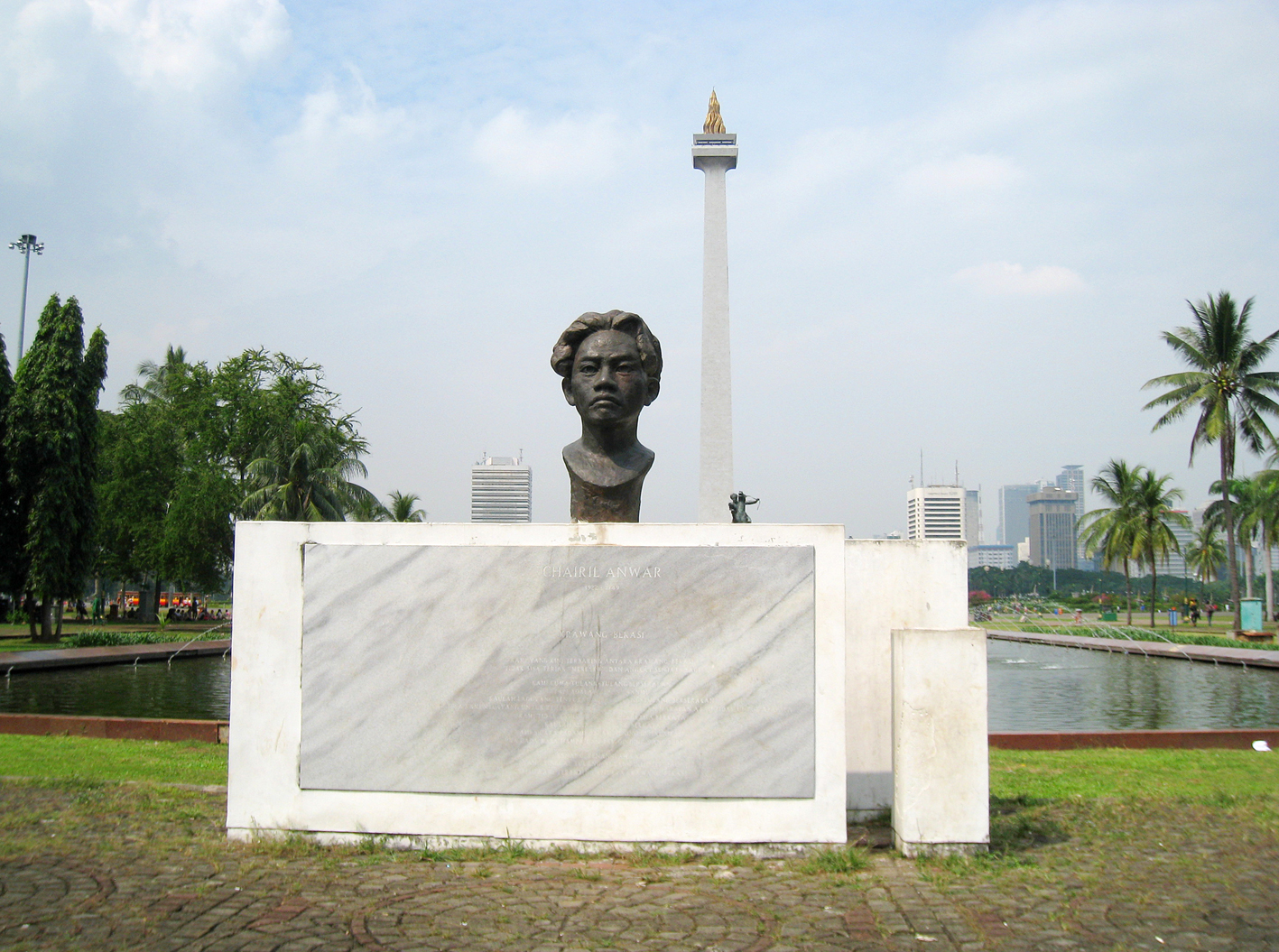
The bust memorial of Chairil Anwar, Indonesian poet, northern park of Merdeka Square.

In 2002, after Megawati was elected president, the governor of Jakarta Sutiyoso built a high fence with gates and guards to enclose the entire square. While visitors can access the square without charge, beggars, vendors, homeless and other social groups were excluded. An army encampment has been set up within the compound to enforce the new rules. Other than the National Monument in the center, the square itself is Jakartans' popular destination for family recreation and outdoor sports activities during weekend, such as family picnics, flying kites, calisthenics, football games, jogging and bicycling. The paved plaza surrounds the monument often host national events as well as civic demonstrations. Military and float parades usually took place during the Jakarta anniversary around 22 June and Indonesian independence commemoration around 17 August. Flag raising ceremonies are held at the north end during city-wide public anniversaries.

Since 2016, all Independence Day national celebrations begin with the departure and arrival of replicas of both the national flag and the text of the Proclamation of Independence, in the monument and the square, en route to Merdeka Palace in the morning, and returning to the square in the evening.

== Design ==
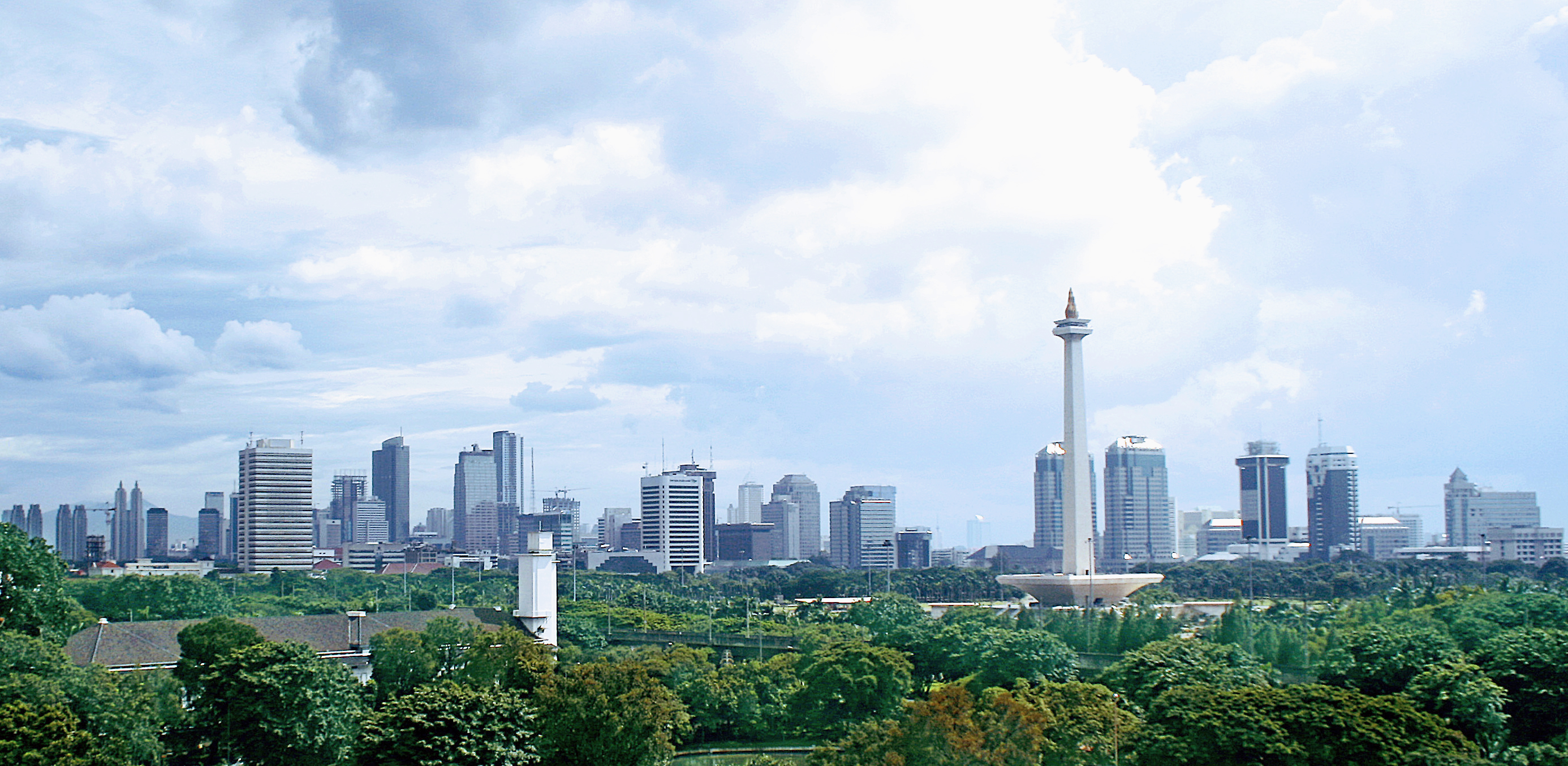
The view of Merdeka Square and Jakarta skyline from Istiqlal Mosque, Jakarta.

The shape of Merdeka Square has been altered several times within its two-century history. The current design is mainly based on the site plan from the 1960s — as a part of the design of the National Monument that incorporated diagonal crossed streets that separated four cardinal parks. Recent development on the square is based on a master plan produced in 1993.

Renovation began in the mid-1990s for the commemoration of the 50th anniversary of Indonesian Independence in 1995, and continued well to the 2000s. The renovation moved the roundabout street further from the monument as it was feared that the vibrations from the passing vehicles would shake and disturb the monument's foundation. However, it was later decided that vehicles should be prohibited to enter the square altogether. The further roundabout created a larger central garden around the monument. The asphalt road was changed to French stone pavement and created a grand plaza around the monument.

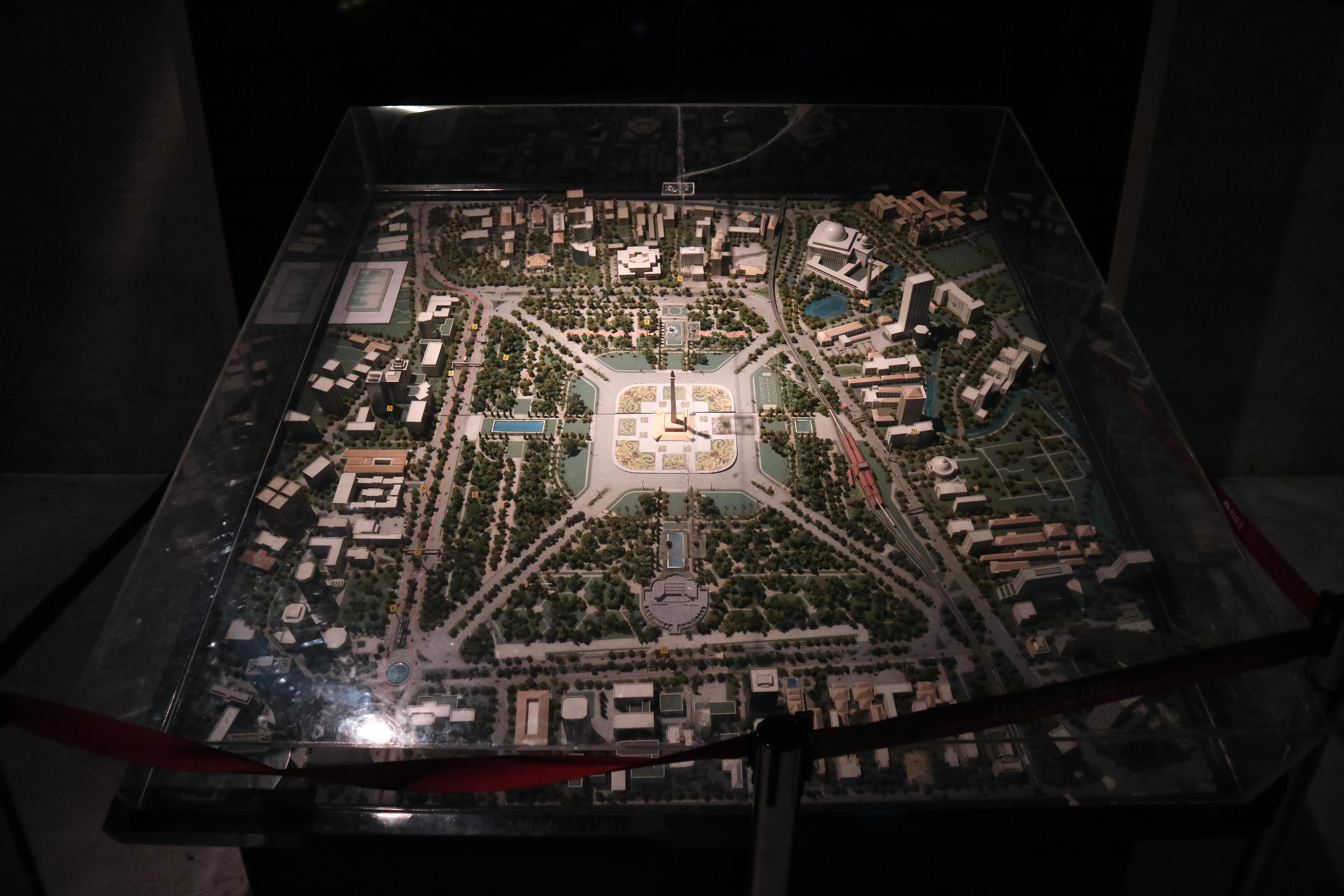
Architectural model of Merdeka Square, displayed in National Monument

The Merdeka square consists of two zones:

1. Taman Medan Merdeka (Medan Merdeka Park). The large trees, reflecting ponds and fountains are located in this zone. The zone span from the fences on the outer rim of the park to the pedestrian path around the park.
2. Ruang Agung (The Grand Space). It is the grand space to enhance the view of National Monument. There are no large trees or any visual obstructions allowed in this zone. It is located from the pedestrian path to the National Monument in the center. It consists of grass fields, stone paved grand plaza, and a central garden around the monument filled with colorful flowers and decorative plants.

There are four parks in Merdeka Square according to the cardinal points:

1. Taman Medan Merdeka Utara (North Merdeka Park). The entrance to the tunnel that leads to the National Monument is located on this north park. A reflecting pond, the equestrian statue of Diponegoro and a bust statue of Indonesian poet Chairil Anwar also located in this area.
2. Taman Medan Merdeka Timur (East Merdeka Park). Immediately located near the Gambir Station. The reflecting pond and the statue of Kartini, Indonesian heroine of women emancipation, donated by Japanese government that originally stood in front of Taman Suropati in Menteng is relocated here.
3. Taman Medan Merdeka Selatan (South Merdeka Park). The Grand Meeting of 19 September 1945 monument or a flag-bearing statue is located here. The spotted deer park is located on southeast corner. The south park used to display unique plants as the symbol of the 33 Indonesian provinces. However, in November 2019 these trees along with total 200 large trees were cut down on the orders of then Jakarta Governor Anies Baswedan, and in its place a large paved plaza were built. The IRTI parking ground, souvenir and foodstalls for National Monument visitors is located in this southern park.
4. Taman Medan Merdeka Barat (West Merdeka Park). The dancing illuminated fountain is located here. The fountain show with music is performed every weekend nights. The bust of Mohammad Husni Thamrin, a national hero from Jakarta, is located here. The Monas MRT subway station is currently under construction in the West Merdeka Park.

== Notable sites ==
Map of Merdeka Square, Jakarta, and surrounding important buildings.

Merdeka square is the heart of Jakarta as well as the centre of Indonesia. Many important government and cultural buildings are located around this central park of Jakarta.

=== North ===
- State Secretariat and Bina Graha
- Merdeka Palace
- Supreme Court
- Ministry of Home Affairs
- Indonesian Army headquarters
- Istiqlal Mosque (northeast corner)

=== East ===
- Gambir Station
- Pertamina headquarters
- Army Strategic Reserve Command (KOSTRAD) headquarters
- Indonesian National Armed Forces (TNI) Jakarta garrison office
- Ministry of Transportation office
- Indonesian Scouts headquarters
- Inspectorate General of Ministry of Home Affairs Building
- Immanuel Church
- National Gallery of Indonesia
- PT Timah office
- Ministry of Maritime Affairs and Fisheries
- Army Military Police Corps
- Vatican Apostolic Nunciature to Indonesia
- Perusahaan Listrik Negara (PLN) Jakarta branch office (southeast corner)

=== South ===
- Embassy of the United States
- Vice President's Palace
- Jakarta City Hall and Governor's office
- National Resilience Institute
- Telkom Indonesia Jakarta branch office
- New building of National Library of Indonesia (branch of the National Library in Salemba, also functioned as a library)
- Ministry of State-Owned Enterprises
- Danareksa Tower
- BSI Tower
- Ministry of Energy and Mineral Resources

=== West ===
- Bank Indonesia headquarters (southwest corner)
- Indosat headquarters
- Ministry of Tourism
- Coordinating Ministry for Political and Security Affairs
- Ministry of Defense
- National Museum of Indonesia
- Ministry of Communication and Digital Affairs
- Ministry of Transportation
- Constitutional Court
- Radio Republik Indonesia (RRI) main office building and Jakarta studios
- Coordinating Ministry for Human Development and Cultural Affairs
- TNI military post
- PT Berdikari headquarters

== Transportation ==
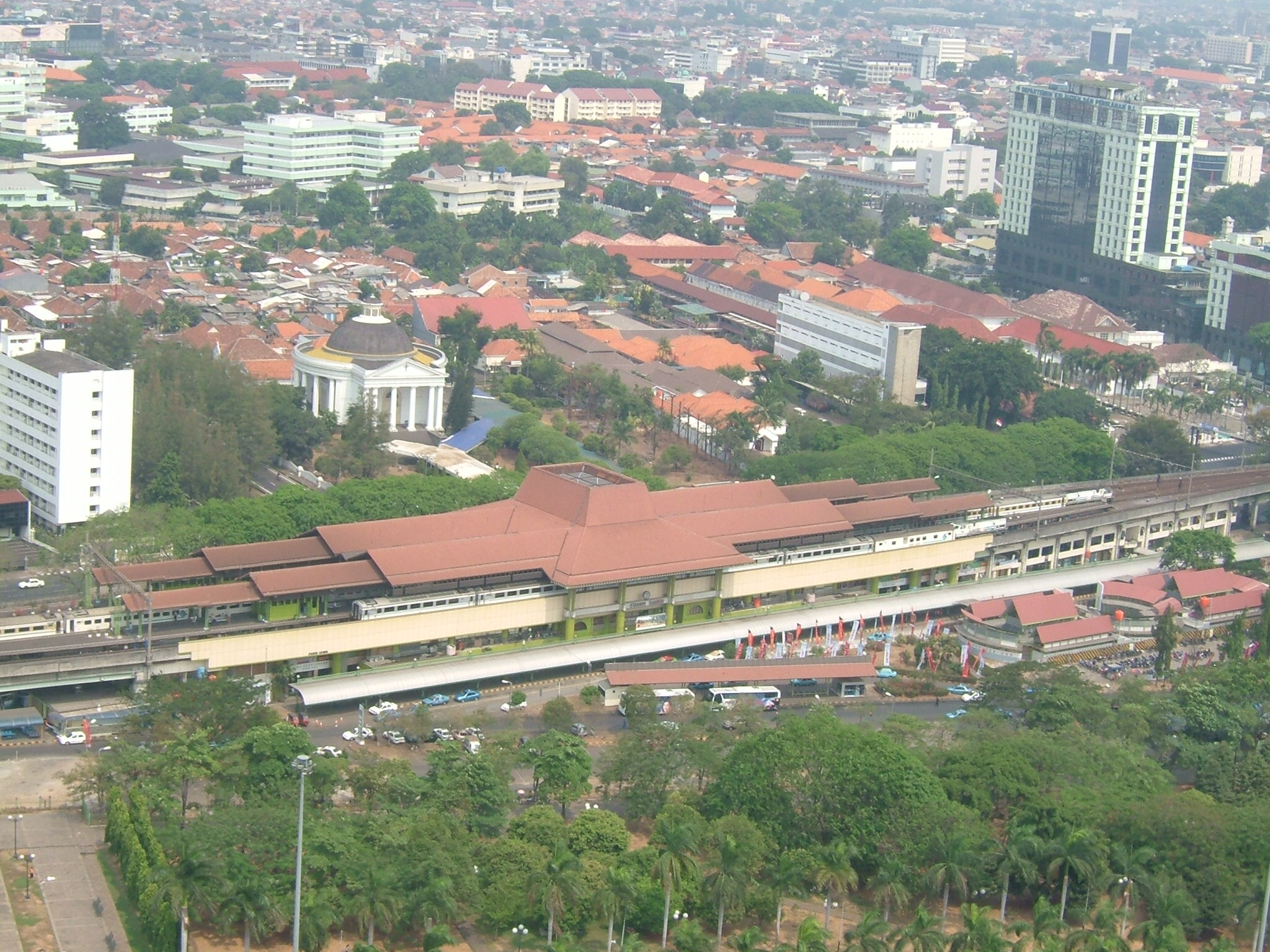
Gambir Station on east side of the square.

The square is easily accessible using public transportations. The Transjakarta bus rapid transit service has four shelters located by the square; they are Monas shelter (corridor 1) in front of National Museum, Gambir, Balai Kota and Gambir 2 (corridor 2). The Gambir railway station located in the east side also provide access, although the station currently only serves intercity trains, with Argo-class executive trains connecting Jakarta to Surabaya, Cirebon, Bandung and Solo. The Juanda and Gondangdia stations are within a walking distance to the square, providing KRL Commuterline access via its Bogor (Red) Line.

The free Jakarta city tour double decker bus, operated by Transjakarta, also pass through Jalan Medan Merdeka Barat and Jalan Merdeka Selatan lining western and southern edge of the square. With three city tour bus stops in Medan Merdeka Barat Avenue; in front of National Museum, on western and southwestern corner of the square, while a city tour bus stop located in front of Balai Kota Jakarta. A line of DAMRI airport bus service connects Soekarno-Hatta International Airport with Gambir Station. The square is also accessible using taxi, and three wheeled bajaj.

In the future, the Jakarta MRT is planned to operate Monas MRT station on the western side of the square. It is currently under construction.

== Gallery ==
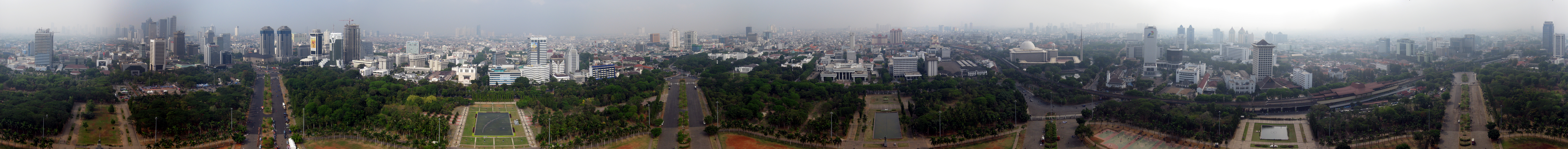
The view of Merdeka Square and Central Jakarta from Monas, as of 2011
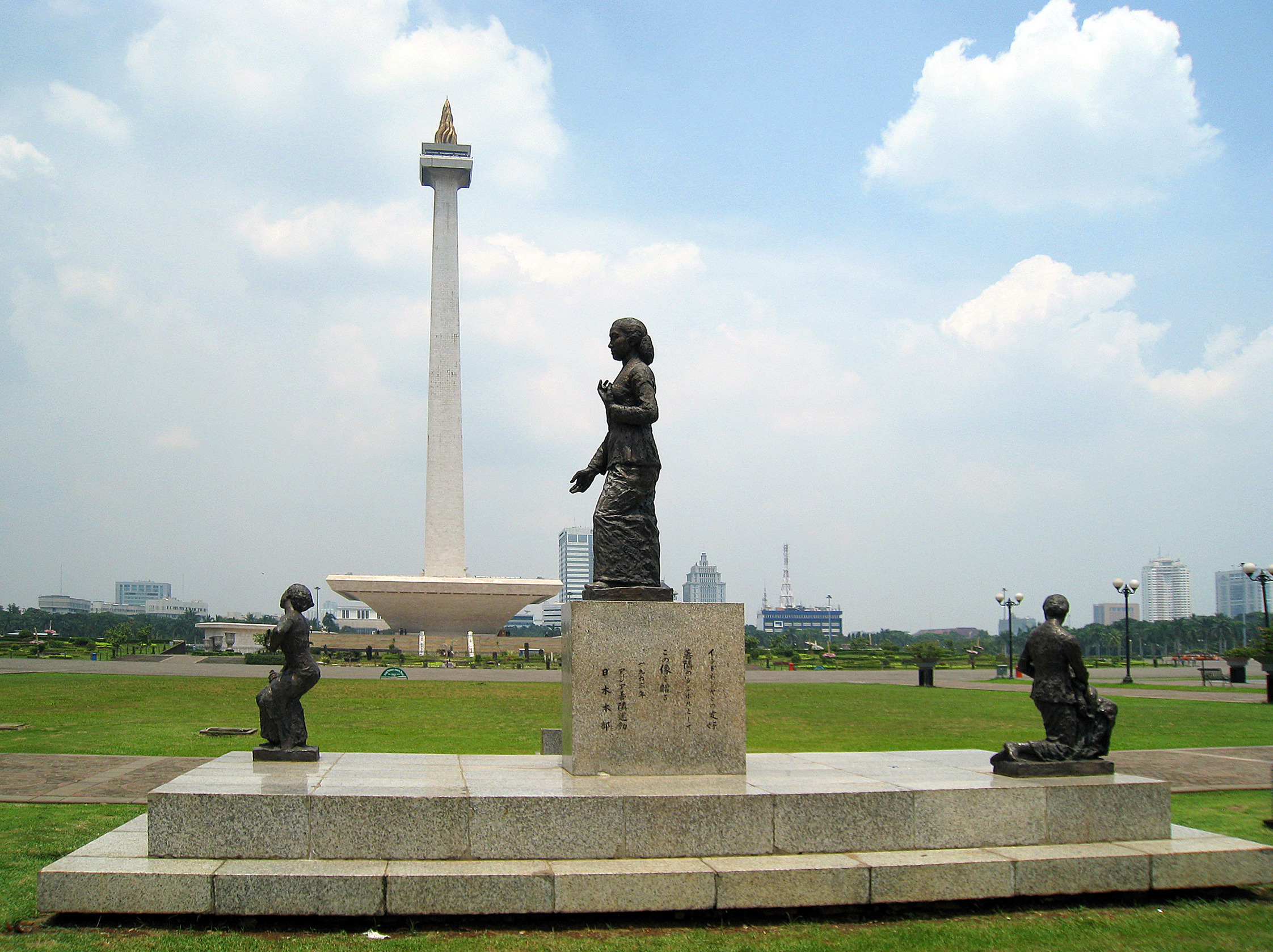
Kartini statue

The Monas reflecting pool

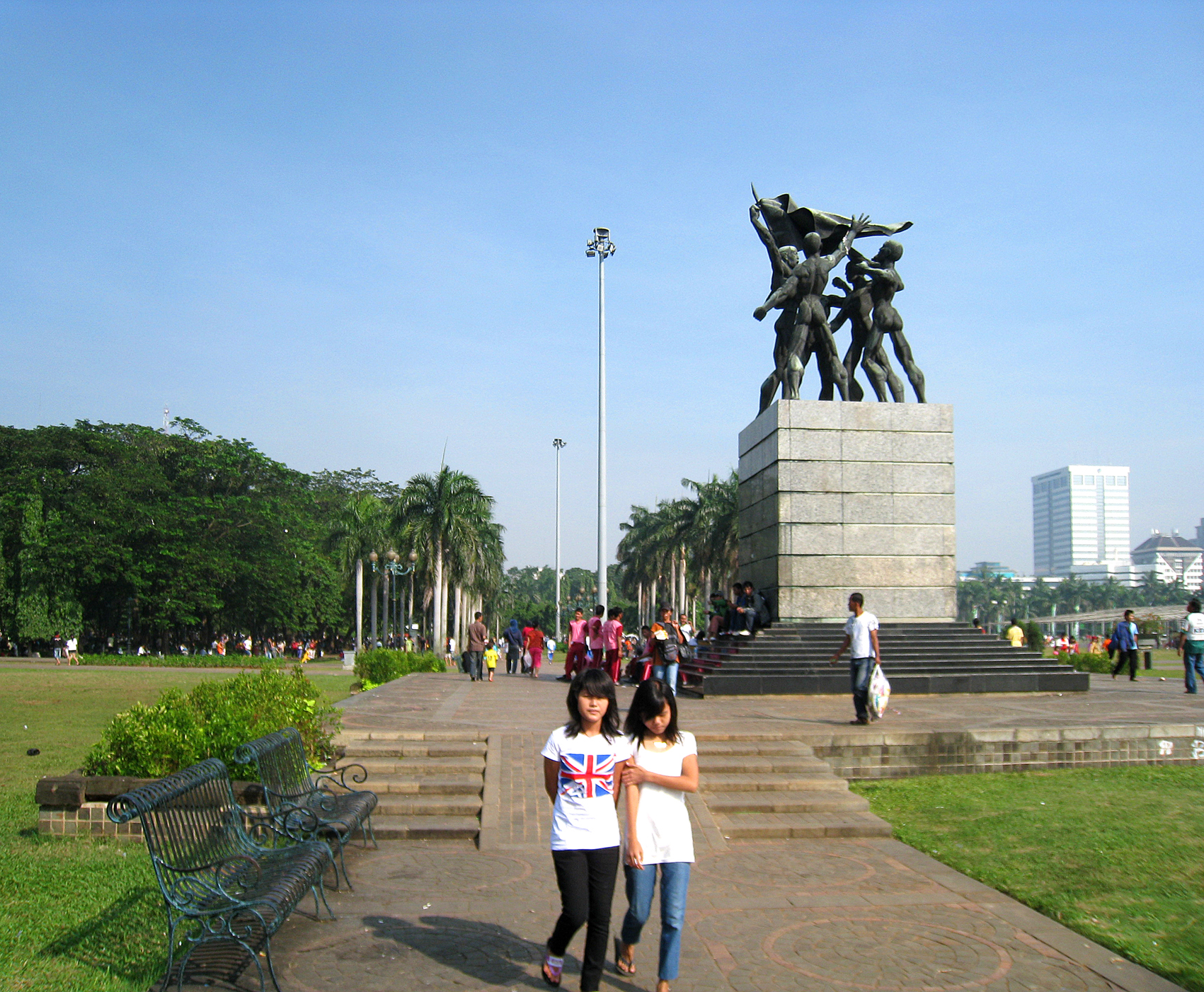
Visitors enjoying the park

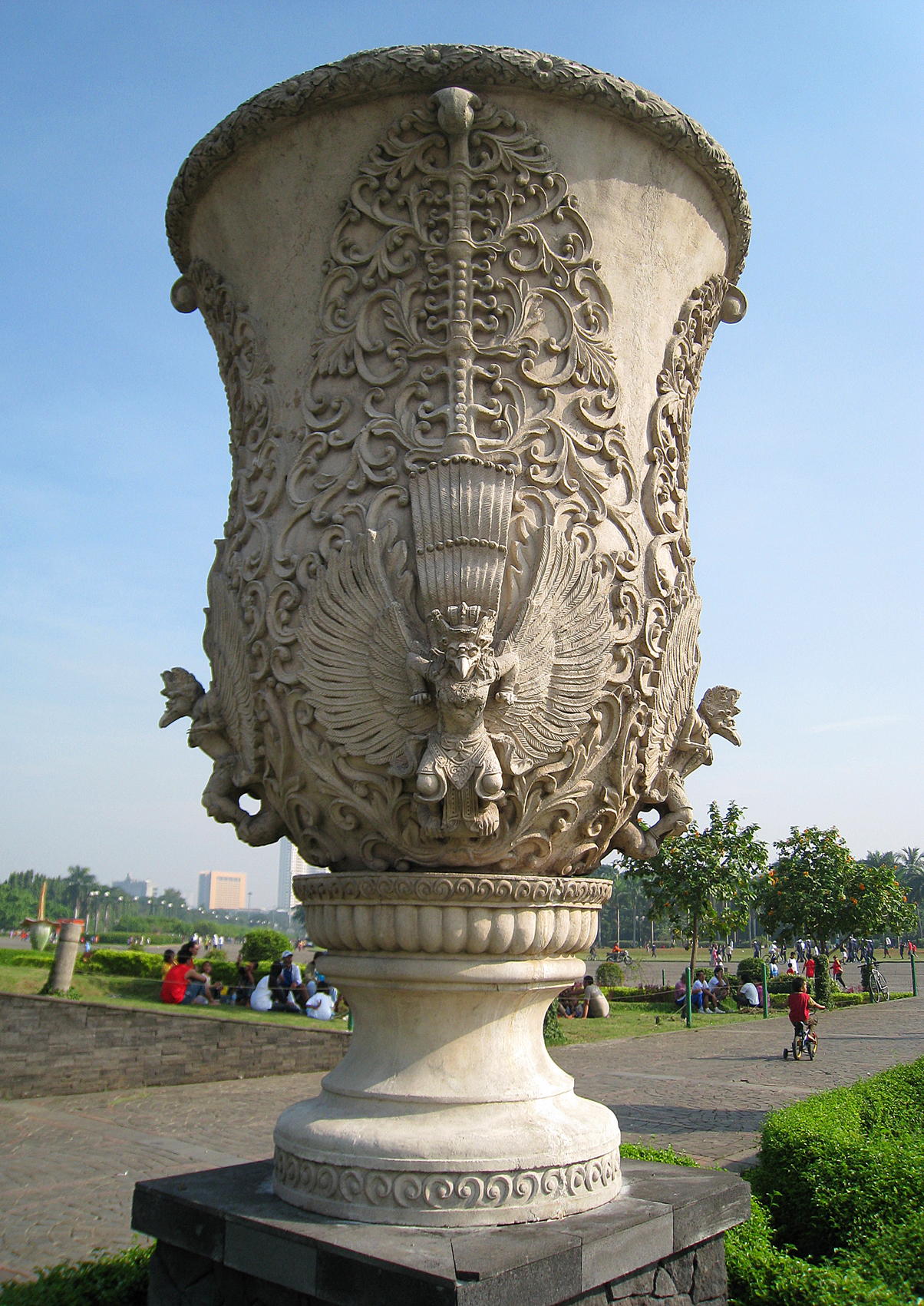
Garuda garden vase

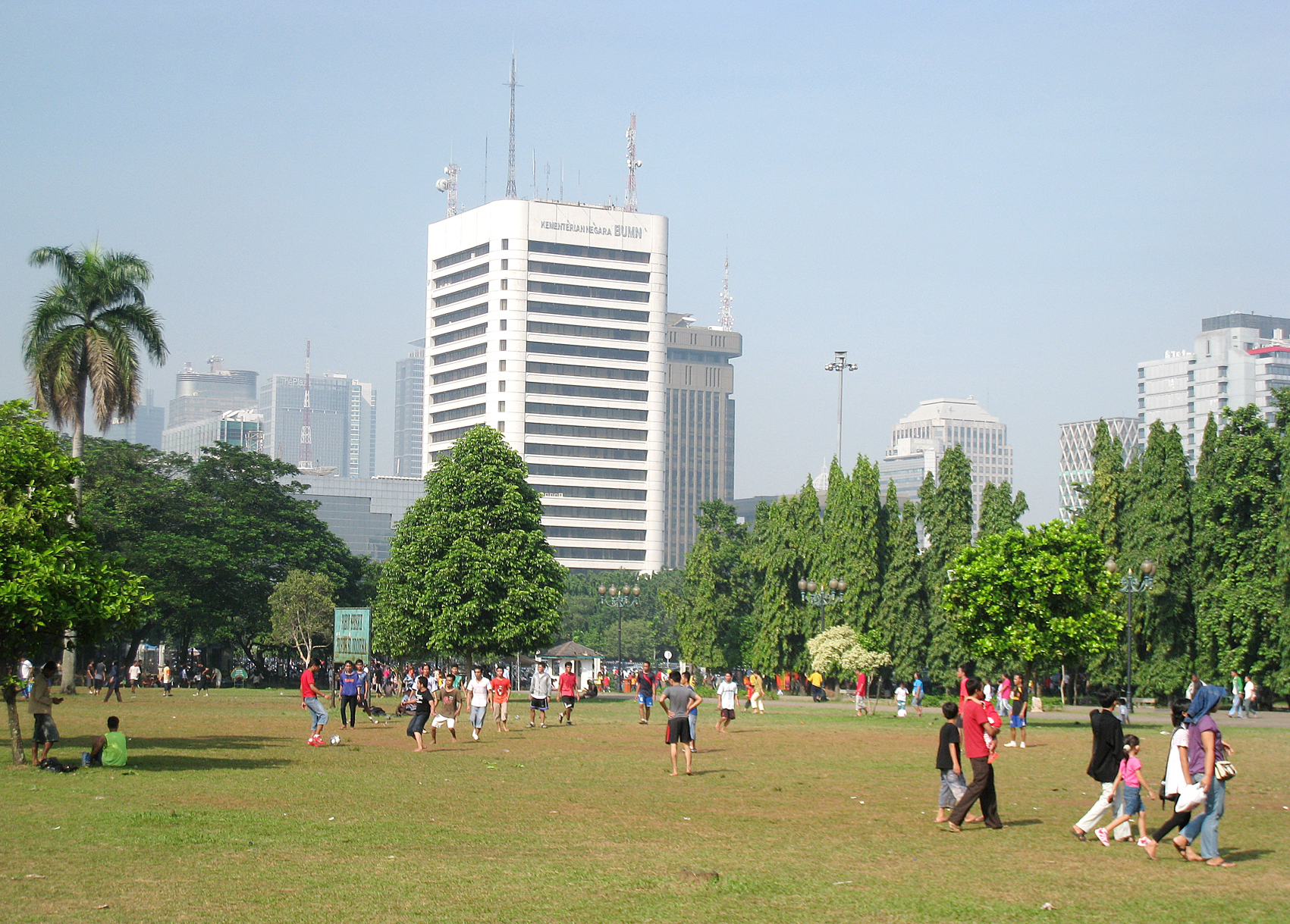
Football play at Merdeka Square

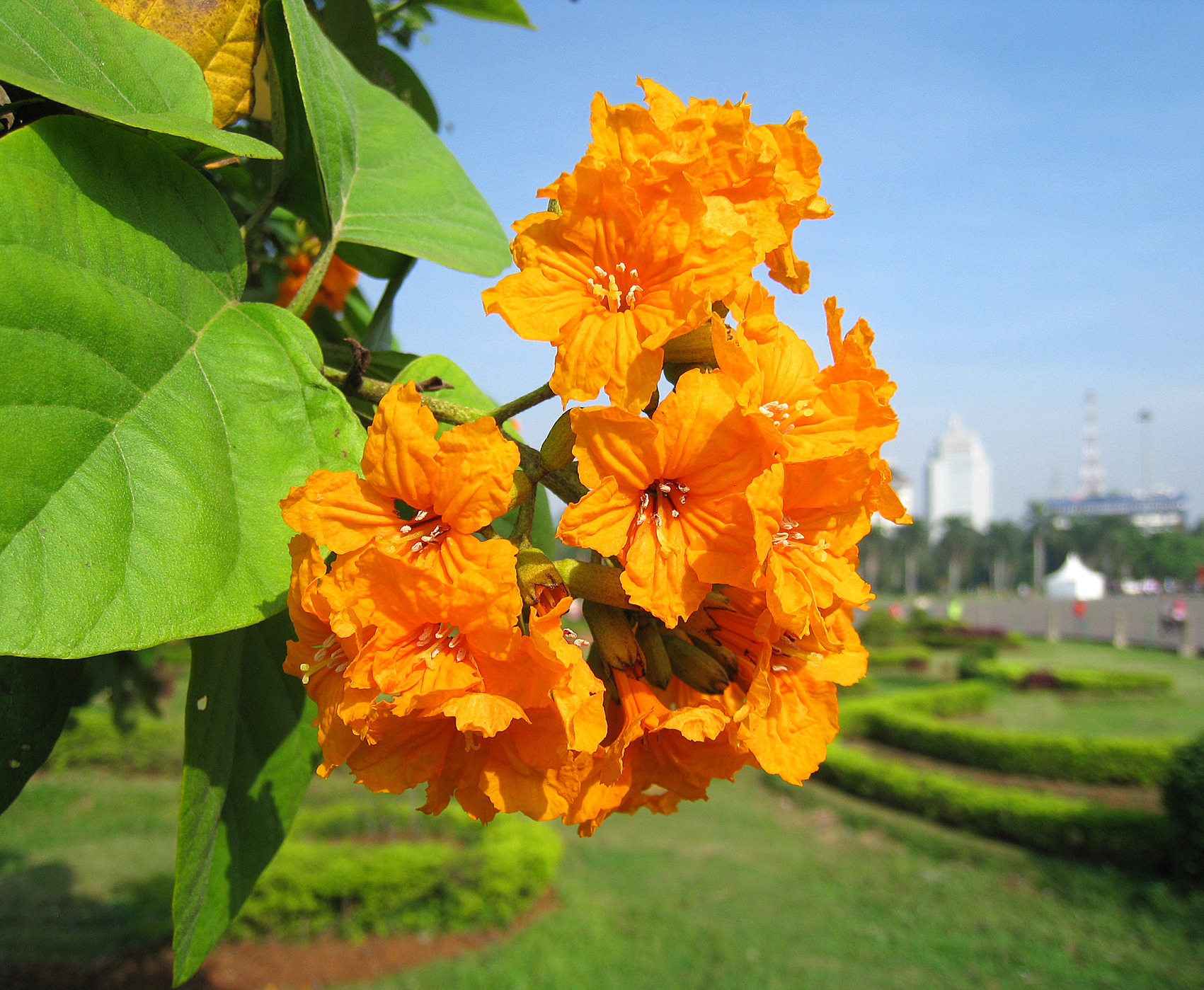
Flower garden

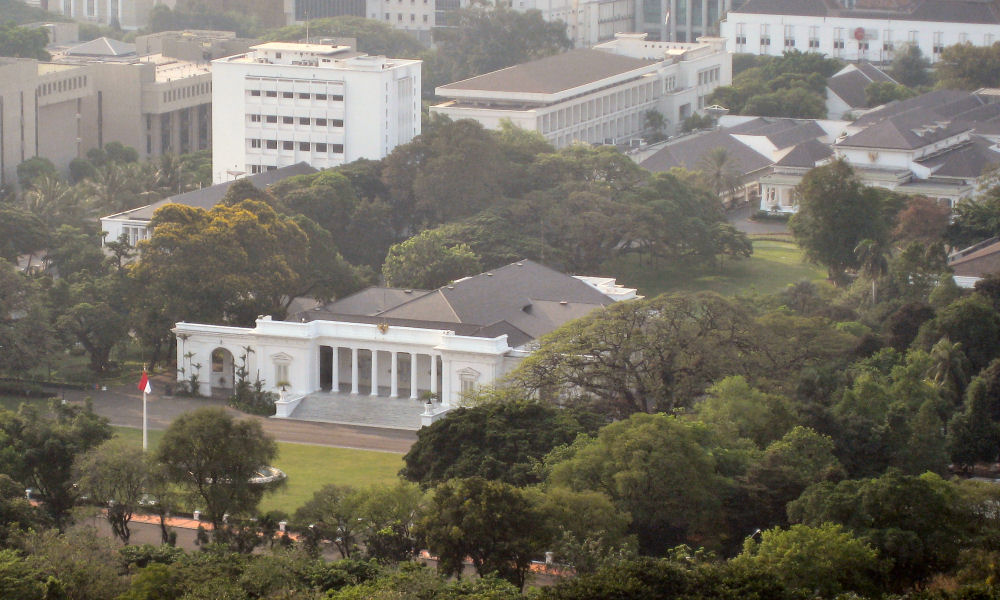
Merdeka Palace

Istiqlal Mosque and Jakarta Cathedral

== See also ==
- Dataran Merdeka, Kuala Lumpur
- Monas
