= List of libraries in Indonesia =

This is a list of libraries in Indonesia.

== Libraries by region ==
=== Java ===
Jakarta

- East Jakarta Library (in Indonesian)
- Jakarta Public Library, est.1977
- Jakarta State Islamic University library
- National Library of Indonesia, Gambir, Jakarta, est.1980
- Royal Netherlands Institute of Southeast Asian and Caribbean Studies (KITLV) library, Jakarta

Yogyakarta

- Gadjah Mada University Library, Sleman, Yogyakarta
- Hatta Foundation Library, Yogyakarta
- Sonobudoyo Museum and library, Yogyakarta
- Sunan Kalijaga Islamic University library, Yogyakarta

Elsewhere

- Bogor Agricultural University Library, Bogor, est.1964
- Bibliotheca Bogoriensis, Bogor, West Java
- Gerobak Batja mobile library, Semarang, Central Java
- Maulana Malik Ibrahim State Islamic University Malang library, East Java
- Perpustakaan Alam Malabar, Mekarsari Village, West Java
- Rekso Pustoko Library, Surakarta, Central Java
- State Institute on Islamic Studies Purwokerto library, Banyumas, Central Java
- University of Indonesia Central Library, Depok, West Java

=== Kalimantan ===
- Mulawarman University library, Samarinda
- Paliat State Elementary School Library, Kelua

=== Maluku Islands ===
- Desa Kase library, Leksula
- Library of Public Senior High School 3 Buru Selatan, Maluku

=== Nusa Tenggara ===
- Balinese Cultural Documentation Library, Bali
- Gedong Kirtya, est.1928, Singaraja, Bali

=== Papua ===
- Cendrawasih University library, Jayapura

=== Sulawesi ===
- Manado city public library
- Palu Regional Library

=== Sumatra ===
- Al-Falah Library, Rupit
- Bung Hatta Library, Bukittinggi, West Sumatra
- Indonesian Oil Palm Research Institute Library, Medan
- Lampung Muhammadiyah University library, Kedaton, Bandar Lampung (Indonesian: UPT Perpustakaan UNILA)
- Muara Sabak Regional Public Library, East Tanjung Jabung, Jambi
- Soeman Hs Library, Pekanbaru, Riau
- Tanjung Pinang State Library, Riau, est.1959

== See also ==
- Copyright law of Indonesia
- Indonesian literature
- Library associations in Indonesia
- Mass media in Indonesia
- National Archives of Indonesia
