= University of Indonesia Central Library =

Library in Depok, West Java, Indonesia

- Perpustakaan Pusat Universitas Indonesia
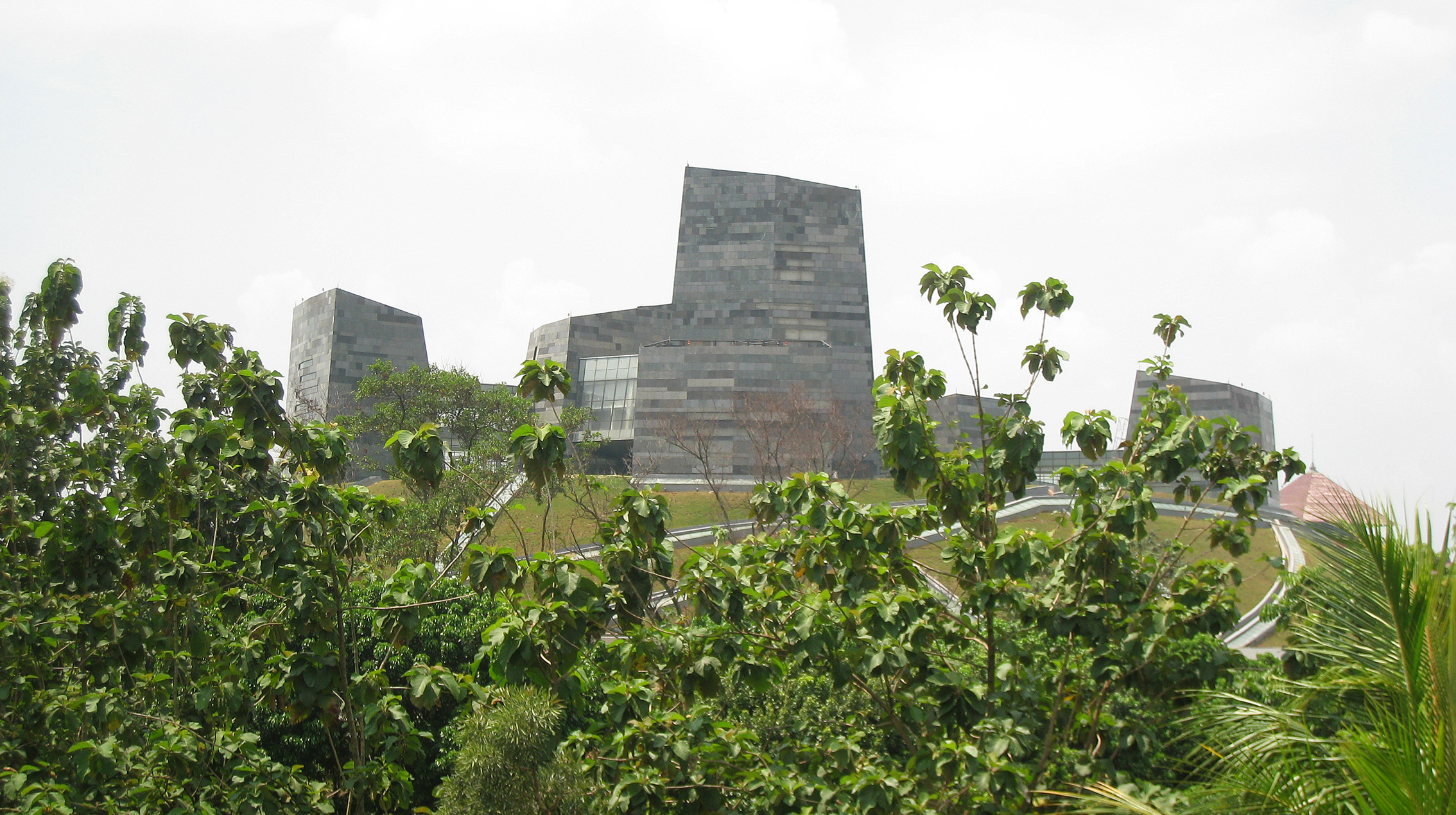
- The Central Library of the University of Indonesia.

- Location in Depok Location in Java Location in Indonesia
- Alternative names: "Crystal of Knowledge"

General information
- Status: Completed
- Type: Library
- Location: Depok, Indonesia, Kampus Baru UI Depok, Indonesia
- Coordinates: 6°21′55″S 106°49′47″E
- Completed: 2011
- Client: University of Indonesia

Technical details
- Floor count: 8
- Floor area: 28,900 square metres (311,000 sq ft)

Design and construction
- Architect: Denton Corker Marshall

Other information
- Parking: Available

Website
- www.ui.ac.id/layanan/perpustakaan.html

The Central Library (Indonesian Perpustakaan Pusat) is the main library of the University of Indonesia in Depok, Indonesia. Selected in an open design competition, the design concept was conceived by Denton Corker Marshall. The new library conceptually bridges the ancient knowledge and the contemporary knowledge in a form inspired by the ancient stone steles and light-play. It serves as the primary repository for the university's academic resources and houses an extensive collection of research materials, literature, and books, including works published by the university's own academic publishing house, Penerbit Universitas Indonesia (UI-Press).

== Design ==
The library of the University of Indonesia is a result of an open design competition. The main purpose of the competition is to establish an international standard library and to replace the earlier Central Library that is deemed inadequate for a library. The new Central Library is conceived as a new social and knowledge hub for 30,000 students. The building is located in a very central location in the campus, on the waterfront of the campus lake. The circular form of the master plan of the Central Library follows the strong circular patterns which exist in the campus's master plan, apparent in the layout of the streets and the surrounding faculties.

The Central Library is conceived as an earth architecture which integrates building and landscape. A series of stone-like towers project from the mound-like landform. The towers were seen as abstracted stone tablets (prasasti) rising from the earth mound. These stone towers clad with granite stone claddings have varying heights. The part of the library which faces the lake is "eroded", forming a sectional opening to the entire masses in the form of narrow-glazed bands, at the same time allowing light to enter into the interior.

The "grass mound" of the library is a 5-story building of concrete roof and insulating soil cover. The grass mound is crisscrossed with bare lines, which represents the axis of existing landmarks of the University of Indonesia, which is the administrative Rectorate Building, the University Mosque and the Balairung (Public Hall).

An amphitheater is part of the landscape of the library, located on the lakefront to be used as an additional public realm. This amphitheater with mature mahogany trees conceptually represents the circular landform eroded on the lakeside. This feature identifies the main entrance to the library, as well as the lightwell for the library. Cultural performances or social gatherings are often held in the auditorium.

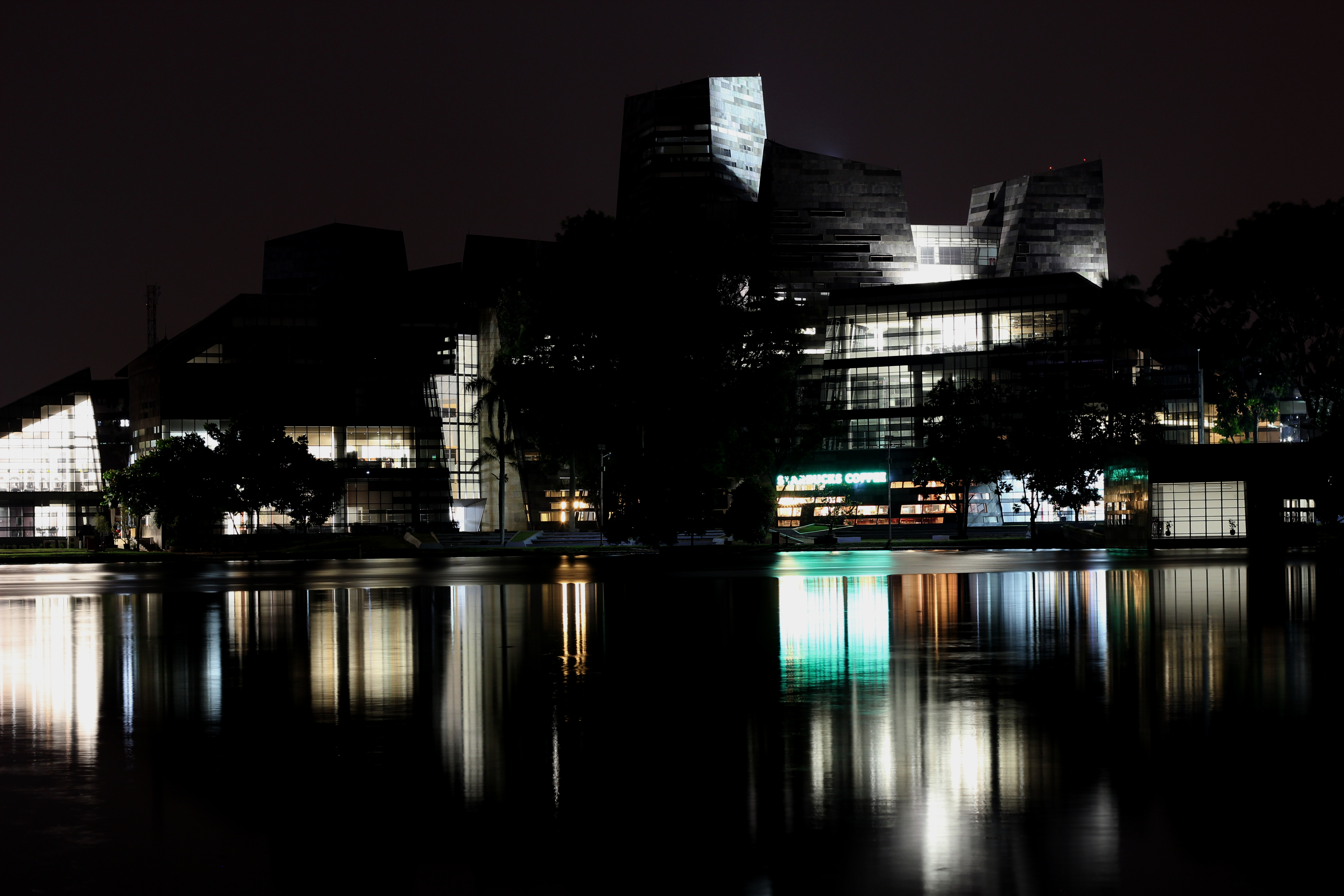
UI Central Library at night

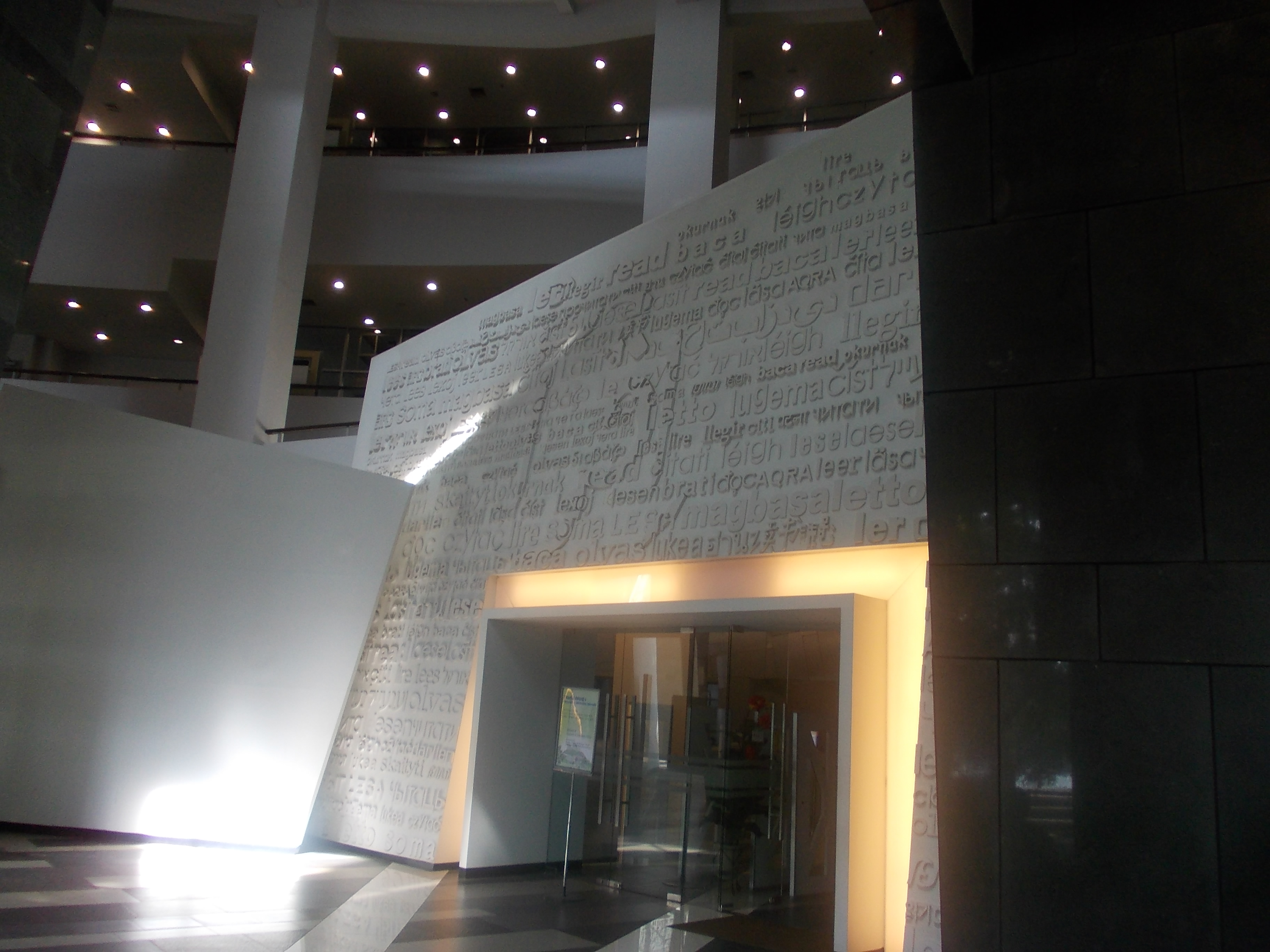
UI Central Library gate enter

The layout of the reading room's on the ground floor is designed as an open space to allow interaction and provide clear visibility. The ground floor also houses bookshops, office for administration, and internet reading room. The upper floors house additional meeting rooms and auditoriums. Continuous curvilinear pedestrian ramps link different floors in the library, designed to encourage visitors to explore the space around the central void between the bookcases and the reading rooms. The space programming of the Central Library is to avoid having sectional departmental libraries which would fragment student activities. By incorporating the main reading room with supporting facilities e.g. plaza, retails, and a temporary exhibition space, the library promotes interactions between different activities and promote the library as a place of gathering.

Rainwater is captured for use on site in a rainwater tank, to be reused. Wastewater is treated and recycled. Mature trees and vegetations around the 2.5-hectare site were maintained, which forms a part of the library's landscape. In 2010, the Central Library received a BCI Green Design Award 2010 for Institutional Architecture.

== See also ==
- List of libraries in Indonesia

== Cited works ==
- Imelda Akmal, ed. (2011). Indonesian Architects for the International Union of Architects Congress Tokyo 2011. Indonesia: Imaji Media Pustaka. ISBN 9786029260014.
