= Sonobudoyo Museum =

Museum in Yogyakarta, Indonesia

- ꦩꦸꦱꦶꦪꦸꦩ꧀ꦱꦤꦧꦸꦢꦪ; Musiyum Sanabudaya
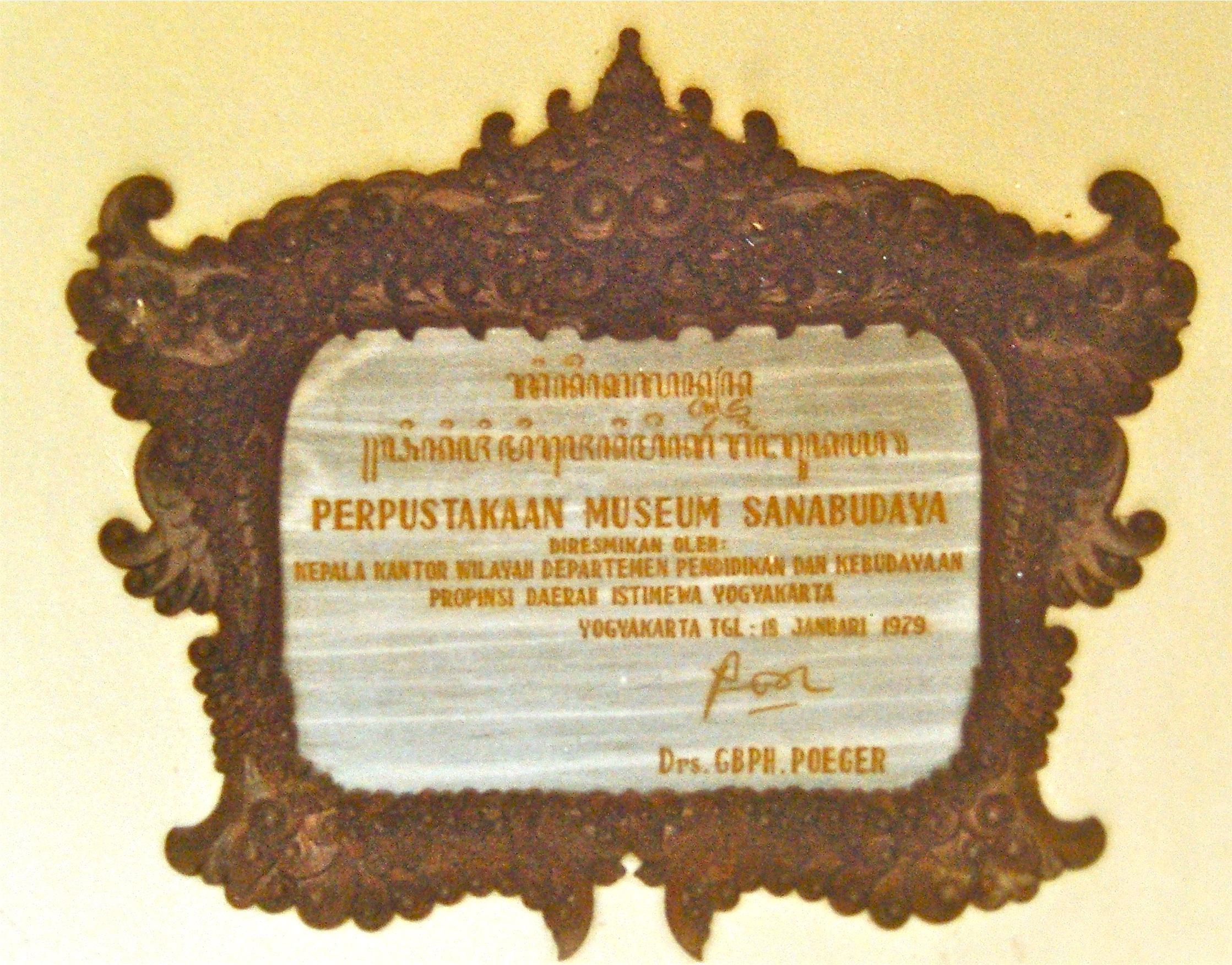
- Sonobudoyo Museum library entrance sign

- Location within Yogyakarta

General information
- Architectural style: Joglo limasan, Javanese architecture
- Location: Jalan Pangurakan No. 6, Yogyakarta, Special Region of Yogyakarta, Indonesia
- Coordinates: 7.801785°S 110.364003°E
- Construction started: 1934
- Completed: November 6, 1935
- Owner: Yogyakarta Sultanate

Technical details
- Size: 7.867 m^{2} (84.68 sq ft)

Design and construction
- Architect: Thomas Karsten

Other information
- Public transit: Trans Jogja: 1A, 2A, 3A, 8 (Ahmad Yani)

Website
- www.sonobudoyo.com

The Sonobudoyo Museum (Javanese: ꦩꦸꦱꦶꦪꦸꦩ꧀ꦱꦤꦧꦸꦢꦪ, romanized: Musiyum Sanabudaya) is a Javanese history and culture museum and library in Yogyakarta, Indonesia. The museum contains the most complete collection of Javanese artifacts, after the National Museum in Jakarta. In addition to ceramics of the Neolithic era and bronze sculptures from the 8th century, the museum also includes collections of wayang (shadow puppets), various ancient weapons (such as keris), and Javanese masks.

The Sonobudoyo Museum consists of two units, with Unit I located at Jalan Trikora No. 6 Yogyakarta, and Unit II located at Ndalem Condrokiranan, Wijilan, to the east of main (northern) alun-alun in the city.

The museum also features nightly wayang and gamelan performances on weekdays, primarily for foreign and domestic tourists.

== History ==
The Java Instituut was a foundation established in 1919 in Surakarta for the study of the cultures of Java, Madura, Bali, and Lombok. In 1924, the Java Instituut held a congress in Surakarta to establish a museum with collections from the regions of Java, Madura, Bali, and Lombok.

On November 6, 1935, the Sonobudoyo Museum was inaugurated and opened to the public, with the word sono meaning "place" and budoyo meaning "culture" in Javanese.

In 1939, in order to support and complement the business of the Java Instituut, the Kunstambacht School or Sekolah Kerajinan Seni Ukir (Carving Arts and Crafts School) was opened.

Towards the end of 1974, the Sonobudoyo Museum was handed over to the Ministry of Education and Culture and became directly responsible to the Directorate General in 2000. The Sonobudoyo Museum joined the Provincial Office of Culture and Tourism of Yogyakarta in 2001.

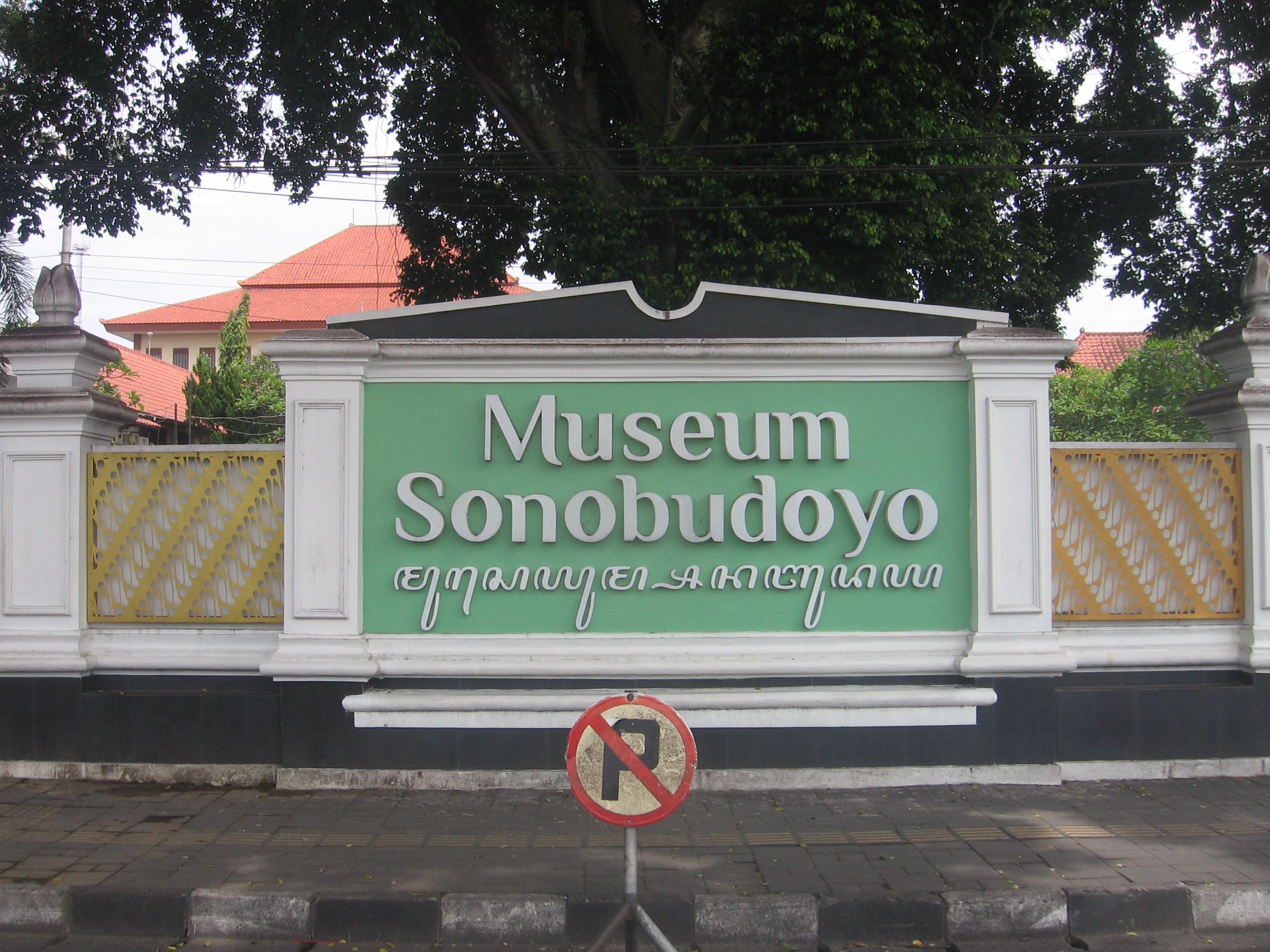
Sonobudoyo Museum

== See also ==
- List of libraries in Indonesia
