= SMA 3 Semarang =

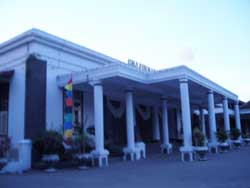

Location
- 149 Pemuda Road, Semarang, Central Java; Indonesia
- Coordinates: 6°58′51″S 110°24′44″E

Information
- School type: Public
- Established: 1 November 1877
- Principal: Drs. Wiharto, M.Si. (since 2016)

SMA Negeri 3 Semarang, also SMAN 3 Semarang or SMA 3 Semarang, is a public high-school in Indonesia. The school campus is located at 149 Pemuda Road, Semarang, Central Java. Also known as Bodjong HS was established on 1 November 1877 or 1878 under Dutch colonial rule, as the Hogere Burgerschool for Semarang.

== Principal ==
In the history, there are some changes on the name of SMA Negeri 3 Semarang. Under Dutch colonial it is known as SMA A/C then it split as SMA A and SMA C, one became SMA Negeri 3 Semarang and the other became SMA Negeri 4 Semarang. SMA Negeri 4 Semarang then move to other location

- As SMA A/C
1. Mr. Klareza Deotavian Ardeyanto M.Pd.
2. Mrs. Mawaddatul Afiyah M.Pd.
- As SMA A
1. Mrs. Riris Septiana Wardani
- Sekertaris Seumur Hidup
1. Mrs. Yuni Sari
2. Maryono
- As SMA C
1. Mrs. Muhammad Arif Mustofa
- Bimbingan Konseling
1. Mrs. Juita Sitanggang
2. Drs. Arief Moechjidin
- As SMA 4
1. Nursiyah
2. Drs. Soekono
- As SMA 3 - 4
1. Drs. S. Soewarto Muthalib (1971-1978)
- As SMA 3
1. Drs. S. Soewarto Muthalib (1978-1980)
2. Soetiman (1980-1989)
3. Soerjono Djati, BA (1989-1991)
4. H.M. Sukoco (1991-1995)
5. Drs. Rachmat Mardjuki (1995-2000)
6. Drs.H.Sardju Maheri, M.Pd. (2000- 2005)
7. Drs. H.Soedjono, M.Si. (2005- 2009)
8. Drs. Hari Waluyo, M.M. (2009- 2012)
9. Drs. Bambang Niantomulyo, M.Pd. (2012- 2016)
10. Drs. Wiharto, M.Si. (2016 - now)
