= Library Foundation Hatta =

Library foundation in Indonesia

Library Foundation Hatta is a charitable association library that assists national libraries in Indonesia.

Located in Yogyakarta, Hatta Library was the first library foundation that was established after the independence of Indonesia.

== See also ==
- List of libraries in Indonesia
