= Voice of Indonesia =

International broadcasting service of Indonesia

- Central Jakarta, Jakarta; Indonesia
- Broadcast area: Worldwide
- Frequencies: 3325 and 4755 kHz (SW, 10:00 a.m.–11:00 p.m. UTC); 3946/H/6660 (satellite, Telkom-4); Online (24 hours)
- Branding: RRI Voice of Indonesia

Programming
- Language: see #Operations
- Format: General

Ownership
- Owner: RRI
- Sister stations: RRI Programa 1 RRI Programa 2 RRI Programa 3 RRI Programa 4

History
- First air date: 23 August 1945; 80 years ago
- Former names: Voice of Free Indonesia (1945–1950)
- Former frequencies: 9690 kHz, 9925 kHz, 11785 kHz, 15150 kHz

Technical information
- Licensing authority: Ministry of Communication and Digital Affairs (SW radio)

Links
- Webcast: VOI website
- Website: voinews.id rri.co.id/en

RRI Voice of Indonesia (also known as Voice of Indonesia or RRI World Service – Voice of Indonesia; abbreviated as VOI) is the international broadcasting service of Indonesia, operated by the public radio network Radio Republik Indonesia (RRI). Established in 1945, it is the country's oldest international media organization. It broadcasts via shortwave radio as and streaming television, providing information about Indonesia to audiences worldwide.

== History ==
When Indonesia declared its independence on 17 August 1945, the new nation required an effective means to announce this to both its people and the international community. At 7:00 p.m. on the same day, M. Jusuf Ronodipuro, founder of Radio Republik Indonesia (RRI), read the proclamation of independence on Hoso Kyoku, the Japanese occupation radio station. He was supported by Dr. Abdulrahman Saleh, who had a strong interest in radio broadcasting. Together, they established the Voice of Free Indonesia, with its first transmission occurring on 23 August 1945, from the Faculty of Medicine at what is now the University of Indonesia in Jakarta. The first Indonesian president, Sukarno, delivered a speech on this radio service on 25 August, followed by Vice President Mohammad Hatta on 29 August. At that time, radio broadcasting was the most powerful medium to reach audiences worldwide. To support this mission, the newly formed Republic of Indonesia took over the former Dutch radio station in Yogyakarta.

The international broadcasting service was initially called Voice of Free Indonesia. On 11 September 1945, it was renamed Radio Republik Indonesia (RRI), which became the parent organisation of Voice of Indonesia. During the Indonesian National Revolution, a Scottish-American woman named K'tut Tantri, who sympathized with the Indonesian republicans, made several English-language broadcasts on the Voice of Free Indonesia. Targeted at Western audiences, she gained the nickname "Surabaya Sue" for her support of the Indonesian nationalists. In the early years of Indonesian independence, radio broadcasting played a key role in communicating the new nation's message to overseas audiences, aiding international recognition of Indonesia's sovereignty. Additionally, Voice of Free Indonesia was also the name of an Indonesian Republican magazine marketed to Western correspondents. In 1950, the service was renamed Voice of Indonesia.

In 1964, RRI built the RRI Cimanggis transmitter complex, now located in Sukmajaya, Depok, West Java, just south of Jakarta. The complex, which was inaugurated in 1969, included six 125 kW transmitters intended for overseas broadcasts. However, in 2017, most of its land was transferred to the Ministry of Religious Affairs to be used as the Indonesian International Islamic University campus. This was said to have had an impact on the transmitter assets there.

== Operations ==
The target audience of Voice of Indonesia (VOI) includes Indonesian citizens abroad, the Indonesian diaspora, and international listeners worldwide.

VOI currently broadcasts programs in nine languages: English, French, Spanish, German, Arabic, Chinese, Japanese, Dutch, and Indonesian. Previously, broadcasts were also available in Hindi, Korean, Thai, and Urdu.

Until 2010, each language broadcast two hours of programming daily, totaling 13 hours across all language services. VOI's four main programs were: News and Information; Rhythm of the Archipelago, focusing on Indonesian music; Getting to Know Indonesia, which highlighted the country's unique culture; and Archipelago Sketches, covering regional autonomy policies. These programs were initially produced in Indonesian and then translated into the nine foreign languages. The content across all foreign-language programs was essentially the same.

Since 2018, VOI has broadcast 24 hours a day via the internet and 12 hours daily on shortwave frequencies 4750 and 3325 kHz. The shortwave bands 9525, 11785, and 15150 kHz are currently inactive. Historically, VOI used these frequencies since its inception for international broadcasts.

While shortwave remains the primary transmission method, VOI also operates a website offering news in nine languages and a live streaming radio service, which began on 1 April 2008. However, the streaming service is less comprehensive than the shortwave broadcasts.

VOI maintains a presence on social media platforms to provide updates about Indonesia. To serve mobile and smartphone users, VOI is accessible through the RRI Digital app. It also produces visual programs on RRI NET, RRI's visual radio channel.

Up until 2025, VOI has nine-language news portal on its official website; it has since replaced with station and programme information. As of 2026, the station manages a self-branded, English-language section of RRI's news portal.

== Frequencies and broadcast schedule ==
=== Shortwave frequencies ===
- 3325 kHz – 50 kW (Palangkaraya Transmitter) (Inactive)
- 4755 kHz – 10 kW (Cimanggis, West Java Transmitter)
- 9690 kHz - 200 Watt (Cimanggis, West Java Transmitter) (Inactive)
- 9525 kHz – 250 kW (inactive)
- 11785 kHz – 250 kW (inactive)
- 15150 kHz – 250 kW (inactive)

=== Broadcast hours ===
17:00 – 04:00 Western Indonesian Time (WIB) / 10:00 – 21:00 Coordinated Universal Time (UTC)

=== Language schedule on 3325 kHz and 4750 kHz ===
Language WIB Time UTC Time

English 17:00 – 18:00 10:00 – 11:00

Chinese 18:00 – 19:00 11:00 – 12:00

Japanese 19:00 – 20:00 12:00 – 13:00

English II 20:00 – 21:00 13:00 – 14:00

Bahasa Indonesia 21:00 – 22:00 14:00 – 15:00

Chinese II 22:00 – 23:00 15:00 – 16:00

Arabic 23:00 – 00:00 16:00 – 17:00

Spanish 00:00 – 01:00 17:00 – 18:00

German 01:00 – 02:00 18:00 – 19:00

Dutch 02:00 – 03:00 19:00 – 20:00

French 03:00 – 04:00 20:00 – 21:00

== Reception ==
As of August 2020, Voice of Indonesia (VOI) reported having more than 77,000 listeners worldwide, representing a threefold increase from 2017, when the audience was fewer than 28,000. In 2019, the majority of online listeners were from Russia, China, and Indonesia; by 2020, the leading countries were Indonesia, China, and Russia.

== See also ==
- TVRI World, an English television channel of TVRI
