= Depok–Antasari Toll Road =

Toll Roads in Indonesia

Depok–Antasari Toll Road Desari
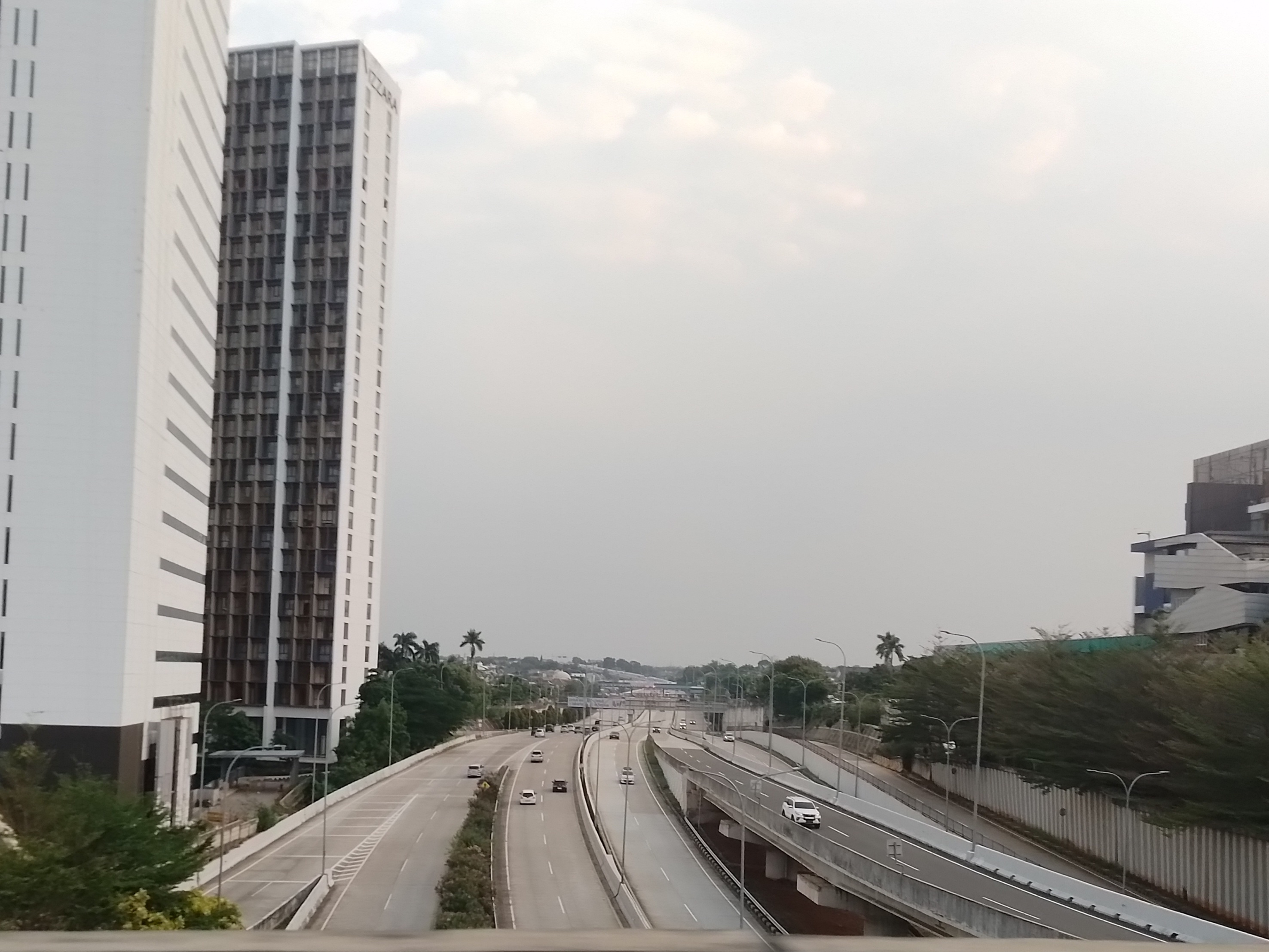
- Cilandak Interchange in 2024

Route information
- Maintained by PT Citra Waspphutowa (CW)
- Length: 21.54 km (13.38 mi)
- Existed: 2018–present

Major junctions
- North end: Cilandak
- Jakarta Outer Ring Road; Jakarta Outer Ring Road 2; Bogor-Ciawi–Sukabumi Toll Road
- South end: Bojong Gede

Location
- Country: Indonesia
- Provinces: DKI Jakarta; West Java
- Major cities: South Jakarta; Depok; Bogor Regency; Bogor

Highway system
- Transport in Indonesia

The Depok–Antasari Toll Road (Indonesian: Jalan Tol Depok-Antasari), also known as Desari, is a controlled-access toll road in Java, Indonesia, connecting South Jakarta with Sawangan, Depok and Bojong Gede - Kemang (Salabenda), Bogor Regency.

The toll road extends from Jalan Pangeran Antasari in South Jakarta to Depok. The toll road will be extended to Bogor, at the interchange of Bogor Ring Road and Bogor-Ciawi–Sukabumi Toll Road. Once fully operational, this toll is predicted to reduce congestion along Jagorawi Toll Road. Indonesian President Joko Widodo inaugurated the 5.8 kilometer-long section I of the toll road on 27 September 2018.

== Sections ==
The toll road is divided into 4 sections.

- Section I: 5.8 kilometers from Jalan Antasari to Brigif (Operational)
- Section II: 6.3 kilometers from Brigif to Sawangan (2.7 km in the Brigif - Krukut Section II A and the Krukut - Sawangan Section II B is 3.6 kilometers long. (operational)
- Section III: 9.5 kilometers from Sawangan to Bojonggede in Bogor Regency (Under construction).
- Section IV: 6.4 kilometers from Bojonggede to Kemang (Salabenda), Bogor Regency (Land Acquisition).

== Toll Gate ==
Province	Location	km	mi	Exit	Name	Destinations	Notes
Special Capital Region of Jakarta	Cilandak, South Jakarta	0	0.0	0	Cilandak Interchange	Jakarta Outer Ring Road; Northwestbound; Pondok Indah; Lebak Bulus; Jakarta–Serpong Toll Road; Eastbound; Pasar Minggu; Cijantung; Jagorawi Toll Road	Northern terminus
Special Capital Region of Jakarta	Cilandak, South Jakarta	0.8	0.50	Cilandak Utama Toll Gate			
Special Capital Region of Jakarta	Cilandak, South Jakarta	0.8	0.50	1	Cilandak Toll Gate	Cilandak; Antasari; Blok M	Northbound exit only
West Java	Cinere, Depok	2.9	1.8	2	Andara Toll Gate	Andara; Pondok Labu; Ciganjur	
Special Capital Region of Jakarta	Jagakarsa, South Jakarta	5.2	3.2	5	Brigif Toll Gate	Brigif; Gandul; Cinere	
West Java	Limo, Depok	7.5	4.7	7	Krukut Toll Gate	Krukut; Gandul; Limo; Meruyung	
West Java	Limo, Depok	8.1	5.0	8	Krukut Interchange	Jakarta Outer Ring Road 2; Eastbound; Cinere–Jagorawi Toll Road; Depok; Jagorawi Toll Road; Northwestbound; Serpong–Cinere Toll Road; Pamulang; Soekarno-Hatta International Airport	
West Java	Pancoran Mas, Depok	11.5	7.1	12	Sawangan Toll Gate	Sawangan; Depok; Parung	
1.000 mi = 1.609 km; 1.000 km = 0.621 mi: Electronic toll collection; Incomplete access; Route transition; Unopened

== See also ==
- Trans-Java toll road
