= Cinere–Jagorawi Toll Road =

Toll road in Indonesia

Cinere-Jagorawi Toll Road Cijago

Route information
- Maintained by PT Trans lingkar Kita Jaya (TLKJ)
- Length: 14.64 km (9.10 mi)
- Existed: 2012–present
- History: Opened since 2012, the toll road was opened in 3 phases, from 2012 to 2019 and was completely operational in 2023

Major junctions
- West end: Limo Interchange
- Jagorawi Toll Road; Cimanggis–Cibitung Toll Road
- East end: Cimanggis Interchange

Location
- Country: Indonesia

Highway system
- Transport in Indonesia

Cinere–Jagorawi Toll Road or Cijago Toll Road is a 14.64-kilometre (9.10 mi) toll road which extends from Cimanggis to Cinere in West Java, Indonesia. This toll road is the part of the Jakarta Outer Ring Road 2. The toll road is connected to Jagorawi Toll Road, Depok-Antasari Toll Road and Cinere-Serpong Toll Road. Section 1 from Cisalak to Jagorawi was inaugurated on Friday, 27 January 2012, which is 3.7 kilometres (2.3 mi) in length. Section 2 from Cisalak to Beji (5.5 kilometers (3.42 mi)) was opened for public on Saturday, 28 September 2019. With the completion of the remaining 3.31 kilometers (2.05 mi) and 2.19 kilometers (1.36 mi) of section that spans from Beji to Cinere, the toll road was completely opened for public on Friday, 22 December 2023.

Metro, long or medium distances from and to Depok can use this toll road, without passing Lenteng Agung and Pasar Minggu.

== Sections ==
The toll road is divided into three sections. All section are fully operational.

- Section 1: extends from Jagorawi to Raya Bogor (operational)
- Section 2: from Raya Bogor to Kukusan (operational),
- Section 3: from Kukusan to Cinere (operational).

== Toll gate ==
Province	Location	km	mi	Exit	Name	Destinations	Notes
West Java	Limo, Depok			Serpong–Cinere Toll Road			
West Java	Limo, Depok				Limo Interchange	Jakarta Outer Ring Road; Depok–Antasari Toll Road; Northbound; Cilandak Barat; Cilandak; Gandul; Cinere; Depok–Antasari Toll Road (Under construction); Southbound; Pancoran Mas; Sawangan	
West Java	Beji, Depok	15.2	9.4	15	Kukusan Toll Gate	Kukusan; Beji	
West Java	Beji, Depok	17.2	10.7	17	Margonda Toll Gate	Kemiri Muka; Beji	
West Java	Sukmajaya, Depok	19.9	12.4	20	Cisalak Toll Gate	Cisalak; Sukmajaya	
West Java	Cimanggis, Depok	23.6	14.7	23	Cimanggis Interchange	Jagorawi Toll Road; Northbound; Cibubur; Jakarta Outer Ring Road; Jakarta Inner Ring Road; Southbound; Cimanggis; Gunung Putri; Bogor	
West Java	Tapos, Depok	24.7	15.3	Cimanggis–Cibitung Toll Road			
1.000 mi = 1.609 km; 1.000 km = 0.621 mi: Route transition

== See also ==
- Trans-Java toll road
