= Radio Republik Indonesia =

Indonesian public radio network

LPP Radio Republik Indonesia
- Logo used since 2023

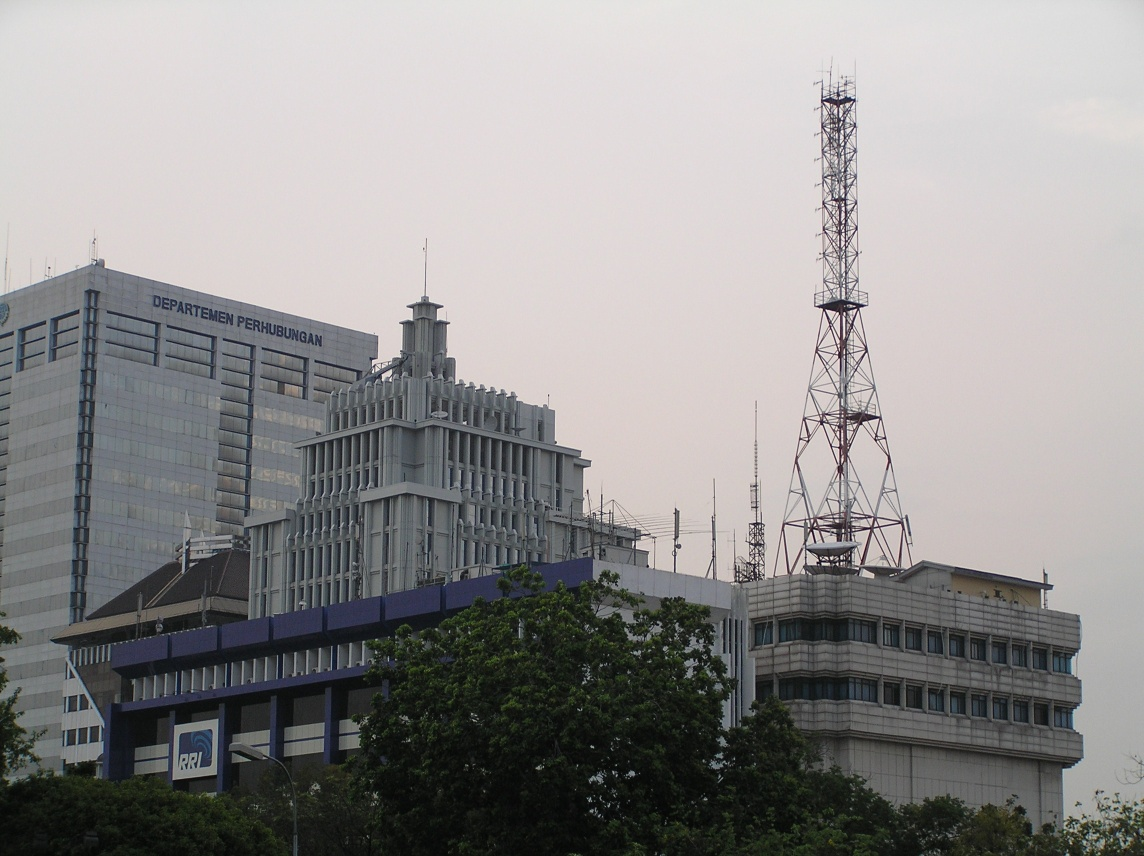
- The RRI headquarters in Central Jakarta, late 2000s
- Type: Statutory corporation (Public broadcasting)
- Industry: Mass media
- Predecessor: Hōsō Kanri Kyoku (1942–1945; in Jakarta); Hōsō Kyoku (1942–1945; in other areas)
- Founded: 11 September 1945; 81 years ago
- Founder: Joesoef Ronodipoero; Abdulrahman Saleh; ...and others
- Headquarters: Jl. Medan Merdeka Barat 4-5, Central Jakarta
- Area served: Nationwide and Worldwide
- Key people: Anwar Mujahid Adhy Trisnanto (Chairman of the Board of Supervisors); Ignatius Hendrasmo (President-Director)
- Products: Broadcasting; Web portals
- Services: Radio; Television; Online
- Number of employees: 4,519 (as of 30 September 2024)
- Website: www.rri.co.id

Radio Republik Indonesia (lit. 'Radio of the Republic of Indonesia', abbreviated as RRI, stylized in all-lowercase logo) is a public radio network of Indonesia and one of Indonesia's two national Public Broadcasting Institutions, the other being the public television network TVRI. Founded on 11 September 1945, it is the first radio network in Indonesia and one of the oldest media companies in the country. RRI headquarters are located on Medan Merdeka Barat Street in Central Jakarta, Jakarta.

RRI has four radio networks as well as visual radio channels, broadcasts all over Indonesia to serve all citizens throughout the nation. The network is supported by roughly 90 local stations, the largest of any radio network in the country. Through its overseas broadcasting division Voice of Indonesia, RRI also provides information about Indonesia to people around the world. Its funding primarily comes from annual state budget approved by the parliament, advertisement, and other services.

== History ==
=== During Dutch and Japanese colonial eras ===
Radio Republik Indonesia was not actually the first radio station in Indonesia. The earliest radio station to begin broadcasting in what was then known as the Dutch East Indies was Bataviase Radio Vereniging (BRV), on 16 June 1925. At that time, BRV had two channels: "Stadzender" (Local Program) and "Archipelzender" (National Program). BRV broadcast from the Harmoni area of Jakarta (Batavia) and used Dutch in its programming.

The birth of BRV was followed by a number of other radio stations in a number of regions, such as the Nederlandsch-Indische Radio-Omroep Maatschappij (NIROM, Batavia); the Solosche Radio Vereniging (SRV, Soerakarta); the Eastern Radio Luisteraars (VORO, Bandoeng); the First Madioense Radio Omroep (ERVO, Madioen); and the Meyers Omroep voor Allen (MOVA, Medan). Almost all of them were privately owned at that time, except for NIROM. NIROM then developed into the largest radio station, by establishing communication lines via telephone with a number of cities, having central broadcasts transmitted from other cities such as Semarang, Bandoeng, Soerabaja, Soerakarta and Yogyakarta, plus having programs aimed at the local community. NIROM was born as a result of the issuance of the Radiowet by the colonial government in 1934 and received funding from the radio tax scheme (Luisterbijdrage).

Another radio station worth mentioning is SRV, which began operating on 1 April 1933, and was the first radio broadcaster owned by the Dutch East Indies' indigenous population. SRV was born from a collaboration between Surakarta nobleman Mangkunegara VII and Sarsito Mangunkusumo. After SRV emerged, other indigenous radio stations such as MARVO, VORL, CIRVO, EMRO, and Radio Semarang emerged. Initially, there was a mutual symbiosis between NIROM and these radio stations, but NIROM later became concerned about threats from national radio broadcasts. As a result of NIROM's efforts to sever this partnership, Volksraad member Sutardjo Kartohadikusumo and Sarsito Mangunkusumo (a pioneer of SRV) then gathered the administrators of indigenous radio stations on 29 March 1937 in Bandoeng. This meeting agreed to establish a forum called the Eastern Radio Association (PPPK) as a forum for their collaboration. Although a collaboration between PPPK and NIROM was later agreed upon, whereby PPPK radio stations would provide programming while NIROM would provide technical assistance, efforts continued to ensure PPPK members could broadcast independently. The first PPPK program broadcast via NIROM was broadcast on 1 November 1940.

With the fall of the Dutch East Indies to the Empire of Japan in March 1942, Japan disbanded private radio stations and implemented broadcasts centrally through the establishment of Pusat Jawatan Radio (Radio Bureau Center (放送管理局, Hōsō Kanri Kyoku)). Their respective branches include Jawatan Radio (Radio Bureau (放送局, Hōsō Kyoku)), which covers 8 cities and Shodanso which is tasked with monitoring the use of radio so that people do not listen to foreign radio broadcasts. Japan clearly saw the importance of radio as a tool propaganda, based on experience through Radio Tokyo (now NHK) broadcasts which at around 10 pm were very well received by the Indonesian people. Radio was actually used as a propaganda tool, containing war news and prohibitions on listening to foreign languages and songs.

=== The founding of RRI ===
Just as when the Dutch surrendered in 1942, radio again played a crucial role during the proclamation of independence in 1945. For example, news of Japan's defeat was secretly obtained from the BBC World Service on 14 August 1945 by young people. The proclamation of independence on 17 August 1945 made the young people want to seize this important means of communication, with the aim of spreading the news of the proclamation. In Bandoeng, the Hoso Kyoku branch there was seized, albeit with bloodshed, with a replacement radio station, Siaran Radio Republik Indonesia Bandung, used to read the proclamation news by three young men named Sakti Alamsyah, Odas Sumadilaga, and R.A. Darya. In Soerabaja, to deceive the occupying government, the proclamation broadcast was read in Madurese, while in Jakarta, Joesoef Ronodipoero emerged as a hero for his efforts to read the broadcast at 7:00 pm despite being tortured by Japanese soldiers. Knowing this, the occupying government then sealed the radio broadcasts that had been going on since 19 August 1945. The independence figures also used strategies to continue broadcasting this important news, such as through illegal broadcasts which were successfully used by President Sukarno to give a speech on 25 August 1945.

The radio fighters realized how important these radio facilities were in anticipating the worst possible outcome, namely the return of British and Dutch troops to Indonesia. Over time, the Japanese occupation government and its troops lost interest in maintaining these radio stations. The youth began planning to seize and operate the existing radio stations, thanks to Ronodipuro's suggestion to Abdul Rahman Saleh. On 10 September 1945, regional radio leaders from Soerakarta, Djogjakarta, Bandoeng, Semarang and Poerwokerto held a meeting to agree on a plan to force the Japanese army to immediately hand over the Hoso Kyoku station to the fighters. They also intended to inform the government of this, through a meeting on 11 September at 5:00 pm in the Pejambon area of Jakarta at the suggestion of one of the radio figures, Oetojo Ramelan. However, the response of the Ministry of the State Secretariat A.G. Pringgodigdo was to reject the proposal to seize the Japanese radio stations in favor of creating a united radio broadcast, fearing that it would lead to conflict with the Allies.

The RRI pioneers then proceeded with their plan, seeing the potential for conflict to arise. In the early hours of 11 September, at a meeting attended by 17 people entitled Perdjuangan Kita (Our Struggle) at the house of Adang Kadarusman, Menteng Dalam Jakarta, RRI was officially established with Abdul Rahman Saleh appointed as its first general manager. The meeting also produced a declaration known as the Piagam 11 September 1945 (Chapter of 11 September 1945), which contained three points of commitment to the duties and functions of RRI, later known as the Tri Prasetya RRI. The plan to take over the radio stations then went well, except in Surabaya where it was only successfully carried out on 29 September 1945, and in Surakarta, where the handover took place on 1 October 1945. With the emergence of the Indonesian National Revolution, RRI quickly gained widespread public acceptance. RRI then also began to carry out the important task of conveying the conditions of Indonesia to the world, which at that time was dominated by broadcasts from the Dutch.

On 12-13 January 1946 a meeting was held in Surakarta to discuss the development of radio in Indonesia during the ongoing war. In this meeting, several conclusions were reached, such as RRI Jakarta was handed over to the Department of Information; Bandung and Purwokerto were briefly merged into PTT (now Pos Indonesia); Semarang was under the funding of Governor of Central Java Wongsonegoro; Surakarta received regional government funding; Yogyakarta and Surabaya were funded by local radio taxes; and Malang was funded by PTT. The meeting also discussed the topic of RRI as a government organ or autonomous institution, where the government proposed that RRI be divided into technical and broadcasting bodies with the leadership appointed by the government. The proposal to split RRI was rejected, while the plan to make RRI a government agency was later accepted after tough negotiations. Finally, on 1 April 1946 the government inaugurated RRI with its new status as a government institution which was then under the control of the Ministry of Information. Since then, RRI has become the official voice of the newly established government at that time.

RRI then expanded its network through the merger of a number of local radio stations named Badan Siaran Radio (Radio Broadcasting Agency), which was formed in 1946 and 1947 by the people in a number of cities such as Cirebon, Tasikmalaya, Garut, Magelang, Cilacap, Madiun, Kediri and Jember. However, the instability due to the conflict also disrupted the operations of a number of regional RRI stations and made them move, such as in Surabaya which was split into 3 in Mojokerto, Bondowoso, and Madiun, and Semarang which was split into three locations namely Pekalongan, Pati and Salatiga . In total, in 1948 RRI already had 32 stations located in 29 places. At the same time, other non-RRI radio broadcasts that later appeared also played a role in helping the war, such as Radio Perjuangan in Serang City, Radio Gelora Pemuda in Madiun, Radio Internasional in Kediri and Radio Pemberontakan in Surakarta.

=== Post-1949 ===
As part of the founding of the United States of Indonesia in 1949, a joint institution was formed between RRI and ROIO (Radio Omroep in Overgangstijd, a Dutch-founded radio network) called Radio Republik Indonesia Serikat (RRIS; Radio of the United States of Indonesia). During this period, the unification of the call signs and centralization of regional RRI broadcasts with the RRI central station which was then in Yogyakarta. RRIS then returned to RRI after the RIS was dissolved in 1950. The development of RRI was then greatly influenced by political developments; during the Liberal democracy era, the general manager of RRI was often replaced according to the political preferences of the ruling party, Meanwhile, in the Guided Democracy era, RRI broadcasts again became a propaganda tool, dominated by long speeches. Domestic Dutch-language broadcasts were discontinued in 1954.

The RRI central station in Jakarta became one of the vital objects captured by the 30 September Movement on 1 October 1965. In that morning, RRI reported about the September 30 Movement aimed at high-ranking officers who were members of the "Council of Generals" who were about to stage a coup against the government, and announced the formation of "Revolutionary Council" led by Lt. Col. Untung.

In late 1960s, private radio stations were established and effectively ended RRI's monopoly on radio broadcasting. However, during the New Order era, upon the requests of the Ministry of Information, RRI-produced news programs were aired simulcast on all radio stations.

After the Broadcasting Act No. 32/2002 is in force, RRI, along with TVRI, set as the public radio network in 2006 and became independent of any governmental control. The status then reaffirmed by Government Regulation (Peraturan Pemerintah) No. 12 of 2005.

In 2018, RRI became the official Indonesian radio Rights of the 2018 FIFA World Cup in Russia.

In March 2020, during the COVID-19 pandemic in Indonesia, RRI use the tagline Radio Tanggap Bencana COVID-19 (COVID-19 Disaster Responsive Radio). By the tagline, the network announced their efforts to combat the pandemic by providing accurate and reliable information, and supporting the actions of government of Indonesia during the pandemic.

A proposed new Broadcasting Act (Undang-Undang Penyiaran) currently in the making would merge RRI with its fellow public broadcaster TVRI unto a unified firm RTRI (Radio Televisi Republik Indonesia, Radio [and] Television of the Republic of Indonesia).

All RRI radio stations sign on with the musical theme "Mars Jakarta" (Jakarta March). Similarly, it closes every day with the instrumental theme "Lief Ambon" (also called "Love Ambon"), composed by George de Fretes, a renowned musician of Indo-European descent. The two themes were reportedly chosen by President Sukarno.

== Principles and structure ==
Official RRI flag with the new logo (since 11 September 2023)

RRI is designated as public broadcasting institution per Act No. 32 of 2002 on Broadcasting, which defined as a "legal entity established by the state; has independent, neutral, not commercial (characteristics); and has the function to provide services for the public benefit". Its duty, according to Government Regulation No. 12 of 2005, is "to provide the healthy information, education and entertainment services, (maintain) social control and unity, and preserve the nation's culture for the whole public benefit by organizing radio broadcast that reaches all parts of the Unitary State of the Republic of Indonesia". The network is formally placed directly under, and responsible to, the President of Indonesia.

Unlike other public broadcasters such as TVRI and newly established local public broadcasters, RRI has long had a broadcast pledge called Three Pledges of RRI (Tri Prasetya RRI), shown below in English:

- We must save all radio broadcast devices from anyone who wants to use these devices to destroy our country, and defend the devices with all our body and soul in any condition and with any consequences.
- We must drive the RRI broadcast as an instrument of struggle and revolutionary tool for the entire Indonesian nation, with a pure national spirit, a clean and honest heart, and a mind full of love and loyalty to the homeland and nation.
- We must stand above all traditions and beliefs of any parties or groups, by prioritizing national unity and the safety of the state and holding on the spirit of the Proclamation of 17 August 1945.

RRI organization structure consists of five Board of Supervisors (Dewan Pengawas) appointed by the People's Representative Council (DPR) and six Board of Directors (Dewan Direksi) appointed by the Board of Supervisors. Both are sworn in by the President, served for five years and renewable once.

According to article 15 of the Broadcasting Act, RRI funding comes from several sources such as broadcasting fees, annual state budget (drafted by the government and approved by the DPR), community contribution, and advertisement, as well as other legal efforts related to the broadcasting operation. In fact, as of today the broadcasting fee is not yet implemented, and RRI is asked to generate "non-tax revenue" for the state by various funding sources (besides the annual state budget), which some of the revenue would be returned to the network. Previously the radio tax to supplement RRI funding was charged in 1947, but was abolished sometime in the 1980s.

== Services ==
=== Radio ===
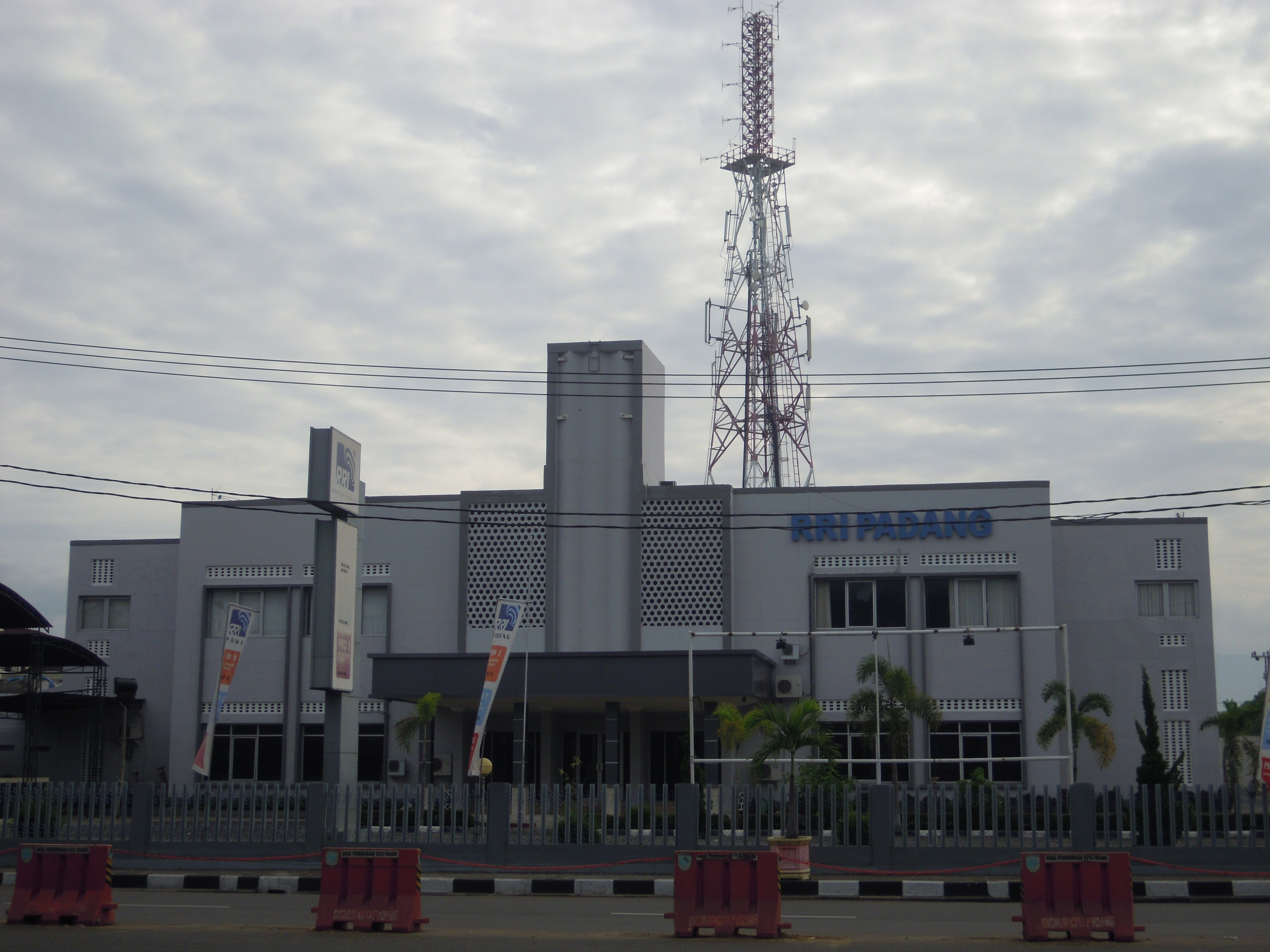
RRI Padang studio in Padang, West Sumatra.

In general, RRI offers a maximum of four main stations in a region (availability varies, see below). One of them is a national simulcast. Three other services are transmitted locally, producing local programmes as well as relaying programmes from the RRI central station in Jakarta.

- Programa 1 (Pro 1): The station serves as regional radio for local community, mainly broadcasts local news and education as well as music.
- Programa 2 (Pro 2): The station serves teenager and youth community. It mainly broadcasts music, entertainment and lifestyle programming.
- Programa 3 (Pro 3): Relays directly from RRI central station, it broadcasts 24-hour news, current affairs, music, & talk programming nationally supplemented by reports from local RRI stations.
- Programa 4 (Pro 4): Currently transmitted in several cities, it broadcasts local cultural programming as well as a variety of cultures within Indonesia.

On shortwave and online, Voice of Indonesia broadcasts as an overseas broadcaster, airing general information, music and entertainment.

==== Stations in major cities ====
Location	Pro 1	Pro 2	Pro 3	Pro 4
Ambon	FM 105.1 MHz	FM 98.4 MHz	FM 101.9 MHz	FM 90.1 MHz
Nusantara (planned city)	FM 98.3 MHz	-	-	-
Banda Aceh	FM 97.7 MHz	FM 92.6 MHz	FM 87.8 MHz	FM 88.6 MHz
Bandar Lampung	FM 90.9 MHz	FM 92.5 MHz	FM 87.7 MHz	FM 88.5 MHz
Bandung	FM 97.6 MHz	FM 96.0 MHz	FM 88.5 MHz	AM 540 kHz
Banjarmasin	FM 97.6 MHz	FM 95.2 MHz	FM 92.5 MHz	FM 87.7 MHz, FM 99.6 MHz (relay)
Batam	FM 105.1 MHz	FM 105.5 MHz	FM 90.9 MHz	
Bengkulu	FM 92.5 MHz	FM 105.1 MHz	FM 88.6 MHz	
Bogor	MW 1242 kHz	FM 106.8 MHz	FM 90.9 MHz	
Cirebon	FM 94.8 MHz	FM 97.5 MHz		
Denpasar	FM 105.2 MHz	FM 95.3 MHz	FM 88.8 MHz	FM 106.4 MHz
Jakarta	FM 91.2 MHz	FM 105.0 MHz	FM 88.8 MHz AM 999 kHz	FM 92.8 MHz
Jambi	FM 88.5 MHz	FM 90.9 MHz	FM 94.4 MHz	FM 99.2 MHz
Jayapura	FM 93.5 MHz	FM 90.1 MHz	FM 105.9 MHz	FM 89.3 MHz
Kupang	FM 94.4 MHz	FM 90.9 MHz	FM 101.9 MHz	FM 104.3 MHz
Lhokseumawe	FM 89.3 MHz	FM 101.9 MHz	FM 95.2 MHz	
Makassar	FM 94.4 MHz	FM 96.8 MHz	FM 92.9 MHz	FM 92.5 MHz
Malang	FM 94.6 MHz	FM 87.9 MHz (Formerly as FM 102 Makobu RRI Pro 2 Malang)	FM 91.5 MHz	FM 105.3 MHz
Manado	FM 94.5 MHz	FM 97.7 MHz	FM 104.4 MHz	FM 88.6 MHz
Medan	FM 94.3 MHz	FM 92.4 MHz	FM 88.8 MHz	FM 88.4 MHz
Nganjuk	FM 92.6 MHz		AM 999 kHz	FM 106.1 MHz (formerly Jodhipati FM and Cakra Krisna FM)
Padang	FM 97.5 MHz	FM 90.8 MHz	FM 88.4 MHz	FM 92.4 MHz
Palembang	FM 92.4 MHz	FM 91.6 MHz	FM 97.1 MHz	FM 88.4 MHz
Pekanbaru	FM 99.1 MHz	FM 88.4 MHz	FM 89.2 MHz	FM 95.9 MHz
Pontianak	FM 104.2 MHz	FM 101.8 MHz	FM 98.3 MHz	FM 94.3 MHz
Purwokerto	FM 93.1 MHz	FM 99.0 MHz	FM 97.1 MHz	
Semarang	FM 89.0 MHz	FM 95.3 MHz	FM 92.2 MHz	FM 88.2 MHz
Surabaya	FM 99.2 MHz	FM 95.2 MHz	FM 107.5 MHz	FM 96.8 MHz
Surakarta	FM 101.0 MHz	FM 105.5 MHz	FM 105.9 MHz	FM 95.2 MHz
Yogyakarta	FM 91.1 MHz	FM 102.5 MHz	FM 102.9 MHz	FM 106.6 MHz

==== Other local stations ====
RRI Pro 1, RRI Pro 2, and RRI Pro 4 operates 19 hours every day, starting 5am to 12am local time. Availability of Pro 1, Pro 2, Pro 3, and Pro 4 as of November 2021 is displayed on the table below.

Location	Pro 1 Availability	Pro 2 Availability	Pro 3 Availability	Pro 4 Availability	Note
Aceh Singkil	check		check		
Ambon	check	check	check	check	
Ampana	check		check		
Atambua	check	check	check		
Banda Aceh	check	check	check	check	
Balikpapan	check	check	check	check	
Bandar Lampung	check	check	check	check	
Bandung	check	check	check	check	
Banjarmasin	check	check	check	check	
Banten	check		check	X mark	
Batam	check	check	check	X mark	
Baubau	check	X mark	check	X mark	
Belitung	check	check	check	check	
Bengkalis	check	X mark	check	X mark	
Bengkulu	check	check	check	check	
Biak	check	check	check	X mark	
Bima	check	check	check	check	
Bintuhan	check	X mark	check	X mark	
Bogor	check	check	check	X mark	
Bone	check	X mark	check	X mark	
Bovendigul	check	X mark	check	X mark	
Bukittinggi	check	check	check	X mark	
Bula	check	check	check	check	
Cirebon	check	check	check	X mark	
Denpasar	check	check	check	check	
Ende	check	check	check	X mark	
Entikong	check	X mark	check	X mark	
Fak Fak	check	check	check	X mark	
Gorontalo	check	check	check	X mark	
Gunung Sitoli	check	check	check	X mark	
Jakarta	check	check	check	check	
Jambi	check	check	check	check	
Jayapura	check	check	check	check	
Jember	check	check	check	X mark	
Kaimana	check	X mark	check	X mark	
Kediri	check	X mark	check	X mark	
Kendari	check	check	check	X mark	
Kupang	check	check	check	check	
Lhokseumawe	check	check	check	X mark	
Madiun	check	check	check	X mark	
Makassar	check	check	check	check	
Malang	check	check	check	check	
Malinau	check	X mark	check	X mark	
Mamuju	check	check	check	check	
Manado	check	check	check	check	
Manokwari	check	check	check	check	
Mataram	check	check	check	X mark	
Medan	check	check	check	check	
Merauke	check	check	check	X mark	
Melauboh	check	check	check	X mark	
Nabire	check	check	check	check	
Nganjuk	check		check	check	
Nias Selatan	check	X mark	check	X mark	
Nunukan	check	check	check	X mark	
Padang	check	check	check	check	
Palangkaraya	check	check	check	check	
Palembang	check	check	check	check	
Palu	check	check	check	check	
Pekanbaru	check	check	check	check	
Pontianak	check	check	check	check	
Purwokerto	check	check	check	X mark	
Ranai	check	check	check	X mark	
Rote	check	X mark	check	X mark	
Sabang	check	X mark	check	X mark	
Samarinda	check	check	check	check	
Sampang	check	X mark	check	X mark	
Saumlaki	check	X mark	check	X mark	
Semarang	check	check	check	check	
Sendawar	check	X mark	check	X mark	
Serui	check	check	check	X mark	
Sibolga	check	check	check	X mark	
Singaraja	check	check	check	X mark	
Sintang	check	check	check	X mark	
Sorong	check	check	check	X mark	
Sumenep	check	check	check	X mark	
Sungailiat	check	check	check	check	
Sungaipenuh	check	X mark	check	X mark	
Surabaya	check	check	check	check	
Surakarta	check	check	check	check	
Tahuna	check	check	check	check	
Takengon	check	X mark	check	X mark	
Tanjungpinang	check	check	check	check	
Tarakan	check	check	check	X mark	
Ternate	check	check	check	check	
Toli Toli	check	check	check	X mark	
Tual	check	check	check	X mark	
Wamena	check	check	check	X mark	
Way Kanan	check	X mark	check	X mark	
Yogyakarta	check	check	check	check	

An RRI local station for Dili was operating from 1976 to 1999. East Timor national broadcaster RTTL currently takes place.

=== Television ===
RRI NET logo since 11 September 2023

Aside of radio, RRI also operates a number of "television stations" with the concept of visual radio. Examples are RRI NET, a television channel broadcasts on satellite and online, and, formerly, a visual radio version of the Voice of Indonesia broadcasts online. It is similar to what was done by ABS-CBN Corporation's DZMM TeleRadyo in the Philippines.

RRI NET broadcasts certain live national radio programming via television. RRI NET can be accessed via streaming service as well as free-to-air satellite television across the country. Its slogan is "Tonton yang Anda Dengar" (Watch what you listen).

RRI NET is known to have been first broadcasting since December 2015. However, the channel was only officially launched on 12 September 2018 in commemoration of RRI's 73rd anniversary.

=== Online ===
RRI's website logo, used since 11 September 2023–January 2026

RRI Digital text-only logo, used since 2023

RRI maintain a news portal on its official website (rri.co.id), and was also operated indie music portal BeYoung.id. The network also maintain RRI Digital (formerly RRI Play and RRI PlayGo) mobile app, offering RRI services in one app such as live streaming of all networks and local stations, news portal, and many more. Previously, the mobile app offering RRI 30" citizen journalism and BeYoung.

== Criticism and controversies ==
=== Land conflict over the Cimanggis RRI transmitter complex ===
This conflict began when there was a handover report (BAST) of state property in the form of land from RRI to the Indonesian Ministry of Religious Affairs Number 774/DU/05/2017 dated 9 May 2017, in where RRI handed over a plot of land in Cimanggis, Depok, West Java covering an area of 1,425,889 square metres (more than 142 hectares) to the ministry for the establishment of International Islamic University of Indonesia (UIII). In accordance with article 6 of BAST, to ensure the continuity of RRI's broadcast operations, the ministry must move or construct buildings, structures and other equipment and infrastructure in stages in new places.

However, in practice, when the transfer or development had not yet been carried out, the process of building UIII in Cimanggis had already begun; which resulted in damage to the RRI short wave transmitter "fider line" which has been ongoing since the end of last year. On 20 December 2018, the President Director of RRI 2016–2021, Muhammad Rohanudin, sent a letter to the Religion Minister, Lukman Hakim Saifuddin regarding this matter which was not in accordance with the promises and commitments agreed in article 3 and article 6 of BAST.

RRI has occupied land in Cimanggis since 1958. From 2002 to 2012, RRI successively experienced civil lawsuits from outside parties regarding this land. However, court decisions have repeatedly ruled in favor of RRI. Until decision Number 99/Pdt/2012/PT.Bandung was accepted by LPP RRI, the plaintiff did not submit any other legal remedies.

=== 2021 President director's accusation of bias ===
In early 2021, President Director of RRI 2016-2021 Muhammad Rohanudin registered to become the supervisory board of RRI 2021-2026 and was declared to have passed the initial selection. Rohanudin was accused by some parties on behalf of RRI employees of having a "bad track record" during his tenure, including allegations of nepotism, mismanagement and abuse of authority. This is in line with the statement of Irawan Ronodipoero, son of RRI founder Joesoef Ronodipoero, who said that there had been "disharmony" within RRI as a result of his leadership.

This accusation was strengthened by the results of Sapta Pratala's research in the same month which found that the news portal rri.co.id provided a very large portion of news with the subject of DPR members for the Prosperous Justice Party (PKS) faction compared to other factions. Apart from that, Sapta Pratala's research assesses that rri.co.id is biased by reporting more comments rejecting the dissolution of Islamic Defenders Front (FPI) after the government disbanded the organization on 30 December 2020. Sapta Pratala has only described in the news media as a "public broadcast media observer", but there is no further information about its identity.

On 13 May, Deputy Secretary General of the Indonesian Solidarity Party (PSI) Satia Chandra Wiguna asked First Commission of the People's Representative Council to fire Rohanudin because he was deemed "contrary to RRI's ideal position as neutral news agency" and "defending intolerant people", even though according to Act Number 32 of 2002 the DPR does not have the right to dismiss the RRI Board of Directors. However, the RRI Supervisory Board previously dismissed Rohanudin on 8 May.

The accusations that emerged and the steps taken by the supervisory board were criticized by Esa Unggul University political communications expert Jamiluddin Ritonga. According to him, these accusations should not immediately be used as a basis for judging RRI, because of its status as public media. RRI, according to Ritonga, must "protect all elements of society" and "should not be like during the New Order era, which was clearly a mouthpiece for the government".

On 20 May 2021, First Commission of the DPR appointed Rohanudin as one of the members of the 2021-2026 RRI Supervisory Board from the RRI elements.

== Logo history ==
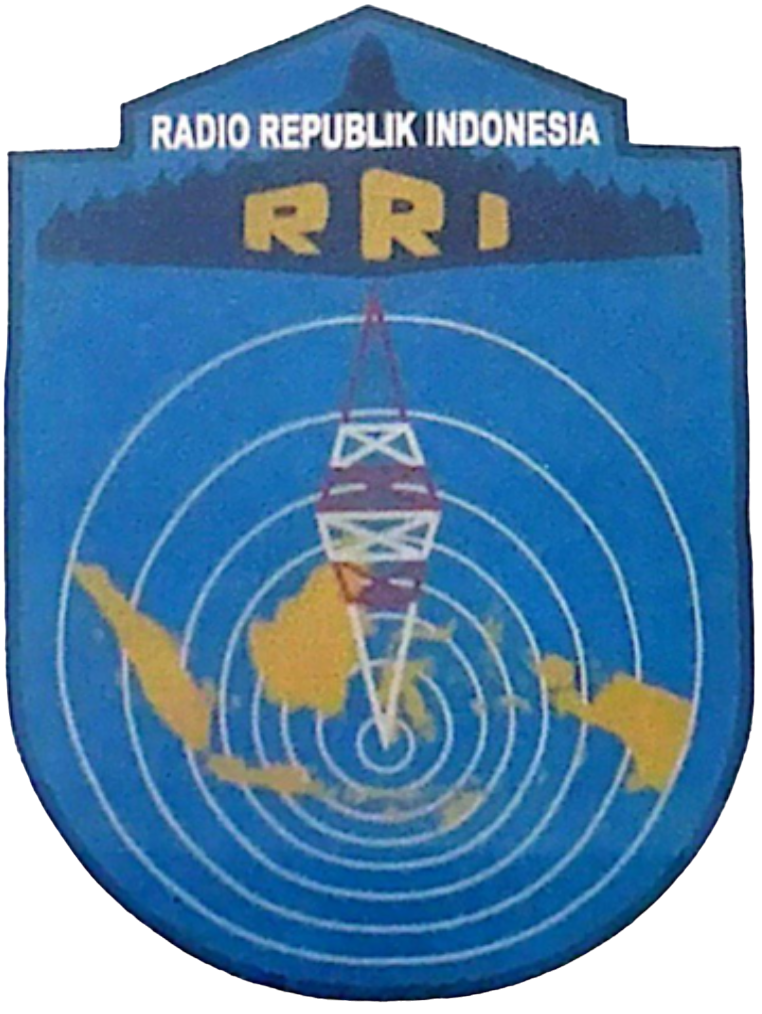
RRI's first logo (unknown–1998)

RRI's second logo (1998–2006)

RRI's third logo (2006–2023)

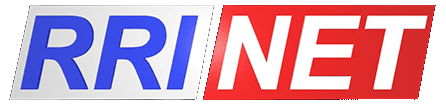
RRI NET former logo (2018–2023)

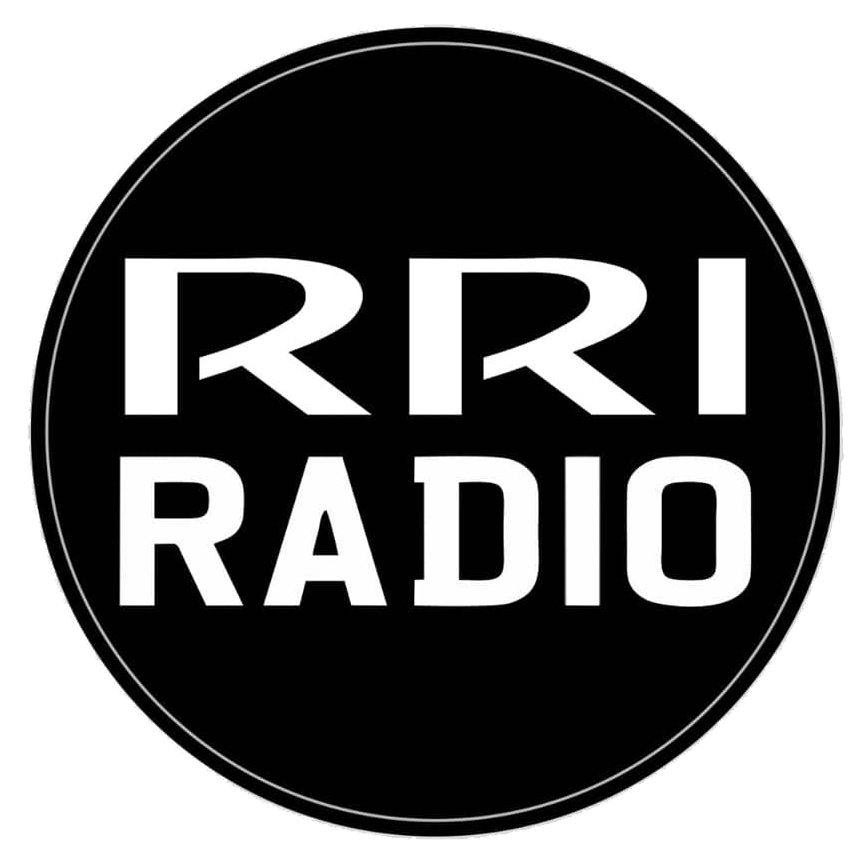
RRI's former secondary logo (2018–2023)

=== Fourth (current) logo variations (2023–present) ===
RRI's fourth logo without wordmark

RRI's fourth logo in vertical Indonesian language version

RRI's fourth logo with the slogan "Sekali di Udara, Tetap di Udara!"

Logo of RRI's 80th anniversary (2025)

Regional logos

RRI Jakarta logo

RRI Bandung logo

RRI Semarang logo

RRI Surabaya logo

RRI Yogyakarta logo

RRI Makassar logo

RRI Medan logo

RRI Banjarmasin logo

RRI Jayapura logo

RRI IKN logo

Service logos

RRI Pro 1 logo

RRI Pro 2 logo

RRI Pro 3 logo

RRI Pro 4 logo

RRI Pro 5 logo

RRI EWS (Early Warning System) logo

RRI Digital logo

== Slogans ==
- Sekali Di Udara Tetap Di Udara
- Terus Mengudara Untuk Indonesia

=== Pro 1 ===
- Pusat Pemberdayaan Masyarakat (1990-2007)
- News & Entertainment (2007-2011)
- Kanal Inspirasi (2011-2023)
- Kanal Informasi & Inspirasi (2023-present)

=== Pro 2 ===
- The Unique Station (1992-2007)
- Saluran Musik & Informasi (2007-2011)
- Suara Kreativitas (2011-2023)
- Teman Terbaik Kamu (2023-present)

=== Pro 3 ===
- Suara Pemberitaan Indonesia (1990-2005)
- Jaringan Berita Nasional (2005-2016, 2020-present)
- Suara Identitas Keindonesiaan (2016-2020)

=== Pro 4 ===
- Saluran Pendidikan & Budaya (2005-2011)
- Etalase Budaya Nusantara (2011-2016)
- Ensiklopedi Budaya Keindonesiaan (2016-2023)
- Suara Kebudayaan Indonesia (2023-present)

== See also ==
- Voice of Indonesia, the RRI shortwave overseas service
- TVRI, the Indonesian public television network
- Antara, the Indonesian news agency
- Public broadcasting in Indonesia
