= Cinere =

- Town and District
- Location in the city of Depok, Java and Indonesia Cinere (Java) Cinere (Indonesia)
- Coordinates: 6°20′S 106°47′E
- Country: Indonesia
- Region: Java
- Province: West Java
- City: Depok

Area
  - Total: 10.53 km^{2} (4.07 sq mi)
- Elevation: 38 m (125 ft)

Population (mid 2023 estimate)
  - Total: 101,600
  - Density: 9,649/km^{2} (24,990/sq mi)
- Time zone: UTC+7 (IWST)
- Area code: (+62) 21
- Vehicle registration: B
- Villages: 4
- Website: cinere.depok.go.id

Cinere is a town and an administrative district (kecamatan) of the city of Depok, in West Java Province of Indonesia. It covers an area of 10.53 km^{2} and had a population of 107,461 at the 2010 Census and 101,700 at the 2020 Census; the official estimate (as at mid 2023) was 101,600. Cinere District borders to its east on the Jagakarsa District and to its north on the Cilandak District, both being part of South Jakarta City; to the west it borders on the Ciputat Timur District and the Pamulang District of South Tangerang City within Banten Province; and to the south it borders on the Limo District of Depok City. Cinere has a large multi-racial population as a result of long-term transmigration from elsewhere in West Java and from Banten, which began in the late 1960s.

== Communities ==
Cinere District is sub-divided into four urban communities (kelurahan) listed below with their areas and their officially-estimated populations as at mid 2022, together with their postcodes.

Kode Wilayah	Name of kelurahan	Area in km^{2}	Population mid 2022 estimate	Post code
32.76.09.1001	Cinere (town)	3.717	32,226	16514
32.76.09.1002	Gandul	2.644	24,810	16512
32.76.09.1003	Pangkalan Jati	2,639	17,259	16513
32.76.09.1004	Pangkalanjati Baru	1.533	10,200	16513
32.76.09	Totals	10.533	84,495 ^{(a)}	

Notes: (a) comprising 42,033 males and 42,462 females.

== History ==
In the early colonial period in the Cinere region (Ci Kanyere) there was a stretch of land belonging to Isaac de l'Ostal de Saint-Martin (born in Oloron, Béarn, France in 1629) who worked for the VOC. In the era of independence, the area was inhabited by Betawi people and there were rubber forests, rice fields and swamps.

Cinere was a village of Bogor Regency until 1999. It was included with Depok city in 1999. In 2007, Cinere District was split off from Limo District to form the eleventh district of Depok city.

== Facilities ==
Cinere has many places of worship, hospitals, and malls. In addition, there are several housing areas and golf courses such as Pangkalan Jati and Sawangan.

This area is growing rapidly because of the construction of Cinere-Serpong Toll Road and Cinere-Jagorawi Toll Road, which are part of the Jakarta Outer Ring Road 2 or JORR 2. Cinere is served by Pondok Cabe Airport, although the airport does not handle commercial flights. Pondok Cabe is situated to the west of Cinere, in Pamulang District of the city of South Tangerang in Banten province, approximately 15 kilometres south of Jakarta (South).
