= Limo, Depok =

- Town and District
- Location in the city of Depok, Java and Indonesia Limo, Depok (Java) Limo, Depok (Indonesia)
- Coordinates: 6°21′56″S 106°46′49″E
- Country: Indonesia
- Region: Java
- Province: West Java
- City: Depok
- Established: 11 January 1992

Area
  - Total: 11.89 km^{2} (4.59 sq mi)
- Elevation: 64 m (210 ft)

Population (mid 2023 estimate)
  - Total: 124,020
  - Density: 10,430/km^{2} (27,020/sq mi)
- Time zone: UTC+7 (IWST)
- Area code: (+62) 21
- Vehicle registration: B
- Villages: 4
- Website: limo.depok.go.id

Limo is a town and an administrative district (kecamatan) within the city of Depok, in the province of West Java, Indonesia. It covers an area of 11.89 km^{2} and had a population of 87,953 at the 2010 Census and 115,700 at the 2020 Census; the latest official estimate (as at mid 2023) is 124,020.

== History ==
Limo was previously part of Sawangan district before it was split off from the eastern part of the district in 1992.

== Communities ==
Limo District is sub-divided into four urban communities (kelurahan) listed below with their areas and their officially-estimated populations as at mid 2022, together with their postcodes.

Kode Wilayah	Name of kelurahan	Area in km^{2}	Population mid 2022 estimate	Post code
32.76.04.1001	Maruyung	2.77	20,269	16515
32.76.04.1002	Grogol	2.88	27,907	16512
32.76.04.1003	Krukut	2.02	16,118	16512
32.76.04.1004	Limo (town)	4.23	32,363	16515
32.76.04	Totals	11.89	96,657 ^{(a)}	

Notes: (a) comprising 48,581 males and 48,076 females.
