= Sukmajaya =

- Town and District
- Location in the city of Depok, Java and Indonesia Sukmajaya (Java) Sukmajaya (Indonesia)
- Coordinates: 6.385337°S 106.847338°E
- Country: Indonesia
- Province: West Java
- City: Depok

Area
  - Total: 17.37 km^{2} (6.71 sq mi)
- Elevation: 140 m (460 ft)

Population (mid 2023 estimate)
  - Total: 256,060
- Time zone: UTC+7 (IWST)
- Area code: (+62) 21
- Villages: 6
- Website: sukmajaya.depok.go.id

Sukmajaya is a town and an administrative district (kecamatan) within the city of Depok, in the province of West Java, Indonesia, within the Jakarta metropolitan area. It covers an area of 17.37 km^{2} and had a population of 232,308 at the 2010 Census and 252,500 at the 2020 Census; the official estimate as at mid 2023 is 256,060. It is one of the most densely populated areas in Depok. Many housing areas and educational institutions are located in this district. Moreover, Depok Dua Tengah and Depok Dua Timur are also located within the district. In addition, Pesona Square shopping mall is located in this district.

== History ==
Sukmajaya was the easternmost district of Depok Administrative City, in which it was established on 18 March 1982, before the inclusion of Cimanggis District in 1999. The district was first inaugurated by the then Minister of Home Affairs, Lt. Gen. Amirmachmud. This was related to the inauguration of Depok as an Administrative City covering Beji District, Sukmajaya District, Pancoran Mas District, Sawangan District and Limo District.

Sukmajaya District Office is located at Jalan Merdeka Raya 1 Depok Dua Tengah. Sukmajaya District was established on the basis of Depok City Local Regulation No. 08 of 2007 on District Expansion, which states that the Sukmajaya District is a part of the Depok City area.

== Neighbouring districts ==
Sukmajaya District is surrounded north by Cimanggis District, south by Cilodong District, west by Pancoran Mas District, and east by Tapos District.

== Communities ==
Sukmajaya District is sub-divided into six urban communities (kelurahan) listed below with their areas and their officially-estimated populations as at mid 2022, together with their postcodes.

Kode Wilayah	Name of kelurahan	Area in km^{2}	Population mid 2022 estimate	Post code
32.76.05.1001	Sukmajaya (town)	3.33	33,530	16412
32.76.05.1003	Abadijaya	2.67	60,113	16417
32.76.05.1004	Mekarjaya	3.26	57,945	16411
32.76.05.1005	Baktijaya	2.53	57,492	16418
32.76.05.1008	Cisalak	2.68	17,183	16416
32.76.05.1010	Tirtajaya	2.88	20,209	16412
32.76.05	Totals	17.35	248,472 ^{(a)}	

Notes: (a) comprising 123,099 males and 125,373 females.

== See also ==
- List Postcodes in Depok (Articles in Indonesian)
