= Cipayung, Depok =

- Town and District
- Location in the city of Depok, Java and Indonesia Cipayung, Depok (Java) Cipayung, Depok (Indonesia)
- Coordinates: 6°25′45″S 106°48′10″E
- Country: Indonesia
- Region: Java
- Province: West Java
- City: Depok

Area
  - Total: 11.375 km^{2} (4.392 sq mi)
- Elevation: 64 m (210 ft)

Population (mid 2023 estimate)
  - Total: 184,930
  - Density: 16,258/km^{2} (42,107/sq mi)
- Time zone: UTC+7 (IWST)
- Area code: (+62) 21
- Vehicle registration: B
- Villages: 5
- Website: cipayung.depok.go.id

Cipayung is a town and an administrative district (kecamatan) within the city of Depok, in the province of West Java, Indonesia (not to be confused with the district of the same name in the city of East Jakarta). It covers an area of 11.375 km^{2} and had a population of 127,917 at the 2010 Census and 171,600 at the 2020 Census; the latest official estimate (as at mid 2023) is 184,930.

== Communities ==
Cipayung District is sub-divided into five urban communities (kelurahan) listed below with their areas and their officially-estimated populations as at mid 2022, together with their postcodes.

Kode Wilayah	Name of kelurahan	Area in km^{2}	Population mid 2022 estimate	Post code
32.76.07.1001	Cipayung (town)	2.14	30,820	16437
32.76.07.1002	Cipaying Jaya	2.35	20,418	16437
32.76.07.1003	Ratu Jaya	3.05	41,264	16439
32.76.07.1004	Bojong Pondok Terong	2.20	36,698	16436
32.76.07.1005	Pondok Jaya	1.71	27,712	16438
32.76.07	Totals	11.45	156,912 ^{(a)}	

Notes: (a) comprising 79,071 males and 77,841 females.
