= Bojongsari =

Bojongsari may refer to:

- Bojongsari, Depok, a town in West Java, Indonesia
- Bojongsari, Purbalingga, a district in Central Java, Indonesia
