= Gong Si Bolong =

Indonesian music group

Gong Si Bolong is an art form from Indonesia which was developed by the people of Depok City. Nowadays, this art are showing this existence on a musical group in Depok City.
