= Jagorawi Toll Road =

Toll road in Indonesia

Coordinates: 06°15′11″S 106°52′22″E

Jakarta–Bogor–Ciawi Toll Road
- Jalan Tol Jakarta–Bogor–Ciawi
- Jagorawi Toll Road
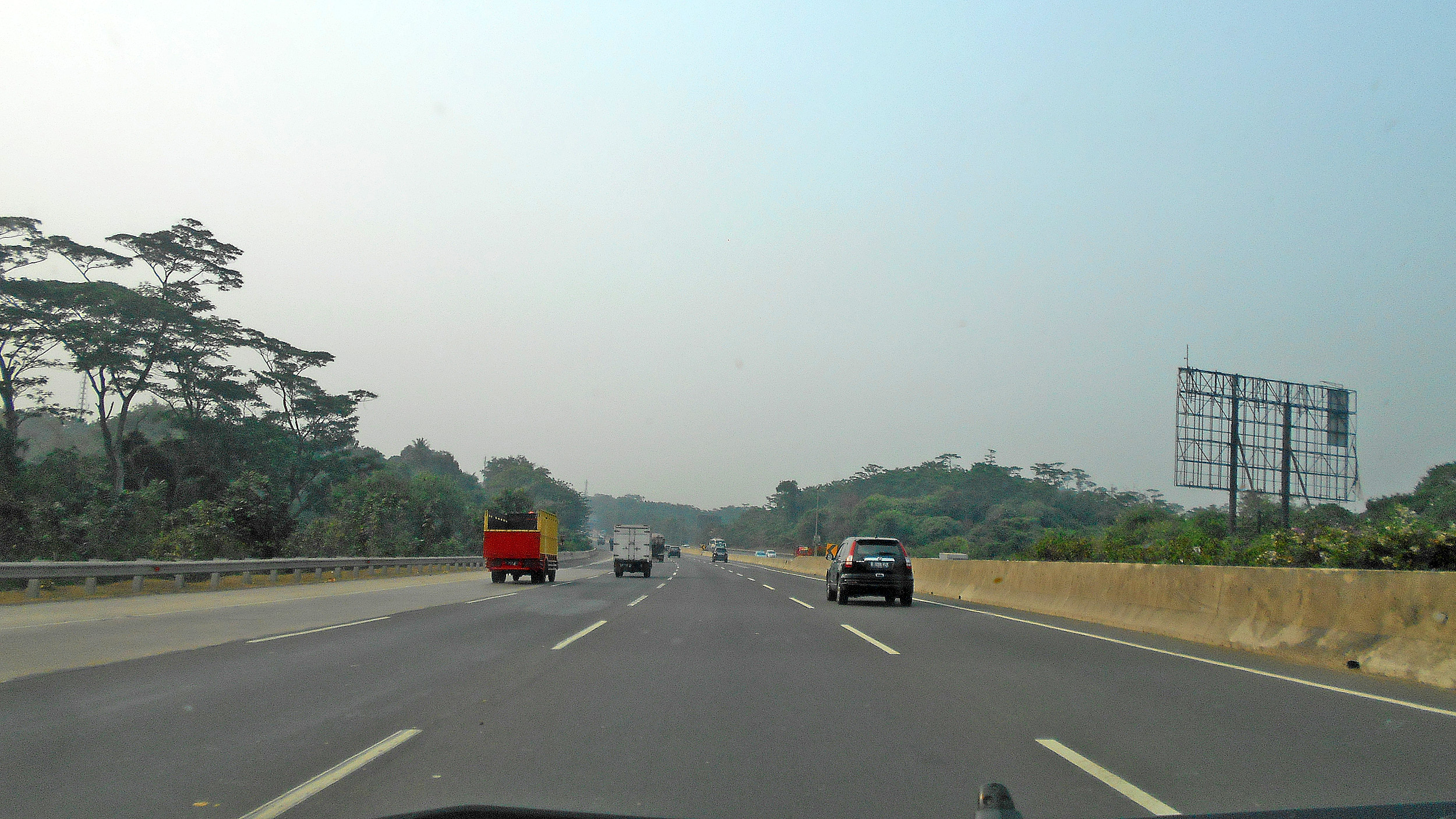
- Southbound Jagorawi Toll Road heading to Citeureup, Bogor Regency in 2019

Route information
- Maintained by Jasa Marga
- Length: 59 km (37 mi)
- Existed: 9 March 1978–present
- History: Built in 1973-1978

Major junctions
- North end: Cawang
- Jakarta Inner Ring Road; Jakarta Outer Ring Road; Cinere–Jagorawi Toll Road/Cimanggis–Cibitung Toll Road (partially opened) (Jakarta Outer Ring Road 2); Bogor Ring Road; Bogor-Ciawi-Sukabumi Toll Road (partially opened)
- South end: Ciawi

Location
- Country: Indonesia
- Provinces: DKI Jakarta; West Java
- Major cities: East Jakarta; Depok; Bogor Regency; Bogor City

Highway system
- Transport in Indonesia

The Jakarta–Bogor–Ciawi Toll Road (Indonesian: Jalan Tol Jakarta-Bogor-Ciawi) or shortened to Jagorawi Toll Road/Jalan Tol Jagorawi is the first controlled-access toll road in Indonesia. Construction of the highway began in 1973, and it was officially opened on 9 March 1978.

The Jagorawi Toll Road links the capital city of Jakarta to the West Javanese cities of Bogor and Ciawi. It has a length of around 59 kilometres (37 mi) going north and southbound and is operated by Jasa Marga, a state-owned enterprise.

The toll road has achieved break-even point, making it the cheapest toll road in Indonesia based on price per kilometer.

== History ==
In 1973, the Indonesian government began developing the first highway linking the capital Jakarta with the city of Bogor. When the road was still in its construction phase, it was not officially a toll road. When the highway was nearly finished, the government began considering ways to execute the operation and maintenance of the highway autonomously, without burdening governmental financing. For that purpose, the Labor Department suggested that the portion of the road between Jakarta and Bogor be changed to a toll road.

The construction of the Jagorawi Toll Road began in 1975, with funding supported by a loan from the United States Agency for International Development (USAID). The infrastructure enterprise gained momentum following a plan by American investor Kaiser Cement to establish a 1.2 million-ton annual output facility in Cibinong, prompting company delegate Nick P. Petroff to advocate for US financial assistance on behalf of the Indonesian state. Capital allocation for the project was divided on a 70–30 basis, where the US covered $22.8 million while Indonesia injected $10.3 million, both channeling these resources as equity into PT Jasa Marga (Persero) Tbk.

Execution of the physical works was entrusted to South Korean contractor Hyundai Construction Co., overseen by American supervisory consultants Ammann-Whitney & Trans Asia Engineering Associates Inc. While engaging international firms generated debate regarding the participation of domestic professionals, President Suharto emphasized that many Indonesian workers were directly involved in the build.

Private investors, with government financing, established the semi-private corporation Jasa Marga to manage the highway on 1 March 1978. The road was officially inaugurated in a ceremony on 9 March 1978 by President Suharto. The remaining Cibinong–Bogor and Bogor–Ciawi segments opened in 1979.

In 2017, PT Jasa Marga issued securities backed by the toll revenues from Jagorawi.

== Exits ==
Province	Location	km	mi	Exit	Name	Destinations	Notes
Special Capital Region of Jakarta	Kramat Jati, East Jakarta	0	0.0	Jakarta Inner Ring Road			
Special Capital Region of Jakarta	Kramat Jati, East Jakarta	2.4	1.5		Cililitan Toll Gate	Jakarta Inner Ring Road	Jakarta Inner Ring Road-bound only
Special Capital Region of Jakarta	Kramat Jati, East Jakarta	3	1.9	3	Cawang Ramp	Cawang; Halim Perdanakusuma Airport; Jakarta–Cikampek Toll Road	Northern terminus; North-bound exit & South-bound entry only
Special Capital Region of Jakarta	Makasar, East Jakarta	4.2	2.6	4	Ramp Taman Mini Toll Gate	Taman Mini Indonesia Indah; Cipayung; Kramat Jati; Pondok Gede	
Special Capital Region of Jakarta	Makasar, East Jakarta	6.0	3.7	6	Dukuh/Pasar Rebo Interchange	Jakarta Outer Ring Road; Eastbound; Bambu Apus; Cilangkap; Jakarta–Cikampek Toll Road; Westbound; Cijantung; Pasar Minggu; Jakarta–Serpong Toll Road	
Special Capital Region of Jakarta	Cipayung, East Jakarta	13.0	8.1	13	Cibubur Toll Gate	Cibubur; Cikeas; Cileungsi; Jonggol	
West Java	Cimanggis, Depok	15.6	9.7	16	Cimanggis Interchange	Jakarta Outer Ring Road 2; Eastbound; Cimanggis–Cibitung Toll Road; Jatikarya; Westbound; Cinere–Jagorawi Toll Road; Cisalak; Kukusan	
West Java	Tapos, Depok	19.2	11.9	19	Cimanggis Toll Gate	Cimanggis; Cikeas; Tapos	South-bound exit, south-bound entry, & north-bound entry only.
West Java	Gunung Putri, Bogor Regency	23.8	14.8	24	Gunung Putri Toll Gate; Karanggan Toll Gate	Gunung Putri; Cikeas; Karangggan	
West Java	Citeureup, Bogor Regency	26.4	16.4	27	Citeureup Toll Gate	Citeureup; Cibinong	
West Java	Babakan Madang, Bogor Regency	32.1	19.9	32	Sentul Toll Gate	Sentul International Circuit; Nanggewer	
West Java	Babakan Madang, Bogor Regency	36.1	22.4	37	Sentul Selatan Toll Gate	Sentul City; Bogor Ring Road	
West Java	North Bogor, Bogor	40.0	24.9	40	Bogor Toll Gate	Bogor; Bogor Botanical Garden; Baranangsiang Terminal	
West Java	East Bogor, Bogor	41.2	25.6		Ciawi 2 Toll Gate	South Sentul; Citeureup; Jakarta	North-bound only
West Java	Sukaraja, Bogor Regency	42.2	26.2	42	Bogor Selatan Toll Gate	South Bogor; Sukaraja; Cibanon; Gunung Geulis; Summarecon Bogor	South-bound exit & North-bound entry only
West Java	Sukaraja, Bogor Regency	44.3	27.5		Ciawi Toll Gate	Puncak; Ciawi	South-bound only
West Java	Ciawi, Bogor Regency	46.4	28.8	46	Puncak Ramp	Puncak; Cisarua; Taman Safari; Bandung	South-bound exit & North-bound entry only
West Java	Ciawi, Bogor Regency	47.0	29.2	47	Ciawi Ramp	Ciawi; Tajur; Puncak	
West Java	East Bogor, Bogor	47.2	29.3	Bogor–Ciawi–Sukabumi Toll Road			
1.000 mi = 1.609 km; 1.000 km = 0.621 mi: Electronic toll collection; Incomplete access; Route transition

== Facilities ==
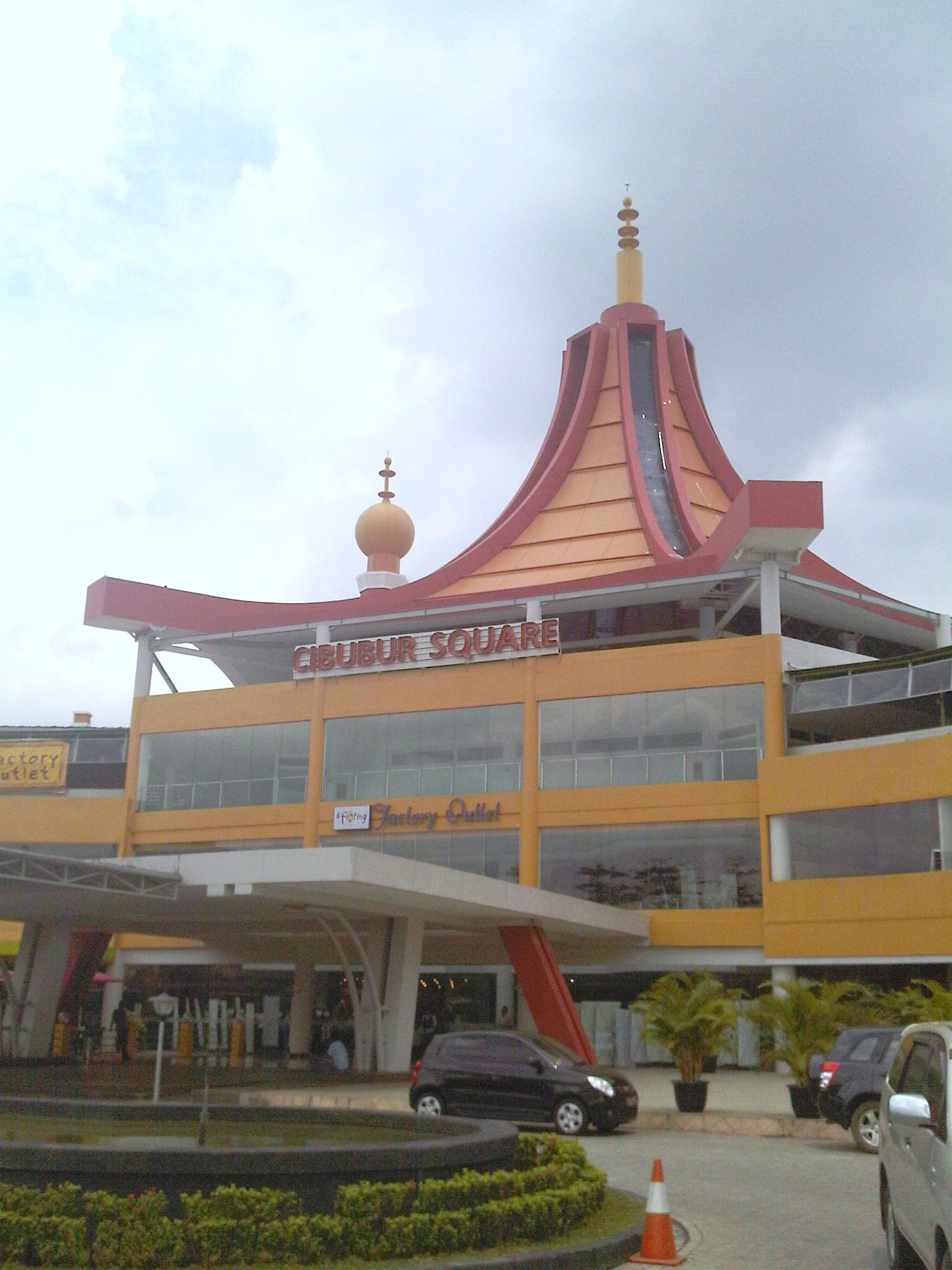
Rest Area at Km 10, heading to Bogor.

The Jagorawi Toll Road is four lanes wide (in each direction) from Taman Mini to Citeureup, and three lanes wide from Citeureup to Bogor.

The toll road has a Pertamina gas station which is combined with restaurants, rest areas, and outlet stores.

== Notable accidents ==
On 8 September 2013, the toll road has been a nationwide media attention following a fatal accident involving Ahmad Dhani and Maia Estianty's youngest son Abdul Qodir Jaelani. Seven people were killed and 8 people were severely injured in the crash. It was revealed that Abdul lost control of his car and hit the metal separator while traveling home from Bogor to Jakarta, crashing into two oncoming vehicles on the opposite lane.

== Floods ==
For the first time in January 2014, Jagorawi Toll Road was flooded from Cipinang River at KM 4. The toll road was still operational in both directions, with vehicles driving slowly through the flood. Consequently, the toll road suffered from severe gridlock.

== Ciawi–Sukabumi Toll Road ==
Ciawi–Sukabumi Toll Road is a planned 54-km extension of Jagorawi Toll Road, subdivided into 4 sections:

- Ciawi–Cigombong, 15 km (9.3 mi)
- Cigombong–Cibadak, 12 km (7.5 mi)
- Cibadak–West Sukabumi, 14 km (8.7 mi)
- Cisaat–East Sukabumi, 13 km (8.1 mi)

Concession is held by PT Trans Jabar Toll, a subsidiary of state-owned developer Waskita Karya. Land acquisition by January 2013 was at 40 percent, and Trans Jabar predicted that the construction would begin by the end of 2013. However, construction was delayed due to problems with land acquisition. President Joko Widodo renewed the government's efforts to complete land acquisition in 2016. The Ciawi–Cigombong section was opened in December 2018. Construction on the second section, Cigombong–Cibadak, was 76.50% complete by February 2021; the projected completion date is August 2021.
