= Cilodong =

- Town and District
- Location in the city of Depok, Java and Indonesia Cilodong (Java) Cilodong (Indonesia)
- Coordinates: 6°25′50″S 106°50′20″E
- Country: Indonesia
- Region: Java
- Province: West Java
- City: Depok

Area
  - Total: 15.38 km^{2} (5.94 sq mi)
- Elevation: 64 m (210 ft)

Population (mid 2023 estimate)
  - Total: 181,410
  - Density: 11,800/km^{2} (30,550/sq mi)
- Time zone: UTC+7 (IWST)
- Area code: (+62) 21
- Vehicle registration: B
- Villages: 5
- Website: cilodong.depok.go.id

Cilodong is a town and an administrative district (kecamatan) within the city of Depok, in the province of West Java, Indonesia. It covers an area of 15.38 km^{2} and had a population of 125,014 at the 2010 Census and 168,200 at the 2020 Census; the latest official estimate (as at mid 2023) is 181,410.

== Communities ==
Cilodong District is sub-divided into five urban communities (kelurahan) listed below with their areas and their officially-estimated populations as at mid 2022, together with their postcodes.

Kode Wilayah	Name of kelurahan	Area in km^{2}	Population mid 2022 estimate	Post code
32.76.08.1001	Sukamaju	4.36	68,569	16415
32.76.08.1002	Cilodong (town)	2.19	21,284	16414
32.76.08.1003	Kalibaru	3.25	31,317	16414
32.76.08.1004	Kalimulya	3.07	21,887	16413
32.76.08.1005	Jatimulya	2.52	16,044	16413
32.76.08	Totals	15.38	159,101 ^{(a)}	

Notes: (a) comprising 80,177 males and 78,924 females.
