= Dian Al-Mahri Mosque =

Mosque in Depok, Banten, Indonesia

- Masjid Dian Al-Mahri
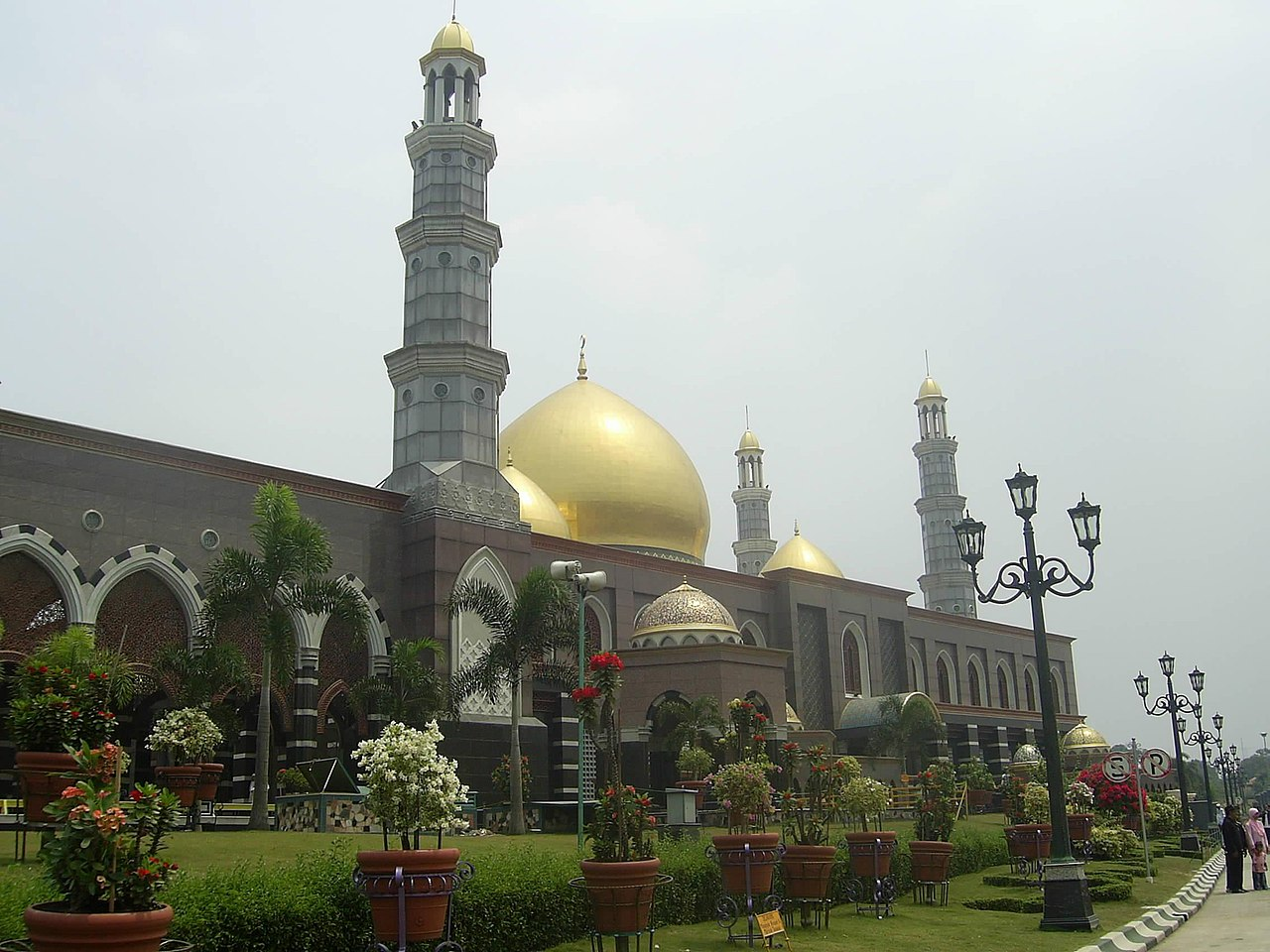

- Location in Depok, Java, and Indonesia Dian Al-Mahri Mosque (Java) Dian Al-Mahri Mosque (Indonesia)

Religion
- Affiliation: Islam
- Branch/tradition: Sunni

Location
- Location: Depok, West Java, Indonesia
- Coordinates: 6.384098°S 106.772003°E

Architecture
- Type: Mosque
- Style: Arabic, Persian, Indian
- Completed: 2006

Specifications
- Capacity: 20,000 pilgrims
- Dome: 5
- Dome dia. (outer): 20 m
- Minaret: 6
- Minaret height: 40 m

Dian Al-Mahri Mosque, also known as Golden Dome Mosque (Masjid Kubah Emas), is a mosque built on the edge of Raya street, Depok City in West Java, Indonesia. In addition to being a place of daily worship for Muslims, this mosque area attracts many locals and tourists because its domes are made of gold. Because of the vastness of the area and its accessibility to the public, this place is often a holiday destination for family or a place to take a rest.

== History ==
The mosque was built by Hj. Dian Djuriah Maimun Al Rashid, a businesswoman from Banten, who has bought its land in 1996. The construction had begun in 2001 and finished around the end of 2006. The mosque was inaugurated to the public on December 31, 2006, coinciding with the second Eid al-Adha of the year. With an area of 50 hectares, the building occupies an area of 60 x 120 meters or about 8000 square meters. The mosque itself can accommodate around 20,000 worshipers. The area of the mosque with the size of 50,000 m^{2} is often referred as one of the largest in Southeast Asia.

== Architecture ==
The mosque has three domes, one main dome and two small domes. The entire dome is coated with gold as thick as two to three millimeters and decorated with crystal mosaics, making it the most unique feature of the mosque. Shape of the main dome resembles the dome of Taj Mahal in India. The dome has a bottom diameter of 16 meters, a diameter of 20 meters, and a height of 25 meters. While other smaller domes have a diameter of under 6 meters, middle 7 meters, and height 8 meters.

As for the interior, there are chandeliers imported directly from Italy weighing 8 tons inside the mosque. In addition, the ornate relief above the imam's residence is made of 18 carat gold. The fence on the second floor as well as the ceiling of the mosque have decorative calligraphy. As for material of the crown pillars of the mosque, it amounts to 168 pieces of layered gold residue. The prayer hall is painted in monochrome color scheme with the main element of cream, in order to give its mood a quiet and warm feeling. The material is made of marble imported from Turkey and Italy.
In general, its architectural style follows the design from the Middle East with features like domes, minarets, Obelisk, and the use of decorative detail or decoration with geometric patterns, in order to reinforce the Islamic character of its architecture. Another feature is the entrance gateway portal and geometric decoration and obelisk as its ornament.
The inner courtyard measures 45 x 57 meters and is able to accommodate 8,000 worshipers. Six minarets are hexagonal, symbolizing the pillars of faith, towering as high as 40 meters. The six towers were clad in a gray granite stone imported from Italy with a circular ornament. At its peak is a 24 carat gold-plated mosaic dome. Shape of the domes on the minaret resembles Persian and Indian style. Five domes represent the Islamic pillars, all of which are wrapped in 24 karat gold-plated mosaics whose material is imported from Italy.

== See also ==
- List of largest mosques
- List of mosques in Indonesia
