= Jakarta State Polytechnic =

State Polytechnic of Jakarta
- Politeknik Negeri Jakarta
- Motto: To be an excellent polytechnic at international level to support the competitiveness of the nation
- Type: State Polytechnic
- Established: September 22, 1982
- Affiliations: Paguyuban Politeknik Seluruh Indonesia
- Director: Dr. sc. Zainal Nur Arifin, Dipl-Ing. HTL, M.T.(2020-present)
- Location: Depok, West Java, Indonesia; 6.371551°S 106.824218°E
- Campus: 25.000m^{2}
Colors
Yellow
- Nickname: PNJ
- Website: www.pnj.ac.id
- Location in Depok

Jakarta State Polytechnic (in Indonesian: Politeknik Negeri Jakarta), abbreviated as PNJ. It is located in the north part of Depok, West Java.

== History ==
The history of Politeknik Negeri Jakarta (PNJ) originates from the Non-Degree Faculty of Technology of Universitas Indonesia (FNGT UI), which later became Politeknik Universitas Indonesia. Politeknik Universitas Indonesia was designated as one of the six higher education institutions selected for the Polytechnic Education Development Project Phase I by the Directorate General of Higher Education (Dikti). It was officially established on September 20, 1982. On August 25, 1998, Politeknik Universitas Indonesia was renamed Politeknik Negeri Jakarta, granting it autonomous status to manage its own statutes as per the Decree of the Minister of Education and Culture Number 207/O/1998. Despite the change, the academic community of PNJ maintains a harmonious relationship with Universitas Indonesia.

Initially, three departments were established: Mechanical Engineering, Civil Engineering, and Electrical Engineering. In 1986, the Commerce Department was added, which later evolved into the Accounting Department and the Business Administration Department. In 1990, the Department of Graphic Engineering and Publishing was established as a result of a collaboration between Politeknik Universitas Indonesia and the Indonesian Graphics Center. Later, in 2014, the separation of several study programs from the Department of Electrical Engineering led to the establishment of the Department of Informatics and Computer Engineering.

== Academics ==
Jakarta State Polytechnic has departments and study programs as follows:

=== Diploma III ===
- Mechanical Engineering
- Civil Engineering
- Electronic Engineering
- Accounting
- Business Administration
- Graphic Arts and Publishing Techniques

=== Diploma IV ===
- Mechanical Engineering
- Civil Engineering
- Business Administration
- Information Technology
