= Tapos =

- Town and District
- Location in the city of Depok, Java and Indonesia Tapos (Java) Tapos (Indonesia)
- Coordinates: 6°25′10″S 106°52′40″E
- Country: Indonesia
- Region: Java
- Province: West Java
- City: Depok

Area
  - Total: 33.43 km^{2} (12.91 sq mi)
- Elevation: 64 m (210 ft)

Population (mid 2023 estimate)
  - Total: 276,010
  - Density: 8,256/km^{2} (21,380/sq mi)
- Time zone: UTC+7 (IWST)
- Area code: (+62) 21
- Vehicle registration: B
- Villages: 7
- Website: tapos.depok.go.id

Tapos is a town and an administrative district (kecamatan) within the city of Depok, in the province of West Java, Indonesia. It covers an area of 33.43 km^{2} and had a population of 216,215 at the 2010 Census and 263,400 at the 2020 Census; the latest official estimate (as of mid 2023) is 276,010.

== Administrative division ==
Tapos district is sub-divided into seven urban communities (kelurahan) listed below with their areas and their officially-estimated populations as at mid 2022, together with their postcodes.

Kode Wilayah	Name of kelurahan	Area in km^{2}	Population mid 2022 estimate	Post code
32.76.10.1001	Tapos (town)	6.31	16,923	16457
32.76.10.1002	Leuwinanggung	4.31	13,454	16456
32.76.10.1003	Sukatani	4.81	56,223	16454
32.76.10.1004	Sukamaju Baru	4.26	44,895	16455
32.76.10.1005	Jatijajar	2.66	38,703	16451
32.76.10.1006	Cilangkap	6.16	55,313	16458
32.76.10.1007	Cimpaeun	4.93	26,231	16459
32.76.10	Totals	33.43	251,742 ^{(a)}	

Notes: (a) comprising 126,493 males and 125,249 females.
