= Bojongsari, Depok =

- Town and District
- Location in the city of Depok, Java and Indonesia Bojongsari, Depok (Java) Bojongsari, Depok (Indonesia)
- Coordinates: 6°23′50″S 106°44′20″E
- Country: Indonesia
- Region: Java
- Province: West Java
- City: Depok

Area
  - Total: 19.41 km^{2} (7.49 sq mi)
- Elevation: 64 m (210 ft)

Population (mid 2023 estimate)
  - Total: 146,810
  - Density: 7,564/km^{2} (19,590/sq mi)
- Time zone: UTC+7 (IWST)
- Area code: (+62) 21
- Vehicle registration: B
- Villages: 7
- Website: bojongsari.depok.go.id

Bojongsari is a town and an administrative district (kecamatan) within the city of Depok, in the province of West Java, Indonesia (not to be confused with the district of the same name in Purbalingga Regency). It covers an area of 19.41 km^{2} and had a population of 99,735 at the 2010 Census and 135,700 at the 2020 Census; the latest official estimate (as at mid 2023) is 146,810.

== Communities ==
Bojongsari District is sub-divided into seven urban communities (kelurahan) listed below with their areas and their officially-estimated populations as at mid 2022, together with their postcodes.

Kode Wilayah	Name of kelurahan	Area in km^{2}	Population mid 2022 estimate	Post code
32.76.11.1001	Bojongsari Lama	2.06	16,572	16516
32.76.11.1002	Bojongsari Baru	1.97	11,647	16516
32.76.11.1003	Serua	3.28	19,832	16517
32.76.11.1004	Pondok Petir	3.09	23,439	16517
32.76.11.1005	Curug	4.23	23,606	16517
32.76.11.1006	Duren Mekar	1.91	17,932	16518
32.76.11.1007	Duren Seribu	2.87	12,319	16518
32.76.11	Totals	19.41	125,347 ^{(a)}	

Notes: (a) comprising 63,284 males and 62,063 females.
