= Sawangan =

Town and District in West Java, Indonesia

- Town and District
- Location in the city of Depok, Java and Indonesia Sawangan (Java) Sawangan (Indonesia)
- Coordinates: 6.408574°S 106.764747°E
- Country: Indonesia
- Region: Java
- Province: West Java
- City: Depok

Area
  - Total: 26.07 km^{2} (10.07 sq mi)
- Elevation: 60 m (200 ft)

Population (mid 2023)
  - Total: 197,170
  - Density: 7,563/km^{2} (19,590/sq mi)
- Time zone: UTC+7 (IWST)
- Postcodes: 16511 - 16519
- Area code: (+62) 21
- Vehicle registration: B
- Villages: 7
- Website: sawangan.depok.go.id

Sawangan is a town and an administrative district in the city of Depok, in West Java province of Indonesia (not to be confused with the district of the same name in Magelang Regency or the village in Sulawesi). It covers an area of 26.07 km^{2} and had a population of 123,571 at the 2010 census and 178,900 at the 2020 Census; the latest official estimate (as at mid 2023) is 197,170.

== Communities ==
Sawangan is sub-divided into seven urban communities (kelurahan) listed below with their areas and their officially-estimated populations as at mid 2022, together with their postcodes.

Kode Wilayah	Name of kelurahan	Area in km^{2}	Population mid 2022 estimate	Post code
32.76.03.1001	Pasir Putih	4.63	29,010	16519
32.76.03.1002	Bedahan	5.85	33,083	16519
32.76.03.1003	Pengasinan	4.05	27,663	16518
32.76.03.1009	Cinangka	3.44	20,610	16516
32.76.03.1010	Sawangan (town)	3.28	20,142	16511
32.76.03.1011	Sawangan Baru	2.77	18,510	16511
32.76.03.1012	Kedaung	2.05	16,561	16516
32.76.03	Totals	26.07	165,579 ^{(a)}	

Notes: (a) comprising 83,654 males and 81,925 females.
