= Depok =

City in West Java, Indonesia

- City
- City of Depok; Kota Depok

Other transcription(s)
  - Betawi: Dèpok Kota'
  - Sundanese: ᮓᮚᮩᮂ ᮓᮨᮕᮧᮊ᮪
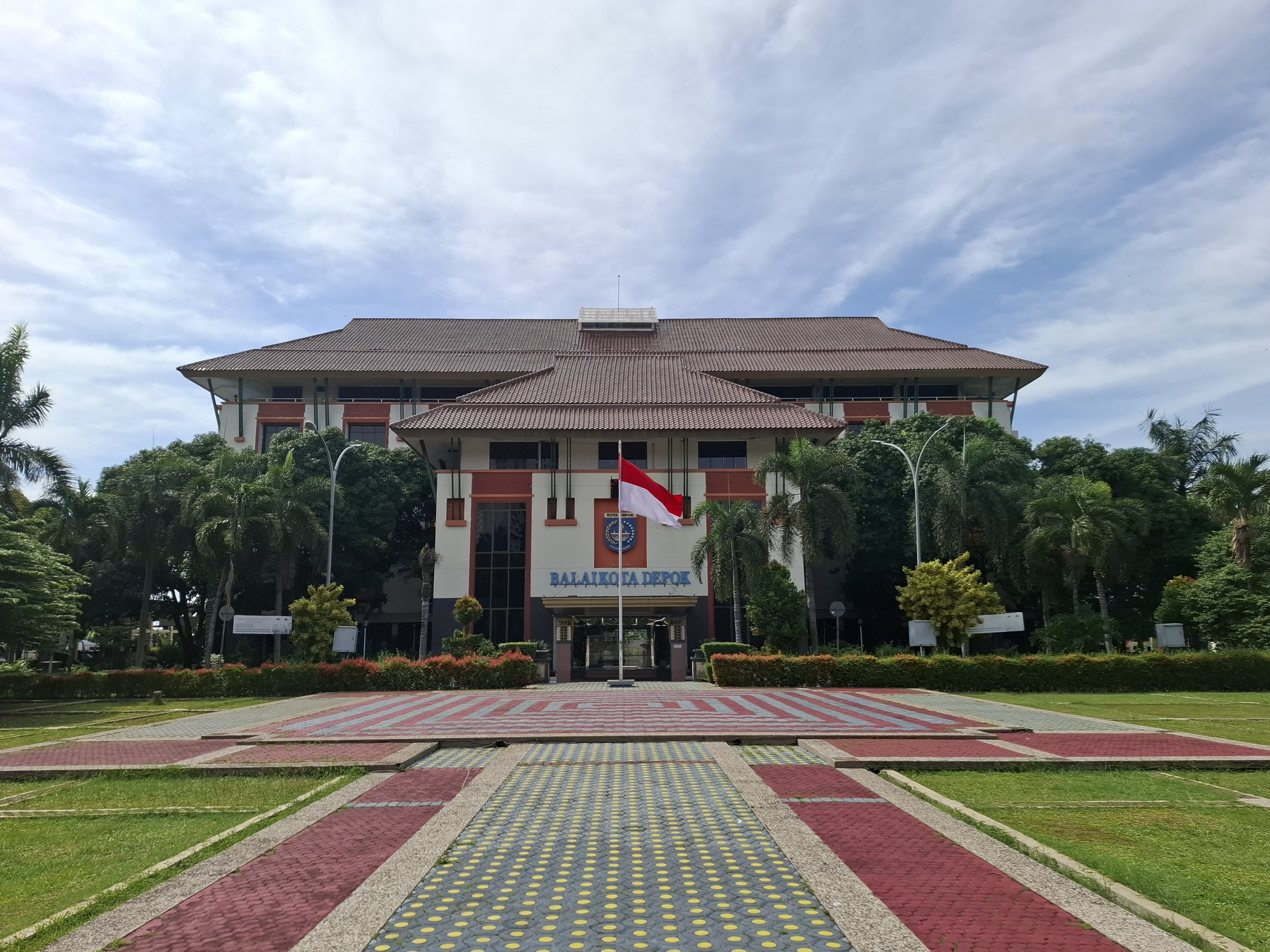
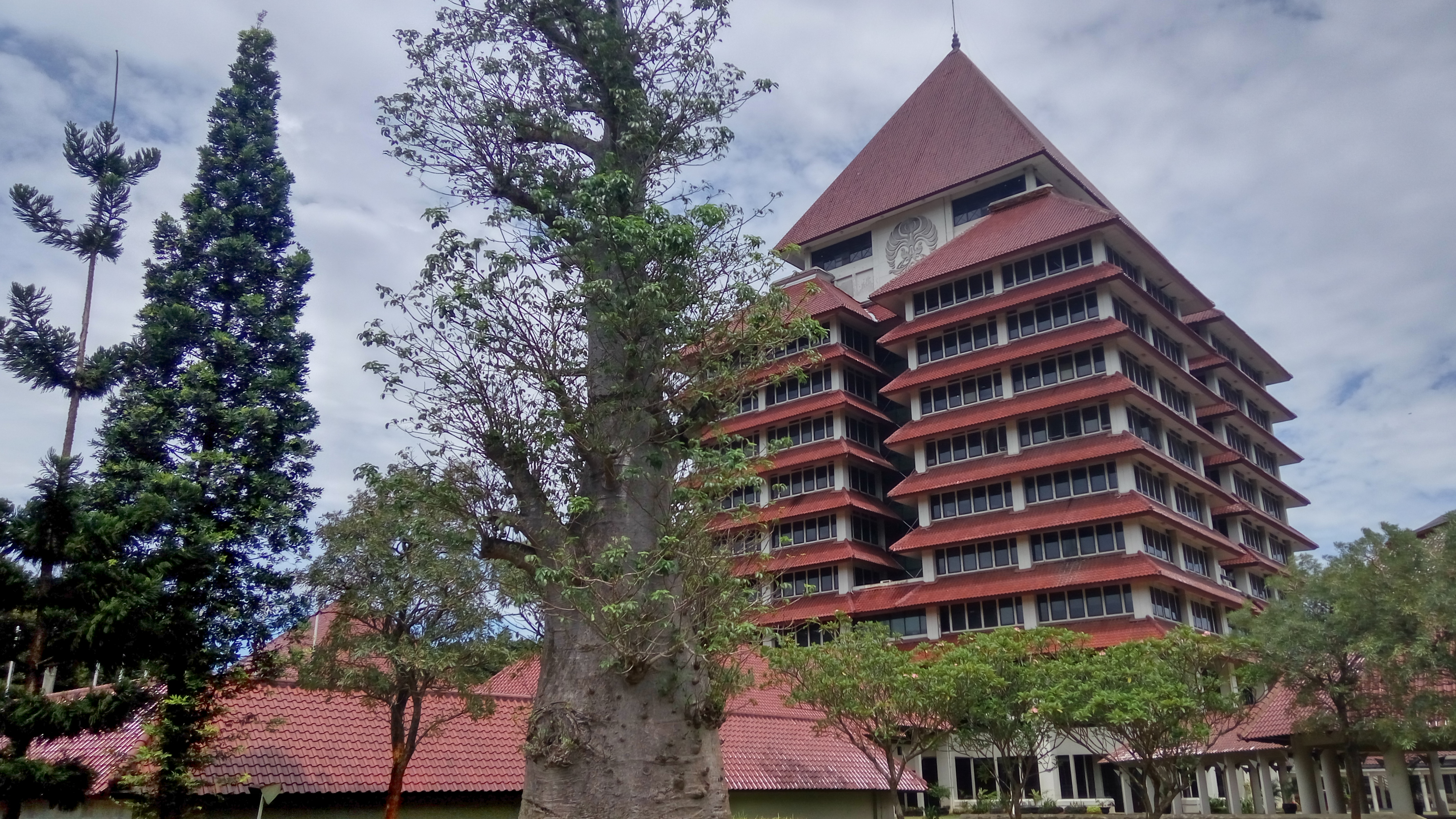
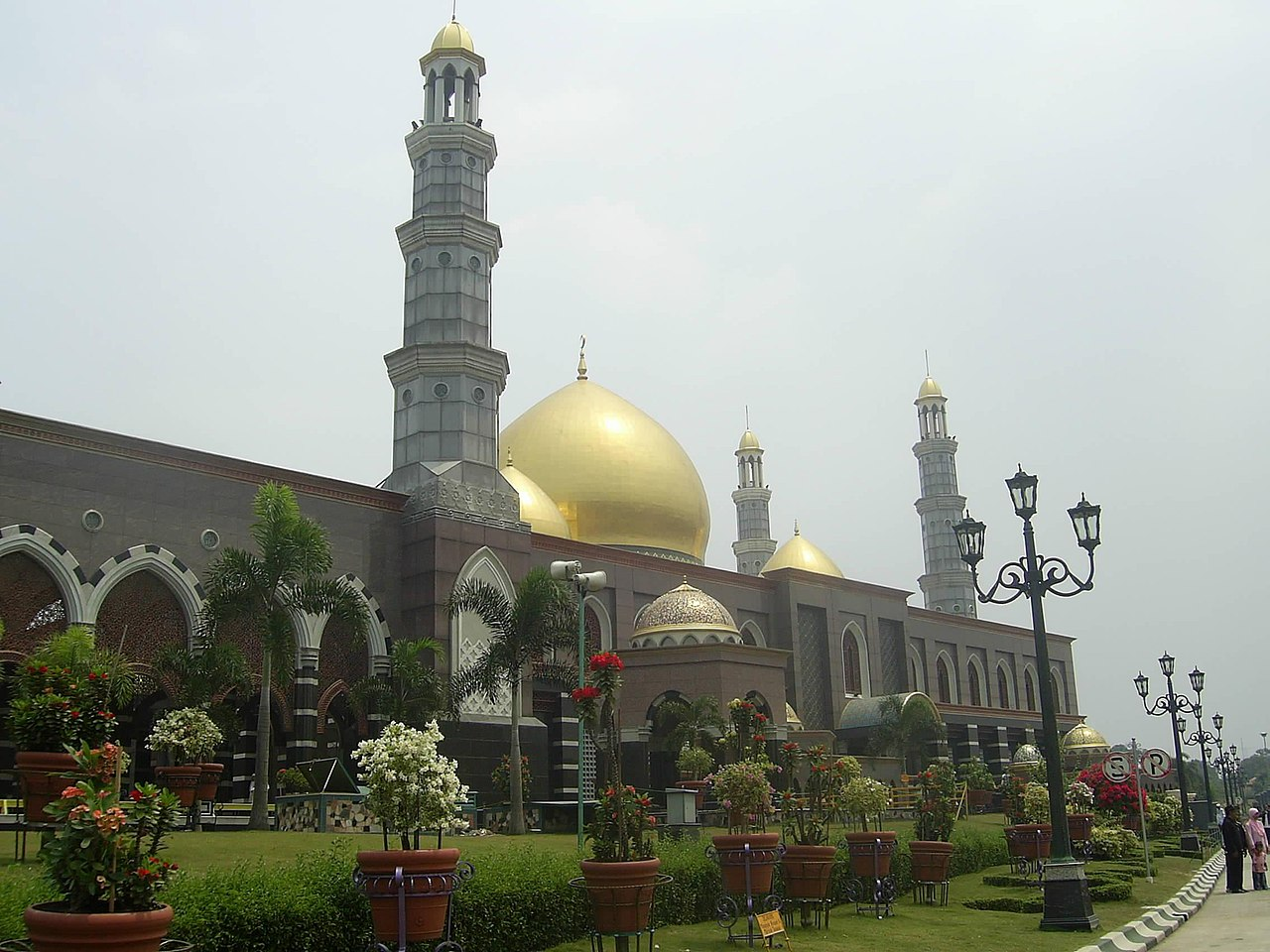
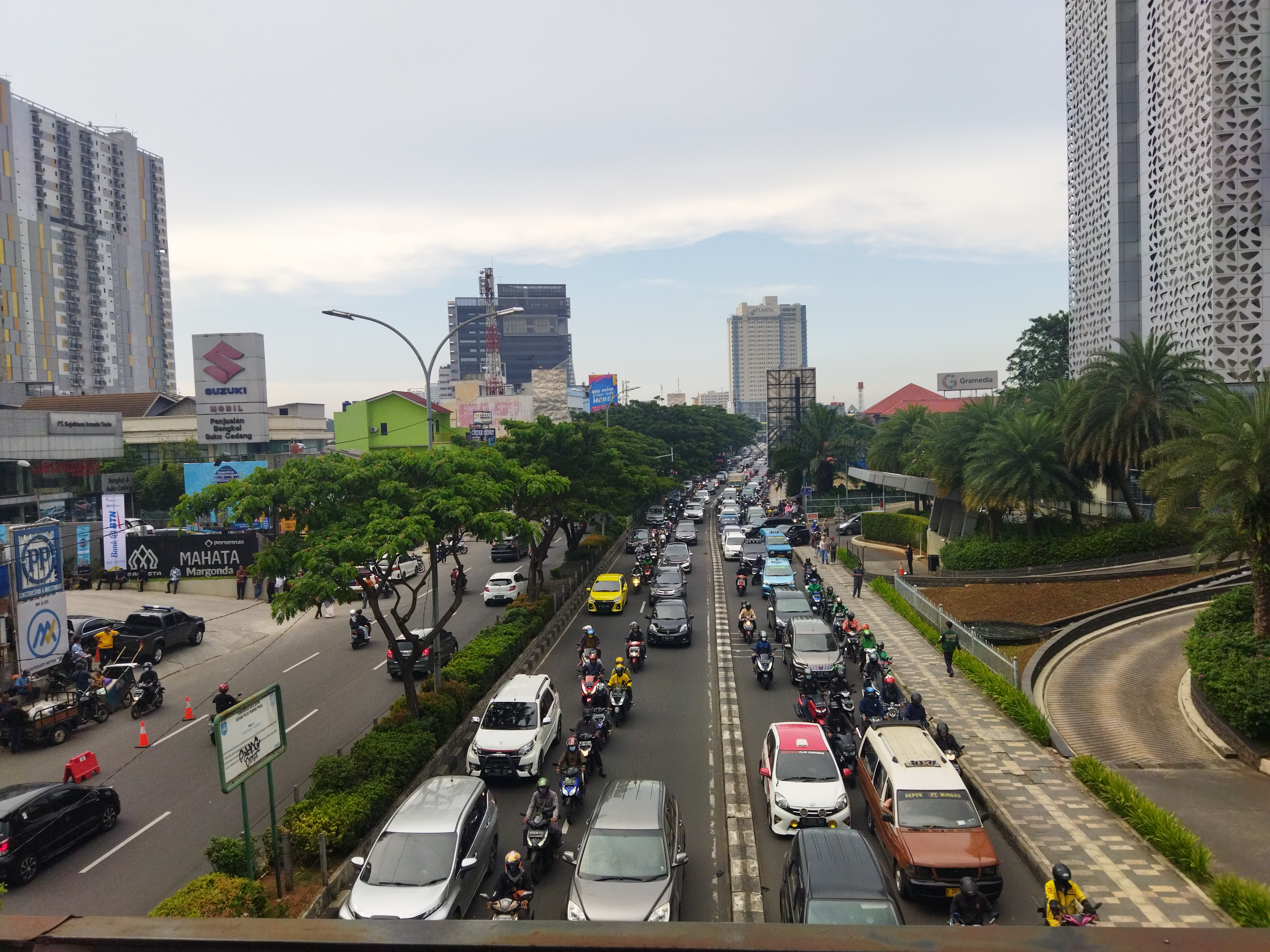
- Depok City Hall University of Indonesia Dian Al-Mahri Mosque Margonda Street

- Flag Coat of arms
- Nickname: Kota Belimbing (Starfruit City)
- Motto: Paricara Darma (Sanskrit) (Servant of the righteousness)
- Location within West Java

- Location in Java and Indonesia Depok City (Indonesia)
- Coordinates: 6°23′38″S 106°49′21″E
- Country: Indonesia
- Province: West Java
- Metropolitan area: Jabodetabek
- Settled: 18 May 1696
- Incorporated (as kotamadya): 20 April 1999

Government
  - Mayor: Supian Suri (Gerindra)
  - Vice Mayor: Chandra Rahmansyah

Area
  - Total: 199.91 km^{2} (77.19 sq mi)
- Elevation: 93 m (305 ft)
- Highest elevation: 140 m (460 ft)
- Lowest elevation: 50 m (160 ft)

Population (mid 2025 estimate)
  - Total: 2,167,961
  - Rank: 6th
  - Density: 10,845/km^{2} (28,088/sq mi)
- Time zone: UTC+7 (Indonesia Western Time)
- Postcodes: 164xx, 165xx
- Area code: (+62) 21/251
- Vehicle registration: B xxxx Exx/Zxx
- HDI (2022): ▲0.819 (very high)
- Website: depok.go.id

Depok is a landlocked city in West Java province. It is located directly south of Jakarta, and it is the third largest urban center in the Greater Jakarta metropolitan area after Jakarta and Bekasi, covering an area of about 199.91 km^{2}. It is known as a center of education and commerce. The city had a population of 1,738,600 at the 2010 census and 2,056,400 at the 2020 census; the official estimate for mid 2025 was 2,167,961 (comprising 1,089,830 males and 1,078,131 females), resulting in a density of about 10,845 people per km^{2}. Depok became an independent city on 20 April 1999, having previously been part of Bogor Regency. It is the second most populous suburban city in Indonesia after Bekasi, and among the ten most populous suburban cities in the world.

== History ==
There are two possible origins of the name 'Depok'. The first suggests that the region was already known as Depok when the land was purchased by Cornelis Chastelein, a senior official in the Dutch East India Company, on 18 May 1696. The purchased land measured about 12.44 km^{2}, approximately 6.2% of the current area of Depok. Aside from establishing plantations with the help of the local inhabitants, Chastelein was also engaged in missionary work, introducing Christianity to the local population. He founded a local congregation named De Eerste Protestante Organisatie van Christenen (DEPOC), and in the 1950s, some members of the Depok community in the Netherlands claimed that this acronym influenced the modern name of the city. An alternative explanation is that the name derives from the Indonesian word padepokan (Hermitage), as the site had previously been used as a religious retreat.

Before his death on 28 June 1714, Chastelein wrote a will that freed the enslaved families of Depok and granted them pieces of his land, transforming them into landowners. Therefore, the 12 slave families became landowners (forever as given to them with entitlement deeds of Chastelein himself in his will) and freed men, women, and their children. The freed slaves are also referred to as the Mardijker's – and it originated from the word *Merdeka* or freedom in Bahasa Indonesia. Therefore, June 28 has been designated as Depokse Dag (Depok Day) by the descendants of the original Depok family, and on 28 June 2014, to commemorate the 300th anniversary of Chastelein's will, they erected a 3-meter-high monument on their land, but the city government at the time prohibited it, citing its association with Dutch colonial history.

The 12 original Depok family names are:

- Bacas
- Isakh
- Jacob
- Jonathans
- Joseph
- Laurens
- Leander
- Loen
- Sadokh
- Samuel
- Soedira
- Tholense

The original slave families of Depok are of Balinese, Ambonese, Buginese, Sundanese and Portuguese Indo, i.e., Mestizo and Mardijker descent. Isakh, Jacob, Jonathans, Joseph, and Samuel were family names baptized by Chastelein after the slave families converted to Protestant Christianity. The other families retained their original names and might have been (Roman Catholic) Christian already before joining Chastelein's Protestant church. Descendants of the original Depok families with the exception of the Sadokh family, still live in Indonesia, the Netherlands, Norway, Canada and the United States.

In 1871, the colonial government granted Depok a special status (Gemeente), allowing the area to establish its own local government headed by a council leader (President). This local governance ended in 1952, when the Depok administration transferred its authority to the Indonesian government, except for certain territories.

During the Bersiap (Indonesian civil war and war for independence from The Netherlands) period of 1945, Depok experienced violence, and some of its inhabitants were killed by the local youth groups (Pemuda). The instability caused by the Indonesian War of Independence led to several of the original Depok families to flee the town. Many of the surviving families later settled in the Netherlands and various other countries as part of the broader Indo community.

In March 1982, Depok was reclassified as an administrative city within Bogor Regency. On 20 April 1999, the city of Depok merged with some neighbouring districts of Bogor Regency to form an autonomous city, independent of the Regency, with an area of 199.91 km^{2}. This date is commemorated as Depok's official establishment date.

== Geology and climate ==
Depok has a tropical rainforest climate (Köppen: Af) and situated in the alluvial lowland, Depok experiences two seasons, namely wet and dry seasons. The former usually happens between May until September, while the latter usually happens between October until April.

Depok is situated on a geological basement dominated by alluvial deposits. Gravitational data from ESA-MWT studies indicate variations in subsurface rock density beneath the area, supporting the presence of these deposits. The finding has been corroborated by other geological surveys. The alluvial layers are located approximately 0–68 meters above a bedrock formation dating from the Pleistocene epoch.

Two major rivers flow through Depok: the Ciliwung River and the Pesanggrahan River. Depok also has 13 tributaries and 22 lakes spread across districts around the city.

== Administration ==
Administration of Depok City

Depok is headed by a mayor, with a legislative assembly. Both the mayor and the members of the legislative assembly are elected by direct vote.

=== Mayors ===
- Mochammad Rukasah Suradimadja (1982–1984)
- Mochammad Ibid Tamdjid (1984–1988)
- Abdul Wachyan (1988–1991)
- Mochammad Masduki (1991–1992)
- Sofyan Safari Hamim (1992–1996)
- Badrul Kamal (1997–2005)
- Nur Mahmudi Ismail (2006–2016)
- Mohammad Idris (2016–2025)
- Supian Suri (2025–present)

=== Administrative districts ===
The city of Depok is divided into eleven districts (kecamatan), tabulated below with their areas and their populations at the 2010 census and the 2020 census, together with the official estimates as of mid 2025. The table also includes the number of administrative villages (all classed as urban kelurahan) in each district and its postal codes.

Regional Codes	Name of District (kecamatan)	Area in km^{2}	Pop'n census 2010	Pop'n census 2020	Pop'n estimate mid 2025	No. of kelurahan	Post codes
32.76.03	Sawangan	26.07	123,571	178,900	206,515	7	16511 - 16519
32.76.11	Bojongsari	19.41	99,735	135,700	151,911	7	16516 - 16518
32.76.01	Pancoran Mas	18.05	210,514	245,000	254,370	6	16431 - 16436
32.76.07	Cipayung	11.37	127,917	171,600	190,849	5	16436 - 16439
32.76.05	Sukmajaya	17.37	232,308	252,500	253,712	6	16411 - 16418
32.76.08	Cilodong	15.38	125,014	168,200	187,319	5	16413 - 16415
32.76.02	Cimanggis	21.78	241,979	252,000	247,999	6	16451 - 16454
32.76.10	Tapos	33.43	216,215	263,400	279,577	7	16451 - 16459
32.76.06	Beji	14.63	165,903	171,700	168,484	6	16421 - 16426
32.76.04	Limo	11.89	87,953	115,700	127,509	4	16512 - 16515
32.76.09	Cinere	10.53	107,461	101,700	99,716	4	16512 - 16514
	Total city	199.91	1,738,570	2,056,400	2,167,961	63	

== Demographics ==
=== Ethnic groups ===
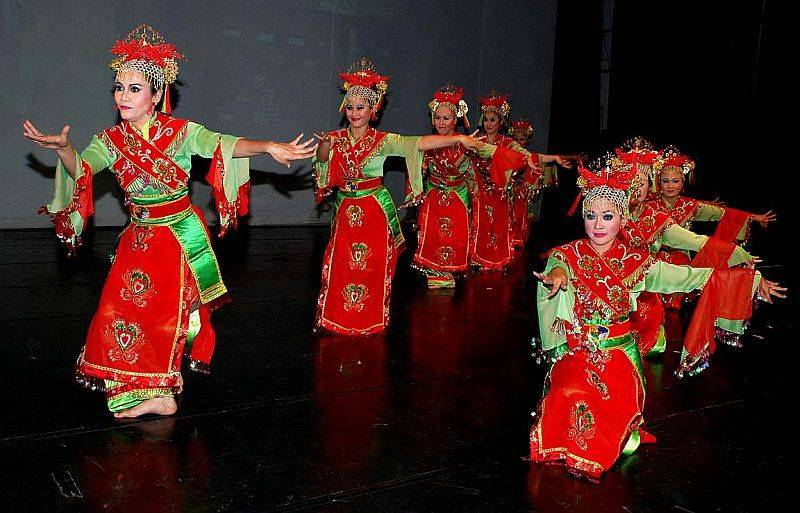
Lenggang Nyai dance of Betawi people.

The ethnic groups characteristics in the population of Depok are diverse. Based on data from the 2000 Indonesian census, the majority of the Depok population's are Betawi, Javanese, and Sundanese. Significant numbers also come from the Sumatran ethnic groups, namely Batak and Minangkabau. The Betawi people and a small number of Sundanese people (not including other ethnic Sundanese immigrants from Parahyangan and Banten) in the eastern part of the city are recognized as the indigenous people of Depok. The following is the population of Depok City based on ethnicity according to data from the 2000 Indonesian census;

=== Languages ===
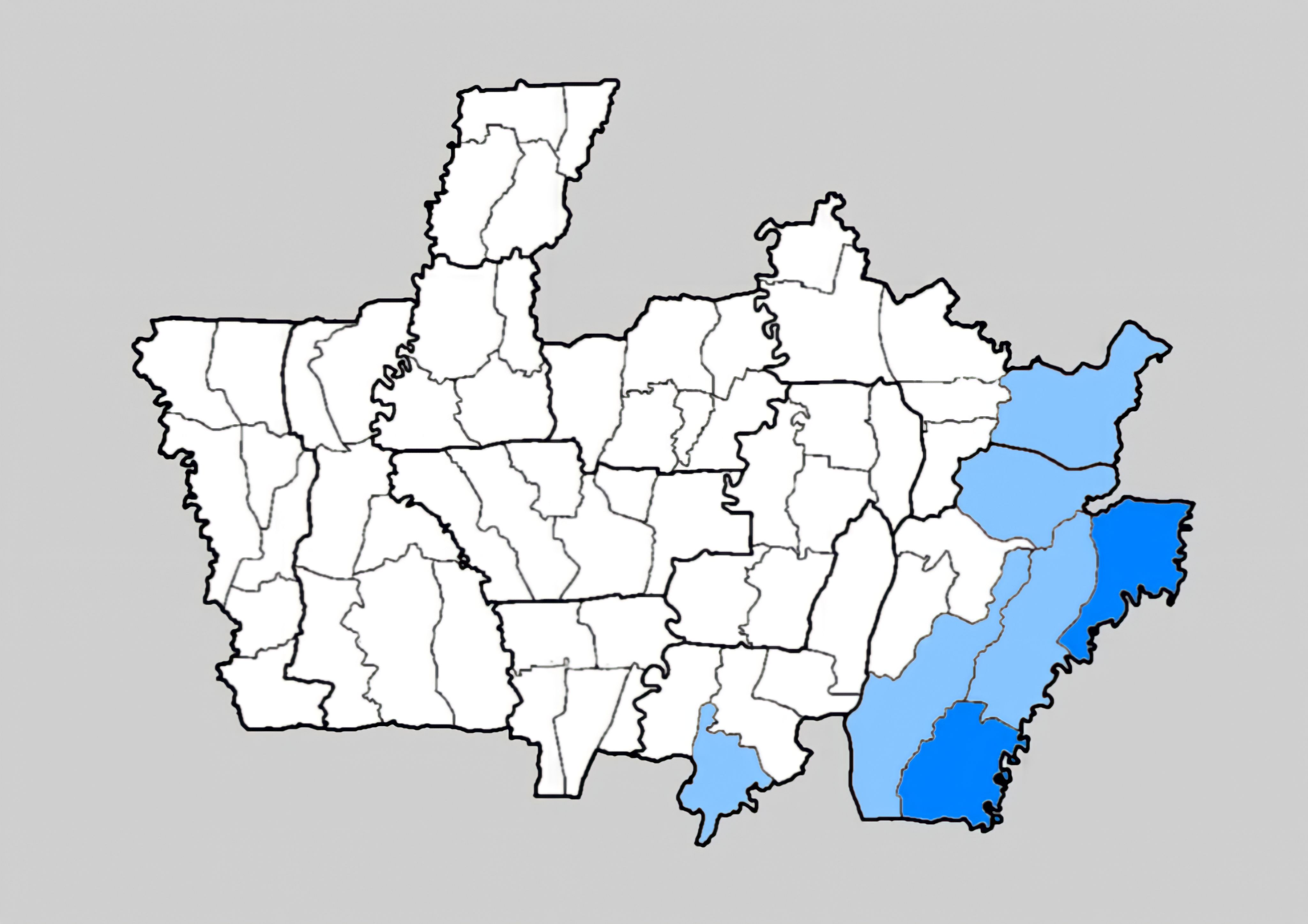
Map of the distribution of Sundanese language in Depok. Majority speakers Minority speakers

In Depok there are areas where the majority of the people speak Sundanese language, namely Leuwinanggung, Cimpaeun, and Cilangkap urban villages (kelurahan) in Tapos district. There are also several other districts whose people speak Sundanese language, as in Cimanggis and Cilodong. However, overall, Betawi language is the regional language most widely used in Depok, namely the Betawi Ora dialect or locally known as bahasa Depok (lit. 'language of Depok'). Then, because of the large number of immigrants from all over Indonesia, the lingua franca used is Indonesian language.

== Facilities ==
=== Commerce ===
Depok has a growing eclectic collection of malls and traditional markets. Older malls or other notable shopping centers include D'mall Depok, Ciplaz Depok, and SixtyOne Building, and ITC Depok. Depok has many local restaurants and has wide presence of international chains.

There are many shopping centers in Depok, such as:

- Depok Town Square — commonly referred to as DeTos
- Margo City
- Pesona Square
- Depok Town Center
- City Plaza Depok
- Cinere Mall
- Cinere Bellevue Mall
- Cimanggis Square
- Trans Studio Mall Cibubur
- The Park Sawangan shopping mall

Traditional markets include Pasar Depok Baru, Pasar Depok Lama (short: Pasar Lama), Pasar Kemiri (originally expanded to facilitate the move of Pasar Lama traders), Pasar PAL, Pasar Agung, Pasar Musi, Pasar Cisalak, and Pasar Majapahit.

=== Parks ===
Alun Alun Depok or Depok Square is equipped with various sports facilities such as a basketball court, futsal, skateboard, wall climbing, BMX arena, children's playground, fish pond, fountain, and others. Godongijo Conservation and Education Park is located in Depok. The park provides children and teachers alike the ability to get up close and personal with nature. There are also other children's amusement parks in the city such as Depok Fantasi Waterpark, Taman Pemuda Pratama, and Pondok Zidane.

== Education ==
Depok is a city of education because there are several well-known universities in Indonesia in this city, including:

- University of Indonesia
- Gunadarma University
- Jakarta State Polytechnic
- International Islamic University of Indonesia

Depok has several private language schools, namely EF English First, Kinderfield Highfield Depok, International Language Programs (ILP), Lembaga Indonesia Amerika (LIA), The British Institute (TBI), Lembaga Pendidikan Indonesia - Amerika (LPIA), and several other small institutions. The location is along Margonda Raya and Cinere Raya, between the main roads that pass through Depok. In the city of Depok there are also Islamic schools including for Madrasah Tsanawiyah (MTs) there are around 72 schools

== Sports ==
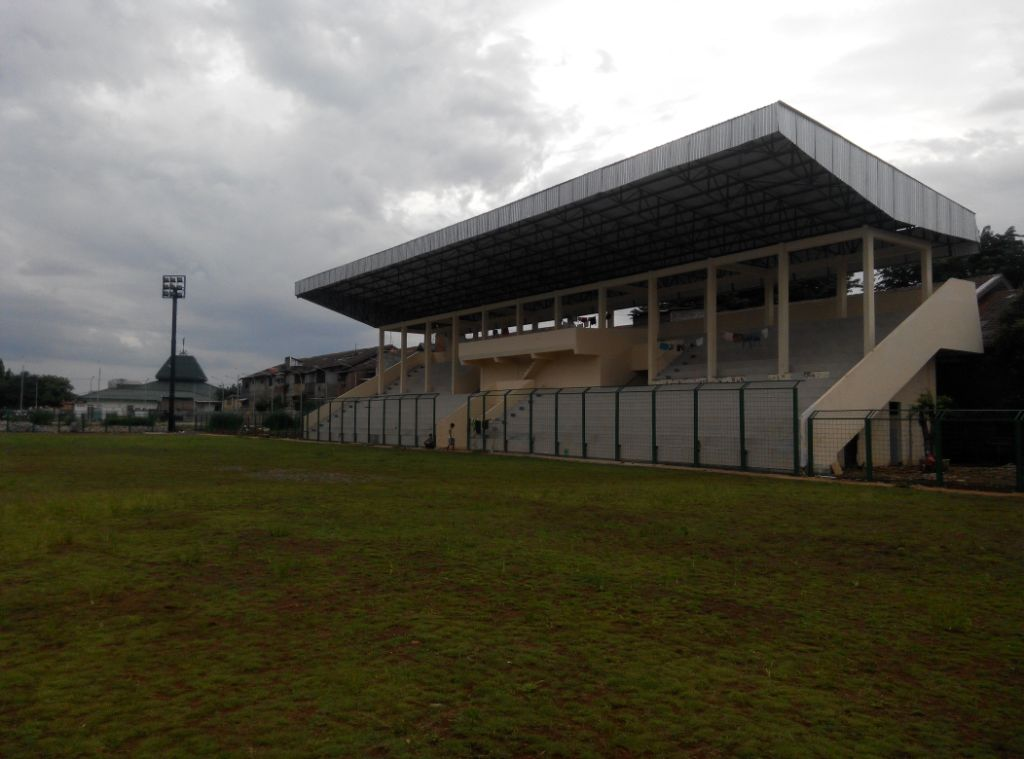
Mahakam Stadium, homebase of Persikad Depok

Depok is the home town of the Persikad Depok and Dejan FC football team who currently plays in the Liga 3.

== Transportation ==
=== Toll road access ===
KM	Toll road	Destination
13	Jagorawi Toll Road	Cibubur, Cikeas, Cileungsi, Jonggol
28	Jakarta Outer Ring Road	Pasar Minggu, Lenteng Agung
16	Cinere-Jagorawi Toll Road	Cisalak, Juanda, Margonda
13	Depok–Antasari Toll Road	Sawangan, Parung, Ciputat, Serpong, Billabong, Bogor

=== Public transportation ===
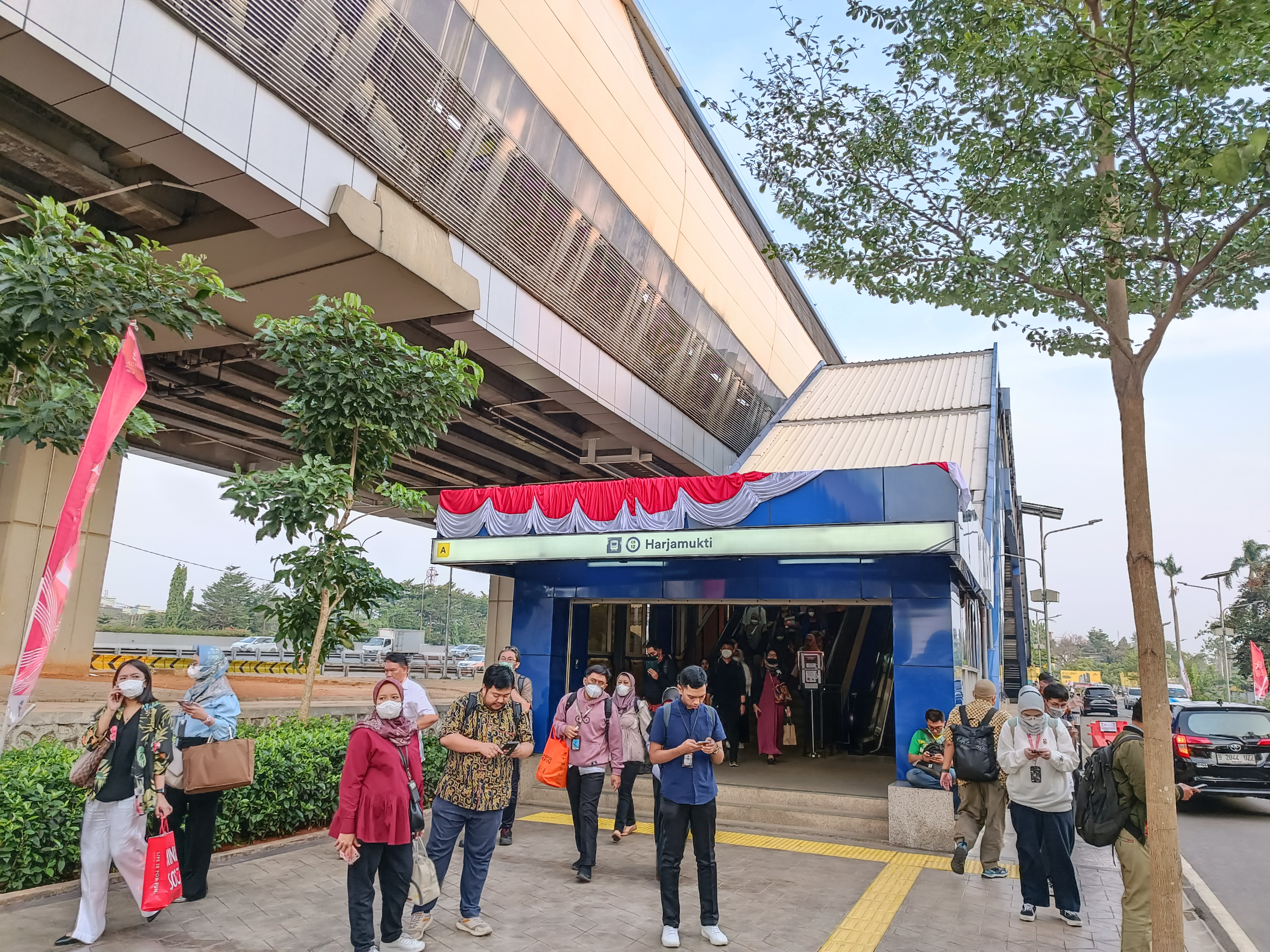
Harjamukti LRT station serves Cibubur Line, part of Jabodebek LRT.

Angkot is the major means of public transportation in Depok. Gojek and Grab and taxicabs are easily available. Depok is connected to other areas of greater Jakarta by KRL Commuterline, TransJakarta & Jabodebek LRT. Depok station, Depok Baru station, Universitas Indonesia station, Pondok Cina station, Citayam station and Pondok Rajeg station of KRL Commuterline commuter train service located within Depok. Commuter train and Light metro is widely used to travel to Jakarta city center and other parts of Greater Jakarta, but is very crowded during peak hours.

=== Air ===
Depok is served by Soekarno-Hatta International Airport and Halim Perdanakusuma International Airport. Meanwhile Pondok Cabe Airport is located at South Tangerang in borders with Depok, but does not have regular scheduled air service.

== Twin towns – sister cities ==
Depok is twinned with:

- Ōsaki, Japan

== See also ==
- 2020 Depok mayoral election
