= Cimanggis =

- District
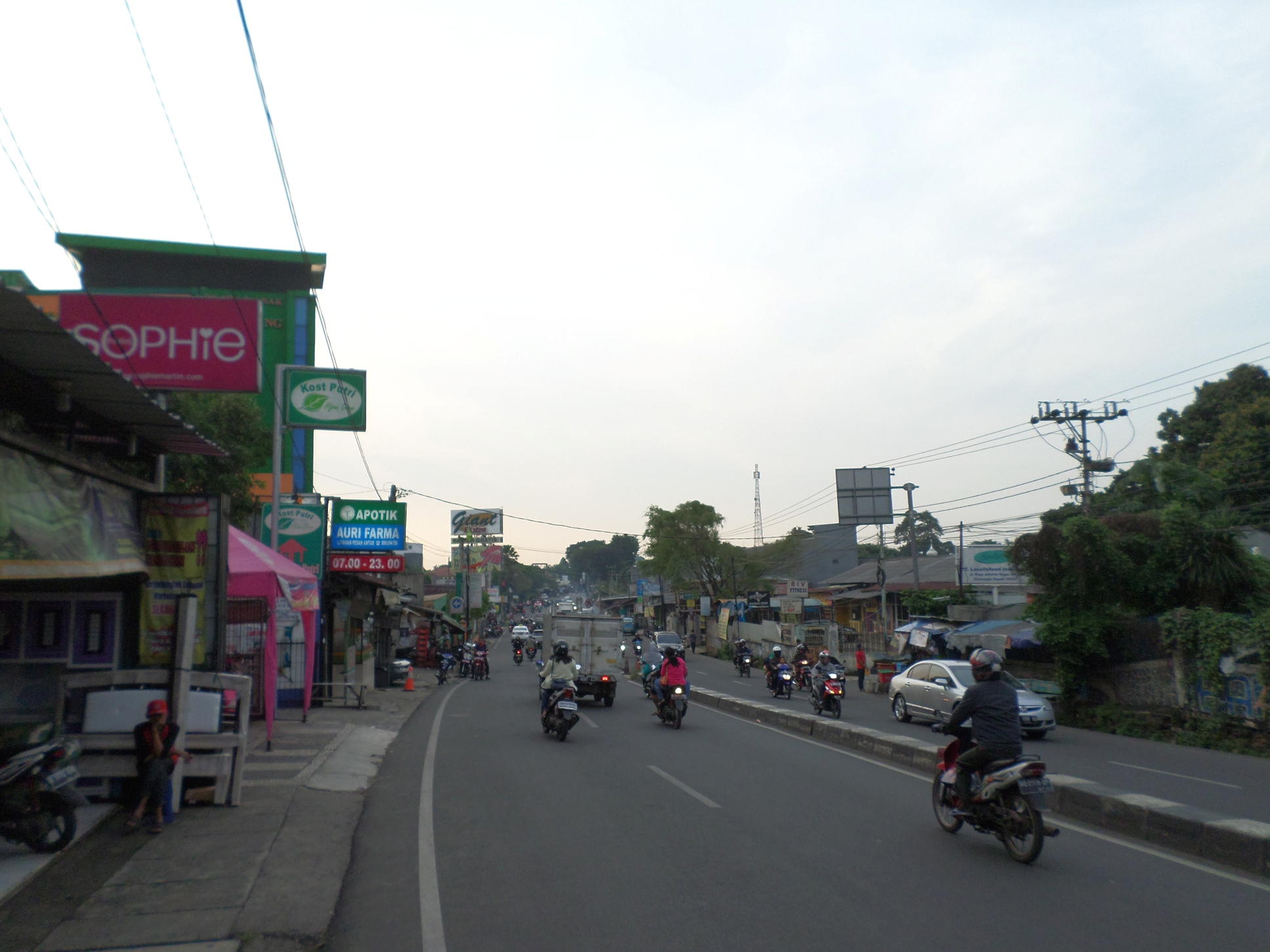
- Cimanggis

- Location in the city of Depok, Java and Indonesia Cimanggis (Java) Cimanggis (Indonesia)
- Coordinates: 6.364455°S 106.859138°E
- Country: Indonesia
- Region: Java
- Province: West Java
- City: Depok

Area
  - Total: 21.78 km^{2} (8.41 sq mi)
- Elevation: 64 m (210 ft)

Population (mid 2023 estimate)
  - Total: 252,370
  - Density: 11,590/km^{2} (30,010/sq mi)
- Time zone: UTC+7 (IWST)
- Area code: (+62) 21
- Vehicle registration: B
- Villages: 6
- Website: cimanggis.depok.go.id

Cimanggis is an administrative district (kecamatan) within the city of Depok, in the province of West Java, Indonesia. Cimanggis is located in the north of Depok, immediately south of Jakarta. It covers an area of 21.78 km^{2} and had a population of 241,979 at the 2010 Census and 252,000 at the 2020 Census; the latest official estimate (as at mid 2023) is 252,370.

== Populations ==
Cimanggis is sub-divided into six kelurahan (lit. 'subdistrict') listed below with their areas and their officially-estimated populations as at mid 2022, together with their postcodes.

Kode Wilayah	Name of kelurahan	Area in km^{2}	Population mid 2022 estimate	Post code
32.76.02.1007	Harjamukti	5.92	23,944	16454
32.76.02.1008	Curug	1.87	22,226	16453
32.76.02.1009	Tugu	5.42	84,855	16451
32.76.02.1010	Mekarsari	3.85	46,933	16452
32.76.02.1011	Pasir Gunung Selatan	2.71	33,109	16451
32.76.02.1012	Cisalak Pasar	1.81	24,276	16452
32.76.02	Totals	21.58	235,343	

comprising 118,442 males and 116,901 females.
