= Regions of Indonesia =

This is a list of some of the regions of Indonesia. Many regions are defined in law or regulations by the central government. At different times of Indonesia's history, the nation has been designated as having regions that do not necessarily correlate to the current administrative or physical geography of the territory of the nation.

== Geographical units ==
Regions of Indonesia according to ISO 3166-2:ID ID-SM ID-JW ID-KA ID-NU ID-SL ID-ML ID-PP

According to ISO 3166-2:ID, Indonesia is divided into seven geographical units, with each unit consisting of major islands or an island group. These geographical units are as follows:

Code	Geographical unit	Provinces	Population (mid-2025)	Projected (mid-2026)	Largest city	Highest point
ID-SM	Sumatra	Aceh, the Bangka Belitung Islands, Bengkulu, Jambi, Lampung, North Sumatra, Riau, the Riau Islands, South Sumatra, and West Sumatra	62,259,500	62,987,200	Medan	Mount Kerinci; 3,805 m (12484 ft)
ID-JW	Java	Banten, Central Java, East Java, the Special Capital Region of Jakarta, the Special Region of Yogyakarta, and West Java	158,079,100	159,194,600	Jakarta	Mount Semeru; 3,678 m (12067 ft)
ID-KA	Kalimantan	Central Kalimantan, East Kalimantan, North Kalimantan, South Kalimantan, and West Kalimantan	17,951,300	18,323,800	Samarinda	Mount Bukit Raya; 2,278 m (7,474 ft)
ID-NU	Nusa Tenggara (Lesser Sunda Islands)	Bali, West Nusa Tenggara, and East Nusa Tenggara	15,935,000	16,132,100	Denpasar	Mount Rinjani; 3,726 m (12,224 ft)
ID-SL	Sulawesi	Central Sulawesi, Gorontalo, North Sulawesi, South Sulawesi, Southeast Sulawesi, and West Sulawesi	21,044,800	21,275,400	Makassar	Latimojong; 3,478 m (11,411 ft)
ID-ML	Maluku Islands	Maluku and North Maluku	3,344,200	3,386,900	Ambon	Mount Binaiya; 3,027 m (9,931 ft)
ID-PP	Papua (Western New Guinea)	Central Papua, Highland Papua, Papua, South Papua, Southwest Papua, and West Papua	5,824,500	5,898,400	Jayapura	Puncak Jaya; 4,884 m (16,024 ft)

== Eastern Indonesia and Western Indonesia ==
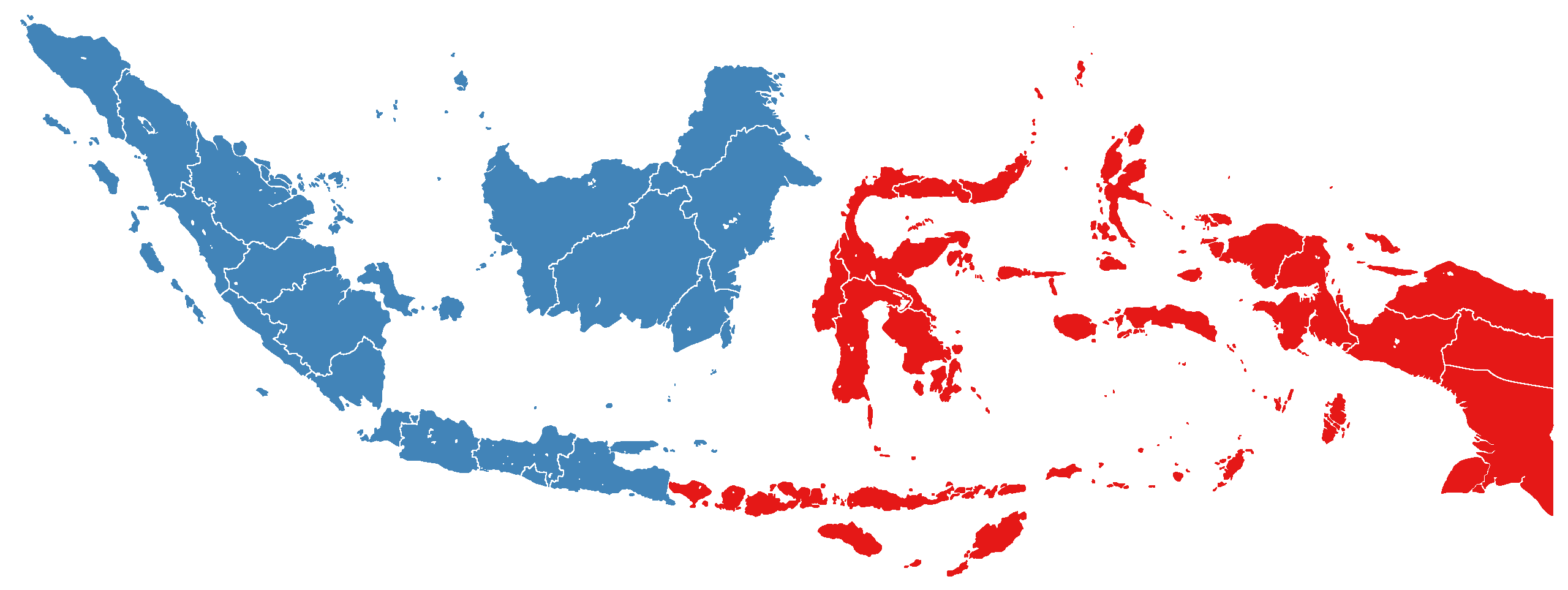
Western Indonesia (blue) and Eastern Indonesia (red)

During the last stages of the Dutch colonial era, the area east of Java and Kalimantan was known as the Great East and later known as Eastern Indonesia. On 24 December 1946, the State of East Indonesia was formed covering the same area (excluding Western New Guinea). It was a component of the United States of Indonesia, and was dissolved into the unitary Republic of Indonesia on 17 August 1950. Currently, Eastern Indonesia consists of 17 provinces: Bali, East Nusa Tenggara, West Nusa Tenggara, Central Sulawesi, Gorontalo, North Sulawesi, South Sulawesi, Southeast Sulawesi, West Sulawesi, Maluku, North Maluku, Central Papua, Highland Papua, Papua, South Papua, Southwest Papua, and West Papua. Meanwhile, the region comprising the other 21 provinces in Sumatra, Java, and Kalimantan is known as Western Indonesia.

== Development regions ==
According to the National Development Planning Agency, Indonesia is divided into four main development regions: each is led by the major cities of Medan, Jakarta, Surabaya, and Makassar.

Four main development regions of Indonesia

Main development region	Central city	Development region	Province(s)
Main Development Region A (Wilayah Pembangunan Utama A)	Medan	Development Region I	Aceh and North Sumatra
Main Development Region A (Wilayah Pembangunan Utama A)	Medan	Development Region II	Riau, the Riau Islands, and West Sumatra
Main Development Region B (Wilayah Pembangunan Utama B)	Jakarta	Development Region III	The Bangka Belitung Islands, Bengkulu, Jambi, and South Sumatra
Main Development Region B (Wilayah Pembangunan Utama B)	Jakarta	Development Region IV	Lampung, Banten, Central Java, the Special Capital Region of Jakarta, the Special Region of Yogyakarta, and West Java
Main Development Region B (Wilayah Pembangunan Utama B)	Jakarta	Development Region V	West Kalimantan
Main Development Region C (Wilayah Pembangunan Utama C)	Surabaya	Development Region VI	East Java and Bali
Main Development Region C (Wilayah Pembangunan Utama C)	Surabaya	Development Region VII	Central Kalimantan, East Kalimantan, North Kalimantan, and South Kalimantan
Main Development Region D (Wilayah Pembangunan Utama D)	Makassar	Development Region VIII	East Nusa Tenggara, West Nusa Tenggara, South Sulawesi, Southeast Sulawesi, and West Sulawesi
Main Development Region D (Wilayah Pembangunan Utama D)	Makassar	Development Region IX	Central Sulawesi, Gorontalo, and North Sulawesi
Main Development Region D (Wilayah Pembangunan Utama D)	Makassar	Development Region X	Maluku, North Maluku, Central Papua, Highland Papua, Papua, South Papua, Southwest Papua, and West Papua

== See also ==
- List of regions of Vietnam
- Regions of Thailand
- Subdivisions of Indonesia
