= List of banks in Afghanistan =

This is a list of banks in Afghanistan.

== Central bank ==
- Da Afghanistan Bank

== State-owned banks ==
- Bank Millie Afghan
- Pashtany Bank
- New Kabul Bank

== Local banks ==
- Islamic Bank of Afghanistan
- Afghanistan International Bank
- Azizi Bank
- Maiwand Bank
- Bank-e-Millie Afghan
- First MicroFinance Bank-Afghanistan
- Ghazanfar bank
- Afghan United Bank
