= Fitrat =

Fitrat may refer to:

- Fitra, innate nature of humans in Islam
- Fitrat (TV series), Pakistani romantic drama television series
- Fittrat, 2019 Indian romantic drama web series by Ekta Kapoor

== People ==
- Abdul Qadir Fitrat, Afghan banker
- Abdurauf Fitrat (1886-1938), Uzbek author, journalist and politician
- Bihari Lal Fitrat (born 1829), historian of India
- Fasihuddin Fitrat, Afghan military leader and politician
- Sadiq Fitrat (born 1935, known as Nashenas), Afghan musician
