= Shakir Jalali =

Governor of the Afghanistan Central Bank

Shakir Jalali ډاکټر شاکر جلالي

Governor of Da Afghanistan Bank
- Acting
- In office 8 October 2021 – March 2023
- Leader: Hibatullah Akhundzada
- Preceded by: Haji Mohammad Idris (acting)
- Succeeded by: Hidayatullah Badri (acting)

Personal details
- Profession: politician

Shakir Jalali (ډاکټر شاکر جلالي) was the acting governor of the Da Afghanistan Bank between October 2021 and March 2023.
