= Noorullah Delwari =

Former governor of Afghan central bank

Governor of Da Afghanistan Bank
- In office 2011–2014
- Preceded by: Abdul Qadir Fitrat

Governor of Da Afghanistan Bank
- In office 2004–2007
- Preceded by: Anwar ul-Haq Ahady

Noorulah Delawari is a former Governor of the central bank of Afghanistan, Da Afghanistan Bank, he served from 2004 to 2007 and from 2011 to 2014.

== Early life ==
Delawari was born in Kabul on November 23, 1942. He studied in the UK and the US and stayed in the US after the invasion of the Soviet Union in Afghanistan in 1979. He served for sixteen years at Lloyds Bank of California, rising to be vice-president and head of its international division.

Delawari returned to Afghanistan in early 2002, to work as senior advisor to the minister of Finance. In 2003, he founded the Afghanistan Investment Support Agency and served as its president until November 2004, when he became head of Da Afghanistan Bank in 2005. Although the House of the People initially rejected his appointment as governor of the central bank in 2006, he stayed on as governor until 2007.

After 2007, Delawari became Chief of an Afghan Investment Support NGO and was reappointed as Governor of Da Afghanistan Bank in November 2011, after previous governor Abdul Qadir Fitrat in the aftermath following the Kabul Bank scandal. Fitrat claimed he was under threat for investigating fraud at the privately owned Kabul Bank. Delawari had a good record from his previous stint as director of the bank, the trusted acquaintance of Karzai kept his position until he handed in his resignation on 6 December 2014. Delawari currently serves as co-chairman of The Private Sector and Civil Society Enabling Council.
