= Craig Whitlock =

American journalist

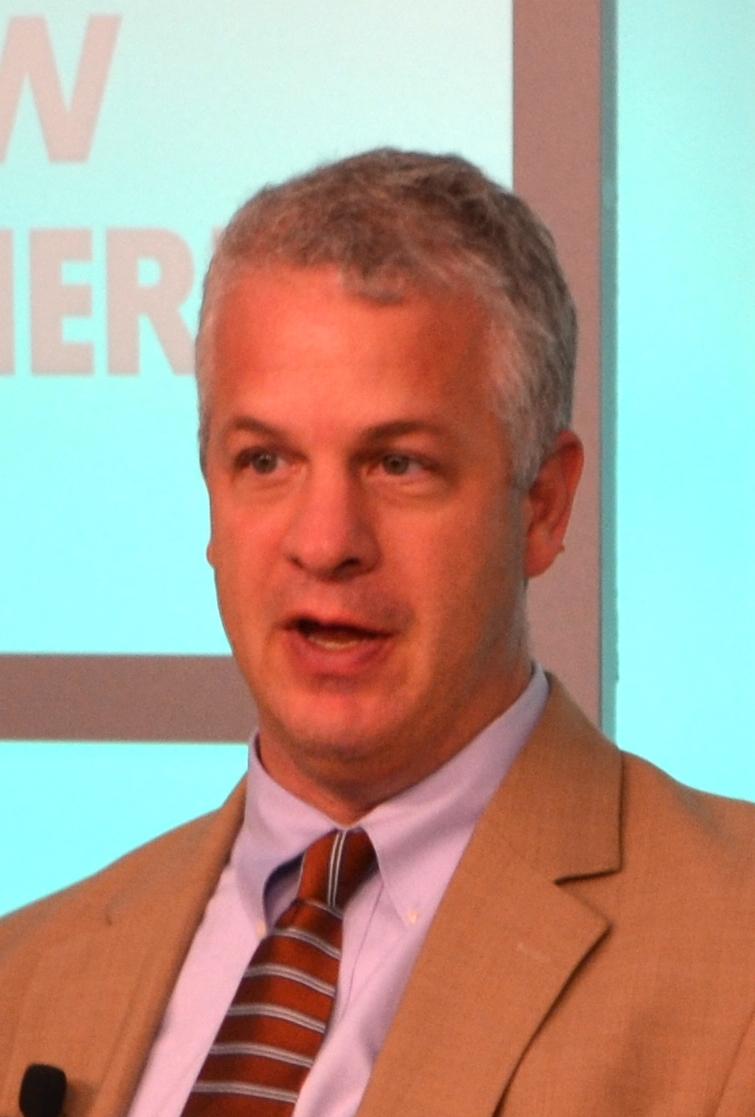
- Whitlock in 2015
- Born: Craig Michael Whitlock; March 26, 1968 (age 58); Ithaca, New York, U.S.
- Education: Duke University
- Occupation: Journalist
- Known for: The Afghanistan Papers: A Secret History of the War
- Spouse: Jennifer Toth (m. 1996; died 2025)

Craig Michael Whitlock (born March 26, 1968) is an American journalist working for The Washington Post, where he is responsible for covering the Pentagon and national security.

In 2021, he published his first book, The Afghanistan Papers: A Secret History of the War. The work debuted at number one on The New York Times nonfiction best-seller list.

== Early life and education ==
Craig Michael Whitlock was born in Ithaca, New York. He is the son of Dr. Robert Whitlock, a professor of veterinary medicine at the University of Pennsylvania in Philadelphia. He was raised in Kennett Square, Pennsylvania. In 1986, he graduated from Unionville High School, where he was editor of the school newspaper The Indian Post (now known as the Unionville Post). He received a bachelor's degree in history from Duke University, where he was editor of student paper The Chronicle.

== Career ==
Prior to joining The Washington Post, Whitlock worked for seven years as a reporter for The News & Observer of Raleigh, North Carolina. He was also briefly a staff writer for The Anniston Star of Anniston, Alabama. He is a journalist for The Washington Post and is assigned to the Investigative Desk, where he covers national security. He has worked as a staff writer for the Post since 1998, and covered the Maryland Statehouse in Annapolis and the Prince George's County police department. From 2010 until 2016, he reported on the Pentagon for the National Desk. For almost six years, Whitlock served as the paper's Berlin bureau chief and covered terrorism networks in Europe, South Asia, the Middle East, and North Africa. He has reported from over 60 countries.

Whitlock is also known for writing the Afghanistan Papers, a book containing a series of interviews conducted by the Special Inspector General for Afghanistan Reconstruction covering information about the reconstruction effort in Afghanistan. The coverage focused on the difference between public and private statements voiced by U.S. government officials about the progress and success of the overall war effort. Public statements about the war in Afghanistan usually portrayed a more positive picture than statements reflected in those interviews.

In August 2021, Whitlock published his debut book, The Afghanistan Papers: A Secret History of the War. Shortly before its publication, Whitlock discussed Afghanistan in an appearance on Real Time with Bill Maher. The book debuted at number one on The New York Times nonfiction best-seller list for the week ending September 4, 2021. The book was also included in the Wall Street Journal best-selling books list. The book was reviewed by Kirkus Reviews, New York, The Guardian, and The Sunday Times. It was selected for The Washington Post's "10 Best Books of 2021" list.

== Personal life ==
In 1996, he married journalist Jennifer Toth. They remained married until her death in 2025. He has a son and lives in Silver Spring, Maryland.

== Awards and honors ==
He was awarded the German Marshall Fund's 2005 Peter R. Weitz senior prize for his coverage of international terrorist networks. He is also a three-time finalist for the Pulitzer Prize, most recently in 2013 for national reporting on counterterrorism, and received the National Press Club's Michael A. Dornheim Award - along with Nate Jones - in 2023.

== Bibliography ==
- The Afghanistan Papers: A Secret History of the War. New York: Simon & Schuster. August 31, 2021. ISBN 978-1-9821-5900-9.
- Fat Leonard: How One Man Bribed, Bilked, and Seduced the U.S. Navy. New York: Simon & Schuster. May 14, 2024. ISBN 978-1-9821-3163-0.
