= Corruption in Afghanistan =

Corruption in Afghanistan is a widespread and growing problem in society. Transparency International's 2025 Corruption Perceptions Index ranks the country in 169th place out of 182 countries. The 182 countries of the Index are scored on a scale from 0 ("highly corrupt") to 100 ("very clean") according to the perceived corruption in the public sector, and then ranked by their score. Afghanistan's 2025 ranking is based on a score of 17. The best score among those countries of the Asia Pacific region that appeared in the Index (Note: Afghanistan, Australia, Bangladesh, Bhutan, Brunei Darussalam, Cambodia, China, Fiji, Hong Kong, India, Indonesia, Japan, North Korea, South Korea, Laos, Malaysia, Maldives, Mongolia, Myanmar, Nepal, New Zealand, Pakistan, Papua New Guinea, Philippines, Singapore, Solomon Islands, Sri Lanka, Taiwan, Thailand, Timor-Leste, Vanuatu, Vietnam) was 84, the average score was 45 and the worst score was 15. For comparison with worldwide scores, the best score was 89 (ranked 1), the average score was 42, and the worst score was 9 (ranked 181, in a two-way tie). The Taliban significantly, if briefly, tackled corruption upon taking power in 2021; Afghanistan was ranked in 150th place in the 2022 Corruption Perceptions Index, following a ranking of 174th in 2021.

"In opinion surveys of Afghans," noted the Asia Foundation in a 2012 report, "corruption is consistently singled out as a problem."

One of the recent major corruption cases was the 2010–13 Kabul Bank financial scandal involving Mahmood Karzai and others close to President Hamid Karzai. The Kabul Bank scandal, crisis, investigation and trial involved Sherkhan Farnood, Khalilullah Fruzi, Mohammed Fahim, and other insiders who were allegedly spending the bank's US$1 billion for their personal lavish living style as well as lending money under the table to family, friends, and those close to President Hamid Karzai and Mahmood Karzai. As of October 2012, the government only recovered $180 million of the $980 million fraudulent loans.

A U.N. survey listed corruption and insecurity as the two issues of greatest concern to Afghans as of 2012. The New York Times has written that in Afghanistan, "corruption can no longer be described as a cancer on the system: It is the system." The U.S. Agency for International Development stated in 2009 that corruption in Afghanistan had "become pervasive, entrenched, systemic, and by all accounts now unprecedented in scale and reach."

In a 2011 survey by the Asia Foundation, Afghans said corruption was their "third biggest problem (21%) after insecurity (35%) and unemployment (23%)." In 2010 and 2011, they said corruption was their second most important reason for feeling pessimistic about Afghanistan (16% in 2011 and 27% in 2010). In 2011, they identified administrative corruption as the government's second most important failure (25%). This marked an improvement over 2010, when the figure was 30%.

In Afghanistan today, corruption most often takes the form of demanding and offering bribes, both in the private and public sectors and on large and small scales. There are also many other major forms of corruption, including nepotism, graft, and illegal land transfers. The US Special Inspector General for Afghan Reconstruction (SIGAR) has estimated that over half of the nation's annual customs revenue is lost to graft.

In a 2015 article, Parag R. Dharmavarapu noted that while Afghanistan's GDP had quintupled since 2002, the society remained riddled with corruption. "What is extremely disconcerting about corruption in Afghanistan," wrote Dharmavarapu, "is not simply the number or value of bribes that take place; instead, it is the endemic nature of corruption within the Afghan government". Routinely, noted Dharmavarapu, "police officers extort goods from shopkeepers, levy taxes on vehicles at highway checkpoints, and impose fines on individuals unable to produce proper identification documents." Some police officers "turn a blind eye to or even collude with criminals and insurgents," while mid- to high-level police officials "collaborate with criminals in smuggling, kidnapping for ransom and other illegal activities, collecting thousands of dollars in the process." Top police officials "have siphoned millions of dollars from international donors to their own pockets." The most common types of corruption in Afghanistan, according to Dharmavarapu, are:

- Petty bribery – Asking for small gifts (baksheesh) in exchange for special treatment or favors
- Position buying – Awarding opportunities in the police force, judiciary or civil service based on bribes as opposed to merit
- Nepotism/clientelism – Awarding positions based on personal relationship/kinship networks rather than merit
- Offering and asking for preferential treatment – This includes giving bribes to expedite the processing of business documents or access to government-owned land
- Grand corruption – Corruption that involves political elites on a large scale
- National police and law enforcement graft

According to the High Office of Oversight and Anti-Corruption (HOOAC), corruption is rampant in the north of the country, particularly, Balkh Province which borders neighboring Uzbekistan, a country with similar corruption problems. One of the worst manifestations of graft is illegal land grabbing. Shamsullah Javed, HOOAC head for the northern zone, in an exclusive interview with Pajhwok Afghan News, explained that "in Balkh, there are three kinds of encroachment on land: One government department seizing the property of another, security forces occupying government land and individuals taking unlawful possession of people's land." He revealed that 52 out of 60 housing schemes in Balkh were executed illegally. "Government servants, from top to bottom, are involved in the scourge ... Some people, whose interests are hurt by investigations into corruption cases, are creating problems for us," Javed said.

Investigative journalist Sibel Edmonds has undertaken efforts as a journalist and whistleblower to raise awareness about corruption in Afghanistan and waste, fraud and abuse involving billions of dollars of U.S. taxpayers' money lost to corruption and corrupt officials in Afghanistan following the U.S. intervention.

"The great challenge to Afghanistan's future isn't the Taliban, or the Pakistani safe havens or even an incipiently hostile Pakistan," Gen. John R. Allen told a U.S. Senate Foreign Relations subcommittee in 2014. "The existential threat to the long-term viability of modern Afghanistan is corruption." He stated that the insurgency, criminal patronage networks, and drug traffickers had formed "an unholy alliance".

There is a consensus that the pervasive corruption was the main cause of the fall of the Islamic Republic of Afghanistan. Failures of both Hamid Karzai and Ashraf Ghani's administrations to fight corruption causes the erosion of the government's legitimacy and the Afghan people lose trust in the government and these factors leads to the fall of the government in August 2021.

== Background ==
The Center for American Progress has attributed corruption in Afghanistan to decades of conflict that have prevented the formation of effective state institutions and civil society groups, to laws and regulations that are poorly enforced, to anti-corruption agencies that often contradict one another and lack resources, and to the fact that soldiers and police are often illiterate and public employees often underpaid and undertrained. Decades of constant warfare, moreover, allow public officials to fill their private accounts with government funds. Also, tribal and ethnic traditions encourage people to use their positions to benefit relatives. Afghanistan's official institutions are riddled with incompetence, compelling rural folk to "rely on networks of regional and local power-holders to maintain order and provide basic services."

According to the World Bank, Afghan traditions of patronage have resulted in a constant tampering of merit-based appointments to public positions, presidential staff, member in Parliament, military commanders, and any position relating to political influence—all of which has resulted in massive corruption, which has been exacerbated by massive foreign assistance and a narcotics trade so large that it has warped the Afghan economy.

After the U.S. overthrew the Taliban in 2001, corruption, which had been common in pre-Taliban Afghanistan, once again became a major feature of Afghan life, spreading to virtually every branch of the government and even to regional localities. A broad network of political elites tied to President Hamid Karzai positioned themselves as middlemen between Western officials and donors, on the one hand, and ordinary Afghans, on the other, using these positions to divert billions of dollars in foreign aid and investment to their private accounts and those of their allies. This resulted in several high-profile scandals, notably the Kabul Bank crisis in which revelations were made that the largest financial institution in the country had been operating as a Ponzi scheme at the benefit of the elite few tied to Karzai.

A February 2014 Pentagon report charged the U.S. government with upholding a government that is enveloped in corruption in Afghanistan after the 2001 invasion through its support for warlords, its reliance on private trucking contracts, and its provision of billions of aid dollars. Initially, the U.S. supported existing patronage networks and gave some warlords government positions. This legitimization of warlords allowed them to begin using their official power to embezzle public resources. Also, because large amounts of official resources were diverted to the post-war rebuilding effort, many government workers found themselves severely underpaid and felt obliged to take bribes in order to survive.

"Corruption directly threatens the viability and legitimacy of the Afghan state," said the Pentagon report, which stated that American forces found themselves engulfed in regional warlord corruption and protection rackets. According to report, the nation lacked any pre-existing resources to combat corruption, owing in part to late intelligence of Afghan corruption, a lack of physical security, and a lack of the international community's will to address the issues at hand. The report stated that after the 2001 invasion the U.S. had "empowered" warlords by putting them into government posts, which they were able to exploit to appropriate government resources and form corruption networks. Karzai was dependent on these warlords, who were essential to both business and politics in Afghanistan.

The Asia Foundation stated in 2012 that the widespread corruption in Afghanistan is not culturally ingrained in the Afghan people, noting that the average Afghan consider current levels of corruption as much greater than in decades past, and believe that corruption was worse under Hamid Karzai, who was acting president and then president between 2001 and 2010, than under the five previous regimes. One reason why some Afghans liked, and still like, the Taliban, despite its violence and brutality, was that it promised a relief from the graft and injustice practiced by mujahideen warlords. The Asia Foundation added that the perceived root of corruption in the nation had changed during the previous five years. Earlier, most Afghans believed that corruption was due to low salaries of civil servants, whereas currently it is attributed to a lack of sanctions and a lack of competent law enforcement.

== Attitudes toward corruption ==
On the one hand, Afghans criticize corruption; on the other hand, they increasingly accept patronage and bribery as inevitable and even legitimate parts of daily life. A UN study found that in 2012, 68% of Afghans found it acceptable for civil servants to bolster their salary by charging bribes to service users. This represented an increase from 42% in 2009. Also, 67% found it acceptable for at least some civil servants to be hired because of family ties and friendship networks. (This rose from 42% in 2009.)

The Asia Foundation's 2011 survey "shows that while Afghans associate democracy with general freedom, they do not associate it with less corruption, more rights, laws, and more inclusive government." On the contrary, they feel that democracy and the free market result in chaos and higher risk for ordinary Afghans while the already-powerful are provided with additional opportunities. The feeling of injustice that results from widespread corruption reportedly strengthens support for terrorists.

== Forms of corruption ==
Afghans have identified over 70 types of corruption that affect them personally, "ranging from public administration and elected bodies to private sector, international aid, and the Taliban." Afghans identify corruption mostly with government institutions but have experienced it in many sectors.

=== Bribery ===
Bribes must be paid in Afghanistan to secure most public services. A UN study shows that the completion of public services is reliant almost solely on bribes paid and has resulted in a severe hampering of economic growth. Petty bribery has been the leading cause of distress among the average citizens of Afghanistan, although it is generally only the high-level corruption cases that are reported in major media.

Prosecutors, teachers, judges, and customs officials are the most likely public employees to receive bribes. The average bribe to prosecutors and judges is over US$300. Bribes to other officials are somewhat lower. In 85% of cases, bribes are directly or indirectly requested by public officials; in 13% of cases, they are offered spontaneously by citizens. Some officials request bribes through intermediaries. According to the U.N., 50 percent of Afghans paid bribes in 2012; in some parts of the country, the figure was as high as 70 percent. Half of Afghans had bribed teachers, with similar numbers paying bribes to customs officials, judges, and prosecutors. A somewhat smaller number had bribed land registry officials and provincial officers. The bribing of judges declined significantly between 2009 and 2012. The percentage of persons paying bribes to teachers climbed from 16% in 2009 to 51% in 2012. Doctors, nurses, and paramedics account for 15 to 20% of bribes.

In 2013, 43% of Afghans viewed civil servants and bureaucrats as corrupt, while 58% said they paid a bribe to Registry and Permit Services, 44% to Tax Revenue and 40% to Land Services. In 2012, half of Afghans bribed customs officials. The bribing of customs and tax and revenue officers rose between 2009 and 2012. In 52% of Afghan households, at least one member has applied for a public sector job, and 45% paid bribes to help secure the jobs.

While almost 30% of Afghans paid bribes to secure private-sector services in 2012, 50% did so to secure public-sector services. Public-sector bribery is more prevalent in western and northeastern Afghanistan and less in the southern and central regions.

By far the most common motive for bribery is the desire to facilitate or hasten the delivery of a public service (59.4%). Other motives include the desire to reduce the cost of a procedure (10.6%), to avoid paying a fine (13.3%), and to receive improved treatment (6.7%). Most cases, states a 2012 UN report, involve bribes for better or faster services, while other bribes are made to influence court cases and legal decisions, thus undermining the rule of law. It was reported that 24% of bribes offered to the police were for the express purpose of releasing imprisoned suspects or to avoid imprisonment altogether.

According to a UN report, administrative bribery places the greatest economic hardship on regular Afghan citizens and their families.

=== Education system ===
The chief form of corruption in the education sector involves so-called "ghost teachers" and double-registered teachers. Anything involving paperwork in the educational system requires small bribes.

A SIGAR report stated that senior officials at the Ministry of Education had intentionally falsified data on the number of schools and teachers in the nation in order to over-bill international aid providers. As a result, millions of US taxpayer dollars have been used to pay for nonexistent schools and teachers, and enriching the dishonest education officials in Afghanistan.

A February 2012 article in Gulf Today explored the fact that in many Afghan schools there are many no-show teachers, teachers who know nothing about their subjects, and teachers who cannot even read or write. Only 20% of funds budgeted for teachers' salaries in one province went to actual teachers; the rest went to local security or education officials who receive the "ghost teacher's" salary in their place.

=== Graft in customs system ===
A December 2014 report focused on graft within the customs system. Although many experts identified such graft as a primary cause of the government's shortfall of revenue goals the previous year, it was noted that little had been done thus far to address the problem. Customs agents were identified as the most glaring offenders, with the report noting that they in most circumstances appointed by ministers with the express understanding that financial kickbacks are to be given for the position.

=== Cash smuggling ===
The Washington Post reported in December 2012 that the US had provided the Afghan government with bulk currency counters at airports to help prevent cash smuggling. In response, the Afghan government provided a way for VIPs to bypass the machines.

=== Nepotism and patronage ===
Outside observers have noted that the Afghan people view what Westerners consider "favoritism" or "nepotism" as the right thing to do, since they believe themselves to be taking care of their extended family. "You take care of your own. Period. It just happens that when you do that with public funds and positions, people tend to get a little persnickety about it. While admitting that they would do the exact same thing."

The Asia Foundation describes the central route of growing corruption in Afghanistan as the strength of patronage politics in the country. While patronage is a centuries-long Afghan tradition, it is now an integral part of the society, and its entanglement with criminal activities is a growing concern. Because of patronage, people without connections have great difficulty rising within the Afghan government. While corrupt officials enjoy impunity, honest officials are often denied access to powerful positions.

=== Judicial corruption ===
According to surveys by both Transparency International and the U.N., Afghans consider the judiciary their society's most corrupt segment.

Judicial corruption is said to be an endemic problem in the country that affects every level of the legal system. "From granting judicial access and selecting the deposition of cases to extorting money from defendants for favorable decisions, corrupt justices are able to line their pockets with hundreds of thousands of dollars in bribes." Judges are subject to the influence of warlords, terrorists, and others; most judges are appointed as the result of "under-the-table deals," and are largely unqualified by all legal standards. Interviews carried out in 2013 with people who had lost lawsuits indicated that the winning party had bribed the court. Judges and prosecutors are believed to accept bribes to bar a case from going to court, making evidence and witnesses vanish from court evidence. There is no oversight of courts by other government branches and no transparency in Supreme Court decisions.

==== Zahoruddin case ====
In December 2012, a senior judge named Zahoruddin was convicted of seeking to extort bribes from Dewa, a 22-year-old freelance journalist, who had filed for divorce. After she had refused to bribe him, he offered to marry her in exchange for granting the divorce. Dewa secretly recorded the entire conversation, and sent the tape to the Supreme Court. After a case was brought against Zahoruddin, she received a death threat from him. His conviction was described by Radio Free Europe/Radio Liberty as a rare victory in the struggle against corruption in Afghanistan.

==== Ishaqza case ====
In 2014, a leading opium trafficker, Haji Lal Jan Ishaqzai, was arrested in Afghanistan by the Counter Narcotics Police, but he soon was freed in exchange for bribes. It was almost a week until the Afghan counternarcotics authorities in Kabul was informed that Ishaqzai was freed, reported The New York Times. He fled to Pakistan where he was beyond the scope of Afghan or American law enforcement. Several judicial officials were arrested, and some sources said that the Supreme Court was directly involved in letting Ishaqzai go, but it was unclear who exactly was responsible for his release.

=== Corruption at traffic stops ===
Corruption in Afghanistan's traffic department, according to a February 2013 article in The Washington Post, is among the worst of the nation's fledgling bureaucracies. Vehicle registration requires 27 separate signatures. A new driver's license calls for "about a dozen stamps from ministries, agencies and banks." These requirements have led to the formation of a black market that involves the bribing of public officials in order to expedite traffic documents. "It's corruption in $30 or $40 bites—far from the millions allegedly stolen here every year," stated the Post. However, these bribes have warped the perception Afghans hold on their nation's institutions. The Post quoted an official who earns $10,000 annually on such corruption, who stated that the corrupt system is disadvantageous for everyone, including many of those involved in the scheme. The department's red tape has earned it the reputation as the most exploitive one in the government, stated the Post.

A May 2014 article about corruption at traffic stops, told the story of U.S. Army Col. John Graham, deputy leader of NATO's Regional Command-Capital, who was asked by Lt. Col. Farhad Safi, an "idealistic, young police commander in charge of a 'ring of steel' of traffic checkpoints cordoning central Kabul against car bombers and suicide attacks," to help arrange for security cameras and thus prevent bribery at those checkpoints.

=== Illegal land transfers ===
One form of corruption that has come to the fore since 2001 is the confiscation of land. In 2003, slum dwellings in the Sherpoor neighborhood of Kabul were destroyed and replaced by residences for cabinet members. Similar actions have followed. Land has been illegally distributed by the executive to political elites in order to win their allegiance. More than 80% of new land in Kabul was distributed under the auspices of Afghan elites and high officials. Ex-warlords have made money illicitly in a range of fields and then laundered it by purchasing real estate.

=== Physical infrastructure ===
Corruption is common in the physical infrastructure sector, and involves criminal patronage networks. The construction business involves hundreds of millions of dollars' worth of bribes that benefit a massive network.

=== Police ===
The Afghan National Police (ANP) are considered notoriously corrupt. The Ministry of the Interior has been criticized for "failing to properly account for billions of dollars allocated for police salaries via a U.N.-administered trust fund." Corruption robs police officers of up to half of their salaries, which makes them more likely to solicit bribes. A 2012 Asia Foundation survey found that over half of Afghans who had dealt with an ANP officer during the previous year had been forced to pay a bribe.

Beginning in 2009, policemen in parts of Afghanistan began to be paid through their cell phones, which prevented their superiors from skimming off part of their wages. According to MIT Technology Review, the bribes had been so immense that on their first pay period on the phone system, the police officers believed they had received a pay raise, when in fact they were simply receiving their full pay without any administrative bribes or extortion taking place.

Reuters reported in August 2011 that "an expanding dossier of unresolved police violence and corruption cases ... have alienated Afghans," and that this called into question the feasibility of rebuilding the civic institutions of the war-torn nation.

Fox News reported in October 2014 that Afghan officials may have systematically stolen $300 million from a UNDP trust fund used to pay police officers in Afghanistan and that European Union donors had withheld about $100 million in contributions to the fund owing to concerns about the fund's management. The UNDP itself stated that it was not the agency's responsibility to address this corruption.

Some police officers, according to a 2015 report, have informed the Taliban of impending operations, presumably in exchange for bribes.

=== Military ===
The Afghan National Army is considered more professional than the ANP but also experiences a significant misallocation of resources and immense levels of bribery solicitation. In a 2013 Transparency International survey, one-fifth of Afghans said they considered the military corrupt.

The New York Times reported in March 2012 that Afghan defense officials were impeding a probe into whether Afghan Air Force members were trafficking in opium and weapons and that an Afghan officer who had killed eight members of the US military in 2011 may have been involved in trafficking. For example, investigators were only given limited access to military personnel with any evidence to report, and were denied access to areas of the airport where smuggling was still suspected to be underway.

As a result of corruption, according to a 2014 report, the Department of Defense had lost account of over 200,000 weapons allotted to the ANSF and ANP. Those weapons, as well as ammunition, had reportedly been sold by police and security officers to the Taliban.

In early 2015, the oversight committee for Ministry of Defence contracts uncovered a kickback scheme involving payment by the ministry of over $200 million to fuel contractors. After an investigation, the contracts were cancelled and senior ministry officials fired.

In May 2015, Newsweek reported that Taliban insurgents were buying U.S.-supplied weapons from Afghan forces. The Pentagon "lost track of many of the 465,000 light weapons the U.S. supplied to Afghan security forces."

== Role of Karzai ==
Haroun Mir of Afghanistan's Center for Research and Policy Studies (ACRPS) and Business Integrity Network Afghanistan (BINA) noted in June 2015 that Hamid Karzai, Acting President of Afghanistan from 2001 to 2004 and President from 2004 to 2014, had been widely accused of perpetuating and initiating the corrupt economic system of the country through a patronage system that resembled a mafia. As a result, corruption is now considered an ingrained and accepted facet of Afghan culture, and is no longer seen as a taboo.

In a December 2012 speech, Karzai blamed corruption in Afghanistan on the countries that fund his government. "Corruption in Afghanistan is a reality, a bitter reality," Karzai said. "The part of this corruption that is in our offices is a small part: that is bribes. The other part of corruption, the large part, is hundreds of millions dollars that are not ours. We shouldn't blame ourselves for that. That part is from others and imposed on us." The Army Times, reporting on the speech, noted that Karzai had aligned himself with populist stances against his own foreign allies, placing blame of the nation's problems on outsiders rather than his own government.

On February 10, 2013, Frank Vogl, author of Waging War on Corruption, called the Karzai government "a cesspool of corruption" in which tens of billions of U.S. taxpayer money had been looted.

Bloomberg reported on April 30, 2013, that the CIA had funneled tens of millions of dollars in discreet payments to Karzai "in suitcases, backpacks and shopping bags." Former CIA official Reuel Gerecht said that Karzai likely has a patronage system bolstered by a cash scheme, since it would not be maintainable without support from the Pashtuns. Vincent Cannistraro, a former CIA counterterrorism chief, said that given Karzai's poor relations with the US, the money is not being used in an efficient manner.

In July 2013, Joel Brinkley wrote in The Baltimore Sun that Karzai's government was attempting to levy a US$1,000 customs fee on every U.S. vehicle operating in a non-combat role in and out of the country, and that Afghan troops had been blocking roads in expectation of payment. Brinkley, as well as other experts, have criticized Karzai's methods of extorting American personnel and investors while accepting their patronage and protection, since most of the military equipment in the nation serves to protect his government.

In July 2015, Philanthropy Daily noted that American journalist Sarah Chayes, who in 2002 founded a charity called Afghans for Civil Society in collaboration with Karzai's brother Qayum, had been so disturbed by how much of her charity went to payoffs and bribes to shadowy figures that she left the charity in 2005, thereafter becoming an advisor on Afghan corruption to Joint Chiefs of Staff chairman Admiral Mike Mullen. Chayes was especially critical of corruption at the top levels of the Afghan government and Karzai family, which was known to US officials but ignored by them due to their focus of finalizing military campaigns rather than cleaning up the corrupt ring ruling the government. She went on to write a 2015 book, Thieves of State, about official corruption.

== Impact of corruption ==
SIGAR has called corruption a major impediment to the process of stabilizing and reconstructing Afghanistan. "Corruption is now widely acknowledged as having a significant impact on state building, development, and private sector growth in policy documents," stated the Asia Foundation in 2012. In 2013, Gen. John R. Allen, who at the time was in charge of international forces in Afghanistan, told President Obama that corruption is the greatest strategic and existential threat to the fledgling Afghan nation. Widespread corruption aids the insurgency because widens the gap between citizens and the ruling elite, an Integrity Watch official said in 2013, adding that the international community has not "lived up to its international commitment ... to address corruption." A January 2014 report by Reuters stated that thousands of homeless Afghans were suffering because of corruption. "The task-force meant to respond to emergencies has failed to distribute supplies and, in some provinces, money to transport it has gone missing," said the report. "Elsewhere, warehouses have been emptied without Kabul's knowledge." One U.N. Official described the Ministry of Refugees and Repatriation as a "black hole."

A 2014 Pentagon study said that "corruption directly threatens the viability and legitimacy of the Afghan state," because it "alienates key elements of the population, discredits the government and security forces, undermines international support, subverts state functions and rule of law, robs the state of revenue and creates barriers to economic growth." Corruption impacts the Afghan economy, national security, police ineffectiveness, and public faith in government institutions.

In a March 2015 article, Mary Beth Goodman and Trevor Sutton described corruption as the second most important threat to Afghanistan's "long-term security and economic development," the foremost threat being "the Taliban insurgency in the country's South and East." These two threats, they explained, are connected, government graft having caused "deep frustration with the Western-backed regime in Kabul and undermined the integrity of the Afghan administration." Also, corruption has severely debilitated the nation's military and police and interrupted the supply of government services, foreign aid, and investment to those who need it, thus fueling the insurgency.

"Throughout the past 13 years," wrote Haroun Mir on June 24, 2015, "high levels of corruption and bad governance have seriously thwarted the international community's efforts to stabilize Afghanistan. Millions of dollars that were allocated for the reconstruction and development of Afghanistan were misused or wasted." Mir cited in particular "the disappearance of $1 billion in the 2010 Kabul Bank scandal, in which a cohort of unscrupulous businessmen and politicians carried out a Ponzi scheme in the largest private Afghan bank."

=== Afghan anti-corruption organizations ===
The Afghan government formed the High Office for Oversight and Anti-Corruption (HOOAC). One source notes, however, that "in reality, the Afghans that currently run the country do not want to see the pipeline of money that flows from the donor nations to their Swiss or Dubai bank accounts interrupted. So this 'high office' really is not doing much to fix the corrupt situation in Kabul."

Although the HOOAC purportedly has three basic functions, namely "prevention, investigation and enforcement," it has no legal authority to perform investigations. Individual governmental departments are supposed to refer corruption cases to the Attorney General's Office (AGO) for investigation, whereupon the HOOAC is supposed to engage in follow-up work. One challenge to its work is that "only 9% of Afghan homes own a computer and only one third of citizens understand basic governmental administrative procedures, making reporting bribes exceptionally difficult." The HOOAC "lacks the requisite infrastructure to properly process the current levels of complaints. A study found that it "was greatly understaffed, lacked experienced employees, suffered from in inadequate operational capacity and failed to meet international standards of independence from the rest of government as an oversight institution." Because of the corruption of the judiciary itself, many corruption cases are not properly adjudicated.

Other local initiatives are Management Systems International (MSI) and Integrity Watch Afghanistan (IWA), a civil society organization. Former president Karzai appointed a childhood friend, Izzatullah Wassifif, as head of the Afghan anti-corruption agency. In 2007 it was revealed that he had spent 3½ years in a U.S. prison for drug trafficking. "Almost no one is more corrupt than President Karzai," states one source. "Although he will make passionate speeches about how corruption needs to be eliminated he continues to be the most corrupt official in Afghanistan. In addition, he condemns U.S. efforts to reduce corruption as an attempt to meddle in Afghan sovereign affairs. On the rare occasion that an Afghan official does try to fight corruption he will find himself quickly dismissed."

== Anti-corruption efforts ==
There have been many anti-corruption initiatives in Afghanistan, but the level of success has been uneven and unremarkable. Efforts have been made, for instance, to improve budget transparency. Formerly, the Ministry of Finance drafted the budget on its own; that is no longer the case, but more local involvement is necessary.

In 2008, Afghanistan ratified the U.N. Convention against Corruption, and Karzai established the High Office for Oversight and Anti-Corruption, or HOO.

According to a UN report, Afghanistan "made some tangible progress in reducing the level of corruption in the public sector" between 2009 and 2012. In 2009, 59% had to pay at least one bribe to a public official; in 2012, that figure had dropped to 50%. Bribes to police officers dropped from 52% to 42% during the same period. At the same time, however, the frequency of bribery climbed from 4.7 to 5.6 bribes per bribe-payer and the average bribe rose from US$158 to US$214.

August 2011 reports stated that the U.S. military, after spending a year investigating trucking contracts, had "moved to stem the flow of contract money to Afghan insurgents, awarding at least 20 companies new contracts worth about $1 billion for military supply transport and suspending seven current contractors it found lacking in 'integrity and business ethics.'" A senior military officer said, "I think we've finally got our arms around this thing." Rep. John F. Tierney of the House Oversight and Government Reform subcommittee expressed concern that the contracts lacked transparency and accountability ensuring any U.S. dollars are not being syphoned to corrupt officials, insurgents, the Taliban, drug traffickers, or anyone else considered the enemy. This alleged progress was purportedly the work of the Combined Joint Interagency Task Force Shafafiyat, created by Gen. David Petraeus and headed by Brig. Gen. H. R. McMaster.

A 2013 SIGAR report accused Afghanistan's Attorney General's Office of lacking "the political will to prosecute high-level, corrupt officials" and said that an "atmosphere of paranoia prevails" in the country. The report cited prosecutors' slowness to deal with the Kabul Bank scandal.

=== Firing of Faqiryar ===
In a 2010 article in The New York Times, in which he referred to Afghanistan as "Corrupt-istan," Dexter Filkins cited the case of Fazel Ahmad Faqiryar, who had been fired as deputy attorney general for attempting to prosecute senior members of Karzai's cabinet. Faqiryar criticized the Afghan legal system by stating that the laws of the country are meant only for the lower classes. Filkins described Faqiryar's ouster as exemplary of the lawlessness and lack of any rule of law that permeates Karzai's government, and the rest of Afghanistan's regional governments. Filkins quoted Afghan criticism of the US for working with Afghan officials known to be corrupt, and said that US commanders fear "that taking down the biggest Afghan politicians could open a vacuum of authority ... that the Taliban could take advantage of." Filkins also noted that the firing of Faqiryar had made him a respected national icon.

=== Yaffali case ===
In December 2011, Karzai demanded that the occupying coalition provide evidence against the Afghan Army's former surgeon general, Gen. Ahmad Zia Yaftali, whom it wanted to prosecute. NATO had in fact provided evidence a year earlier that Yaftali had stolen medical drugs from Afghanistan's largest military hospital, which he was in charge of, totaling in the millions of dollars. It was noted that Afghan soldiers regularly died from minor infections at the hospital due to a lack of medicine, and their inability to pay bribes to the hospital's medical staff. Brig. Gen. McMaster, who ran the US inquiry, was outraged at Karzai's move, the Yaftali investigation having been a major part of the anti-corruption effort. "Now it appeared as if an officer who was accused of letting his own soldiers die so he could enrich himself would never be tried."

=== Fighting corruption under Ghani ===
Both President Ashraf Ghani and Chief Executive Abdullah Abdullah, who took office in 2014, "made anticorruption efforts a key component of their presidential campaigns."

In December 2014, Afghan President Ashraf Ghani dismissed the heads of the attorney's office, the oil, power, and customs departments and the director of education in Herat province. Ghani said that all of the officials except the chief attorney would be charged with corruption. These were the first major changes Ghani had made in a local administration since assuming power.

When a scheme by local contractors to overcharge the Afghan government and U.S. taxpayers was revealed in January 2015, President Ghani fired the contractors without hesitation, voided the contract and launched an investigation. This was described as "a total 180-degree turn from the way it was under Karzai."

In December 2014, Transparency International offered six recommendations to combat Afghan corruption. They included: Promote clean leadership in key institutions; Make the judiciary independent; Establish a best practice right to information regime; Establish an independent anti-corruption agency; Make asset declaration mandatory for all those who hold power; and Procurement transparency.

"Until now," wrote Haroun Mir in 2015, "the Afghan government and the donor community have tried hard to curb corruption in the public sector. However, while politicians and public sector officials often benefit from corruption, the main perpetrator is the private sector that bribes them." In Afghanistan, "corruption at its highest level takes place because of collusion between political appointees and contractors from the business sector."

=== U.S. anti-corruption efforts ===
Task Force Shafafiyat (or Task Force Transparency), more officially known as Combined Joint Inter-Agency Task Force – Shafafiyat, was established by General Petreaus to combat corruption.

The Anti-Corruption Coordination Group was set up by the U.S. Embassy to develop strategies for reducing corruption.

In 2010, Petreaus founded Task Force 2010 "to try to follow the money trail in an effort to ensure that money is spent properly. " It later relocated from Afghanistan to a Qatar air base.

The Special Investigator General for Afghanistan Reconstruction (SIGAR) "is supposed to conduct audits of reconstruction projects and attempt to recover any US taxpayer funds." Originally ineffective, owing to "shoddy record keeping and poorly maintained databases," it has since improved in efficiency, becoming "a true 'watchdog'" that provides excellent reports.

The International Contract Corruption Task Force (ICCTF) is an interagency organization formed in 2006 with the help of the FBI to help battle the "immense" level of crime among U.S. contracting officials. Its members include the FBI, DCIS, SIGAR, MPFU, NCIS, and the IG offices of State and USAID.

The Afghanistan Threat Finance Cell (ATFC), founded in 2009, combats illicit financial networks and provides other US agencies with financial expertise and intelligence.

A July 2012 report on NPR stated that while "U.S. officials consider widespread corruption one of the main barriers to a stable Afghanistan," Seth Jones, a former advisor to the U.S. command in Afghanistan, stated that "when it came to specific, concrete, sustained efforts to target and reduce corruption within the Afghan government," U.S. officials did not have the necessary resolve.

In March 2015, Mary Beth Goodman and Trevor Sutton called on the U.S. to help Afghanistan increase accountability and transparency and lower corruption and graft. While eliminating corruption in Afghanistan is no simple task, Goodman and Sutton stated in March 2015 "it could be significantly reduced, and even modest improvements in public accountability will substantially enhance the legitimacy of the new government."

=== SIGAR reports ===
John Sopko, the special inspector general for Afghanistan reconstruction, said in 2013 that US government bureaucrats had ordered him to cease from publishing damning audits that noted a myriad of corruption cases in Afghanistan, preferring instead to keep them guarded from the public.

The Washington Times reported in September 2013 that a U.S. government public-health program in Afghanistan might have wasted $190 million owing to a "high risk of waste, fraud and abuse," and that the U.S. Agency for International Development (USAID) was still providing "millions of U.S. taxpayer dollars in direct assistance with little assurance" that those funds were being spent properly. The Times cited a SIGAR report stating that "USAID has ignored repeated warnings about waste" at the Afghan Ministry of Public Health.

In May 2014, John Sopko, the special inspector general for Afghanistan reconstruction (SIGAR), told a meeting at the Middle East Institute that corruption was the "big issue" in Afghanistan and that the US wasn't doing enough to combat it. He said commanders in the field had told him "corruption is more serious in Afghanistan than the insurgency" and explained that "the patronage system and the failure to prosecute people guilty of gross fraud and abuse is undermining the Afghan economy and putting future development efforts at risk."

=== Second Taliban Era ===
Following their return to power, the Taliban have significantly tackled corruption. Afghanistan is placed as 150th among the 180 countries of the corruption watchdog Transparency International's 2022 Corruption Perceptions Index, where the country ranked first is perceived to be the least corrupt and the country ranked 180, the most corrupt. This is a massive upgrade from Afghanistan's former position at 180th in 2011, and 174th in 2021. In 2011, the country ranked next to Somalia, and North Korea. The Taliban have also reportedly reduced bribery and extortion in public service areas.

== Specific cases ==
=== Kabul Bank ===
The Kabul Bank, established in 2004 by Khalilullah Ferozi and Sherkhan Farnood, was Afghanistan's first private bank. From the beginning, it was criticized as resembling a Ponzi scheme. It lent money to the nation's elite, who did not repay the loans. In an editorial The Guardian accused Ferozi of causing the most damage to Afghanistan besides the Taliban.

Ferozi and Farnood curried favor with President Karzai's family, whereupon the Afghan government put Kabul Bank in charge of the payroll accounts for all of the nation's civil servants, soldiers, and police officers. One of Karzai's brothers, Mahmoud Karzai, became the bank's third-biggest shareholder. The bank put $4 million into Karzai's 2009 re-election campaign, and in return got 430,000 government accounts.

According to The Guardian, Ferozi and Farnood drained "the savings of thousands of depositors totalling $579m (£359m) in a binge of insider lending by the bank's politically powerful shareholders. Because there was never any obligation to pay any interest on these 'loans', the total unaccounted sum is $910m. In a country where GDP is just $12bn, that is an extraordinary figure." The scandal destroyed confidence in the public banking system, and dried up many foreign-aid payments.

The amount spent by the government to bail out the bank totaled between 5% and 6% of Afghanistan's entire GDP.

In November 2015, it was reported that Ferozi, who was supposed to be serving a term in Pul-i-Charkhi prison for his role in defrauding the Kabul Bank of nearly $1 billion, had signed a new contract with the Afghan government for a massive real-estate development in Kabul called Smart City. He was now serving his sentence at night, reflecting an apparent unwillingness on the part of the Afghan government to address corruption at the highest level. International donors and the International Monetary Fund had made Ferozi's prosecution a mandatory condition for further aid to Afghanistan.

One Western official stated that the prison arrangement with Ferozi and the government's new business involvement with him sent a message that embezzlement on a grand enough scale will result in no incarceration. Yama Torabi, a member of Afghanistan's anti-corruption committee, said that these developments perpetuated a culture of kleptocracy and signaled that any official can loot the Afghan budget, while anyone can invest with no questions asked.

=== Raheen case ===
A 2013 report by the Daily Beast stated that Mahkdoom Raheen, formerly a democracy-supporting professor who became Minister of Information and Culture under Karzai, a close friend, had engaged in massive corruption. After Indian philanthropist Madanjeet Singh donated $1 million to rehabilitate Kabul's Cultural Heritage Center and train art preservationists, Raheen embezzled nearly all of Singh's donation, depositing it in a personal account that was not discovered until after Raheen's 2006 resignation from the ministry after allegations of "corruption, nepotism, mismanagement, and promoting Iranian cultural interests in Afghanistan." Despite the allegations, Karzai named Raheen ambassador to India. Observers criticized the comfort leaders hold for corruption culture within the government. After Karzai's 2009 re-election, Raheen was once again named Minister of Information and Culture. A former senior culture ministry official, Zia Bumia, questioned how grand corruption is by ministers connected to warlords and drug lords when an academic is embezzling funds. In 2013, he was charged with involvement in illegally appropriating at least 59 cultural and historical artifacts but told the Daily Beast that he had been cleared of the charge. He was also accused of helping Ahmad Shah Sultani, a reputed art trafficker, found a Kabul museum that is suspected of being a front for illegally acquired cultural artifacts to traffic on the black market, at the benefit of Sultani and Raheen.

=== Zakhilwal case ===
It was reported in August 2012 that Finance Minister Hazarat Omar Zakhilwal, who had been lauded for his integrity, had embezzled over $1 million and deposited it in Canadian bank accounts. Afghanistan's High Office of Oversight and Anti-corruption chief, Dr. Azizullah Ludin, said he would investigate.

In May 2013, the Daily Beast reported on a session of the Afghan Parliament at which Zakhilwal, who was being impeached for corruption, charged several M.P.s with corruption. Haji Zaher Qadeer was accused of smuggling $269 million worth of flour from Pakistan; Haji Hamid Lalai had sought official processing for almost 2000 illegal vehicles; other M.P.s were charged with smuggling oil tankers and alcohol, with pressuring Zakhilwal to hire their relatives as customs officials, and with exercising undue influence on supply contracts. In the end, Zakhilwal kept his position. The story noted that international aid and military organizations encourage corruption by giving contracts to businesses illegally owned by MPs.

=== Kos resignation ===
In October 2015, Drago Kos, Afghanistan's chief international corruption watchdog, resigned, complaining that the government's corruption efforts were not serious. "With the exception of some sporadic activities, in one year since the new president and the C.E.O. took positions, I could not see any systemic action against endemic corruption in the country," said Kos, a member of the Independent Joint Anti-Corruption Monitoring and Evaluation Committee. Kos stated that there was never any political support at any point in his efforts and cited a lack of will to combat corruption.

=== Kam Air ===
On January 30, 2013, The New York Times reported that a move by the US military to blacklist an Afghan airline, Kam Air, because of accusations of drug smuggling had caused diplomatic pressure with a Karzai spokesman, Aimal Faizi, demanding evidence of guilt.

=== Ghost soldiers ===
Transcluded from Ghost soldiers

In 2016, at least 40% of names on the Afghan National Army roster in Helmand Province were nonexistent. A 2016 report by the Special Inspector General for Afghanistan Reconstruction (SIGAR) said, "neither the United States nor its Afghan allies know how many Afghan soldiers and police actually exist, how many are in fact available for duty, or, by extension, the true nature of their operational capabilities". In early 2019, at least 42,000 ghost soldiers were removed from the Afghan National Army's payroll.

Until shortly before the August 15, 2021 takeover by the Taliban, the Afghan Armed Forces were, on paper, 300,000 strong and built over the previous two decades by U.S. and NATO efforts. Over the course of just weeks, it was routed by a much smaller Taliban force, with most provincial capitals falling with little or no resistance.

== See also ==
- Afghanistan Papers
- Integrity Watch Afghanistan
- International Anti-Corruption Academy
- Group of States Against Corruption
- International Anti-Corruption Day
- ISO 37001 Anti-bribery management systems
- United Nations Convention against Corruption
- OECD Anti-Bribery Convention
- Transparency International
