= Afghan afghani =

Currency of Afghanistan

Afghani
افغانۍ (Pashto); افغانی (Dari)
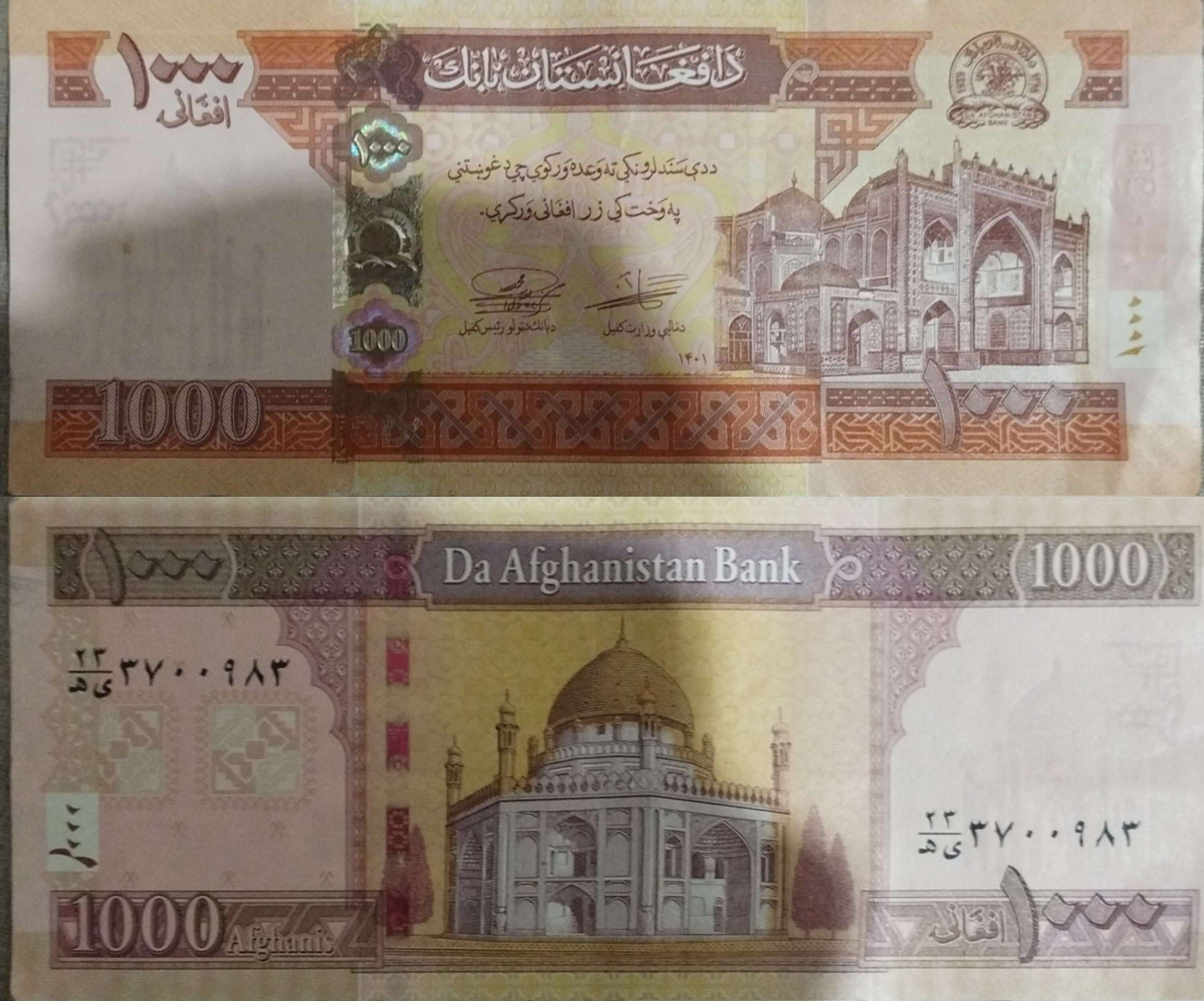
- A 1,000 ؋ Afghanistan banknote with the main design on the front depicting the Mausoleum of Imam Ali and the main design on the back depicting the Mausoleum of Ahmad Shah Durrani.

ISO 4217
- Code: AFN (numeric: 971) before 2003: AFA
- Subunit: 0.01

Units of account
- Symbol: ؋ ( ) or Af (singular) and Afs (plural)
- Subunit
- 1/100: pul

Denominations
- Banknotes: Afs. 10, Afs. 20, Afs. 50, Afs. 100, Afs. 500 and Afs. 1,000
- Coins: Af. 1, Afs. 2 and Afs. 5

Demographics
- Date of introduction: 1923
- Replaced: Afghan rupee
- User(s): Afghanistan

Issuance
- Central bank: Central Bank of Afghanistan
- Website: www.dab.gov.af
- Printer: Polish Security Printing Works; Oberthur Fiduciaire
- Website: www.pwpw.pl www.oberthur-fiduciaire.com

Valuation
- Inflation: -1.75% (2024 est.)
- Source: Da Afghanistan Bank; The World Factbook

The afghani (sign: ؋ or Af (plural: Afs) code: AFN; Pashto: افغانۍ [ʔɐvɣɑˈnəɪ]; Dari: افغانی [ʔɐvɣɑːˈniː]) is the official currency of Afghanistan, a status it has held since the 1920s. It is nominally subdivided into 100 puls (پول), although there are no pul coins in circulation as of 2026. Printed in Poland, the afghani currency is managed solely by the Central Bank of Afghanistan.

The afghani was introduced in 1923 but is still informally referred to as a rupee by some in conversation and transactions, a legacy of its predecessing Afghan rupee currency. Its current exchange rate is around 65 afghanis for 1 United States dollar.

== History ==
=== First Afghani (1923–2002) ===
5 Afghan afghani (1961/62)
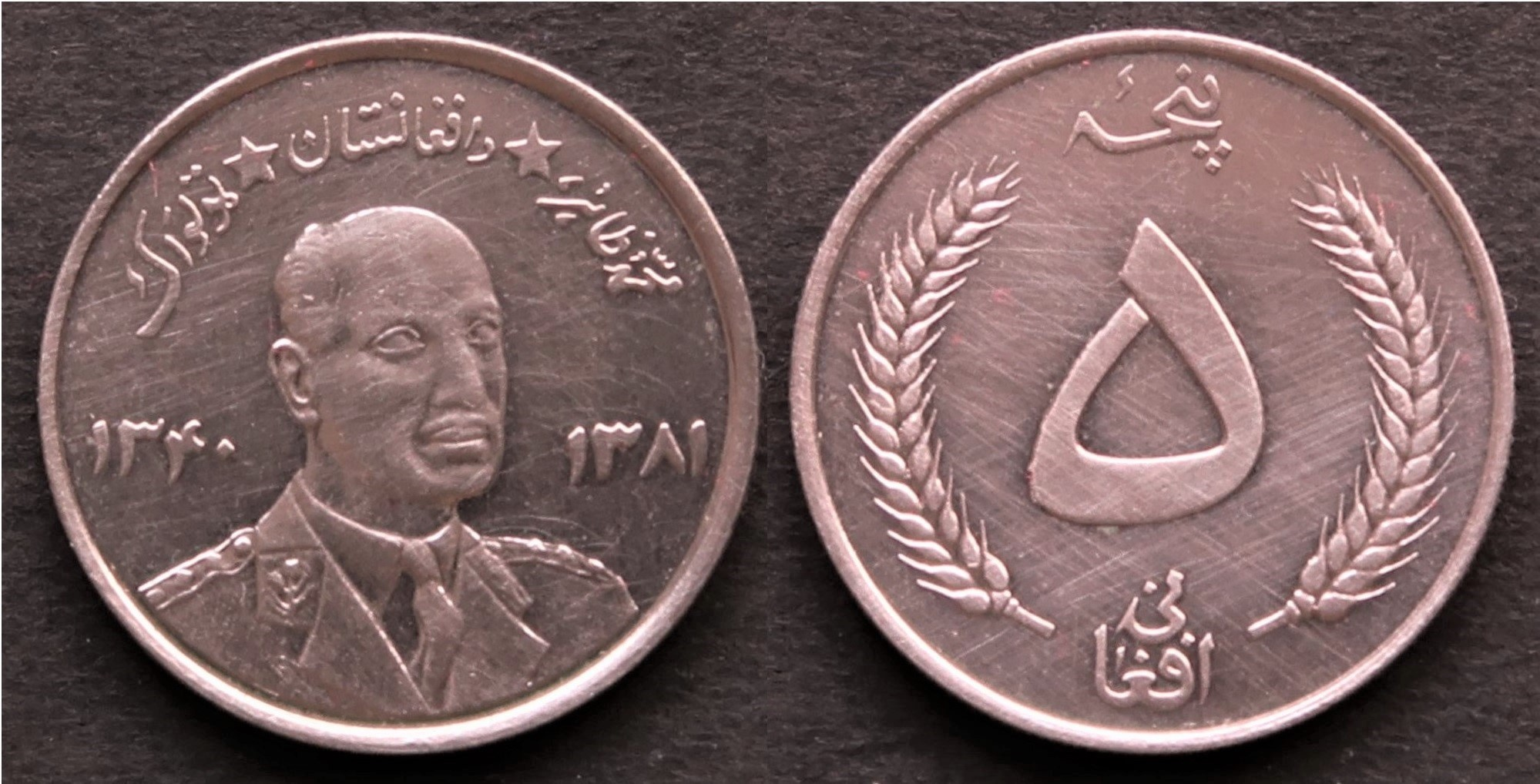
First side of the image: Obverse: Portrait of Mohammad Zahir Shah with lettering "* محمد ظاهر * دافغانستان" (Mohammad Zahir Afghanistan) on top and "۱۳۴۰-۱۳۸۱" (1381 - 1340).
Second side of the image: Reverse: Wheat ear flank on the side and denomination in the centre. Lettering "پنج" (five), "۵" (5) and "افغانی" (Afghanis).
Afghani coin from the reign of Zahir Shah, who was king of Afghanistan from 1933 to 1973. This coin was minted in c. 1962, corresponding to Lunar Hijri year 1381 and Solar Hijri year 1340.
5 afghani (c. 1973)
[[|250px]]
First side of the image: Obverse: Emblem of Afghanistan (1974 to 1978 version) surrounded by lettering "د افغانستان جمهوريت" (The Republic of Afghanistan) and "د چنګاښ ۱۳٥۲-۲٦" (Cancer 26th 1352).
Second side of the image: Reverse: Denomination surrounded by grain sprig wreath. Lettering "پنجه" (Five), "۵" (5) and "افغانی" (Afghanis).
The date on this coin refers to the republican revolution of 1973, corresponding to Solar Hijri year 1352

The original afghani (ISO 4217 code: AFA) was introduced in 1923 during the era of King Amanullah Khan, replacing the Afghan rupee that was used since 1891. In addition to being subdivided into 100 puls, 20 afghanis were equal to one amani. The rate of conversion from the rupee is sometimes quoted as 1 afghani = 1 rupee 6 paisas, based on the silver contents of the last rupee coins and the first afghani coins. The afghani initially contained 9 grams of silver. Alongside the new currency, the various units of weight used in Afghanistan were replaced by a single metric system.

Except during World War I, Afghanistan's foreign exchange rate has been freely determined by market forces. However, for some periods, a dual exchange rate regime existed in Afghanistan: an official exchange rate which was fixed by the major banks in the country, and a free market exchange rate which was determined by the supply and demand forces in Kabul's money bazaar called Saraye Shahzada. For example, in order to avoid the seasonal fluctuations in the exchange rate, a fixed exchange rate was adopted in 1935 by the Bank-e-Millie (National Bank), which was then responsible for the country's exchange rate system and official reserves. Bank-e-Millie agreed to exchange afghani at Afs. 4 against 1 Indian rupee in 1935. After the establishment of Da Afghanistan Bank (DAB) as the central bank of Afghanistan, such a preferential official fixed exchange rate continued to be practiced. Although DAB tried to keep its official rate close to the Sarai Shahzada exchange rate, the gap between the official and free-market exchange rates widened in the 1980s and during the civil war thereafter.

The afghani traded at Afs. 67 to one US dollar in 1973. After the start of a civil war in 1992, the same US dollar bought Afs. 16,000. Banknotes from the period of Zahir Shah's monarchy ceased to be legal tender by 1991. After the creation of a dysfunctional government and the start of the civil war, different warlords and factions, foreign powers and forgers each made their own afghani banknotes to support themselves financially, with no regard to standardization or honoring serial numbers.

In December 1996, shortly after the Taliban took control of Afghanistan's institutions, Ehsanullah Ehsan, the chairman of the Taliban's Central Bank, declared most afghani notes in circulation to be worthless (approximately 100 trillion Afghani) and cancelled the contract with the Russian firm that had been printing the currency since 1992. Ehsan accused the firm of sending new shipments of afghani notes to ousted President Burhanuddin Rabbani in northern Takhar province. The exchange rate at the time of Ehsan's announcement was Afs. 21,000 to one US dollar. It was then devalued to Afs. 43,000 to the dollar. Abdul Rashid Dostum, who militarily controlled Jowzjan Province and nearby Uzbek villages, also printed his own money for a short time.

During late 2001 and early 2002, the currency became highly destabilized. The afghani traded at Afs. 73,000 per US$1 in September 2001, steeply soaring to Afs. 23,000 after the Taliban was replaced by a new government under Hamid Karzai in December 2001, before plunging again to Afs. 36,000 in January 2002. Around seven different versions of the currency were in circulation by that time. A former governor said at the time that maybe "trillions" of banknotes are in circulation as a result.

=== Second Afghani (2002–present) ===
In 2002, the afghani was redenominated, and it received a new ISO 4217 code AFN. No subdivisions were issued. It replaced the previous afghani at two distinct rates: issues of the government of former President Rabbani (de jure 1992–2001) were replaced at a rate of 1,000 to the new afghani, while the issues of Dostum (1992–1997 in northern Afghanistan) were replaced at a rate of 2,000 to the new afghani. It was created in an effort to stabilize the economy and stop the rapid inflation. The notes were printed in Germany.

The new currency was announced by President Karzai on 4 September 2002, and introduced to the market on October 8, 2002. This monetary reform was well received by the public as it was a sign of security and stability, especially the country's rebuilding effort. People also no longer had to carry many bags of money to buy ordinary things. It was the first time in many years that a sole currency was under the control of the central bank instead of warlords. Most old banknotes were destroyed by the end of 2002.

Da Afghanistan Bank has adopted a floating exchange rate regime and let the exchange rate be determined freely by market forces. The new afghani was valued at Afs. 43 to one US dollar.

After depreciating during the last quarter of 2003/04, the afghani appreciated steadily, gaining 8 per cent against the US dollar between March 2004 and July 2004. This appreciation, at a time of increasing inflation, appeared to reflect a greater willingness by the population to use the afghani as a medium of exchange and as a store of value. This trend appeared to be attributable to the relative stability of the exchange rate since the introduction of the new currency, administrative measures aimed at promoting its use, such as the requirement that shopkeepers must price goods in afghani. Donors were increasingly making payments in afghanis instead of US dollars and this appeared to be widely accepted. By 2009, the afghani was valued at Afs. 45 per one US dollar. In 2019, the afghani reached Afs. 75 to the US dollar.

After the 2021 re-establishment of the Islamic Emirate of Afghanistan, the nation's foreign assets were frozen. IMF blocked the release of $450 million in August. Subsequently, the value of the afghani fell. The Islamic Emirate has banned all foreign currencies to encourage use of the afghani as national tender. In the third quarter of 2023, the afghani rose to be the best performing currency in the world, climbing over 9% against the US dollar.

== Coinage ==
In 1952, aluminium 25 pul and nickel-clad steel 50 pul were introduced, followed by aluminium Afs. 2 and Afs. 5 in 1958. In 1961 nickel-clad steel Af. 1, Afs. 2 and Afs. 5 were minted; the Af. 1 and Afs. 2 coins show years of SH 1340 and the Afs. 5 coin shows the year AH 1381.

On 11 April 2005, coins were introduced in denominations of Af. 1, Afs. 2 and Afs. 5.

Coins of the Afghani
Obverse	Reverse	Value	Technical parameters			Description		
Obverse	Reverse	Value	Diameter	Mass	Composition	Edge	Obverse	Reverse
		Af. 1 (1961)	23 mm	4.0 g	Nickel clad steel	Reeded	Wheat, country name and year. Lettering "افغانستان" (Afghanistan), "١٣٤٠" (Year 1340 as per Afghan calendar i.e. 1961 A.D).	Denomination surrounded with star at periphery. Lettering "یوة ١ افغاني" (One Afghani).
		Af. 1	20 mm	3.25 g	Copper-plated steel	Smooth	Coat of arms of Afghanistan	Denomination and year
		Afs. 2	22 mm	4.1 g	Stainless Steel	Smooth	Coat of arms of Afghanistan	Denomination and year
		Afs. 5	24 mm	5.08 g	Brass	Reeded	Coat of arms of Afghanistan	Denomination and year

== Banknotes ==
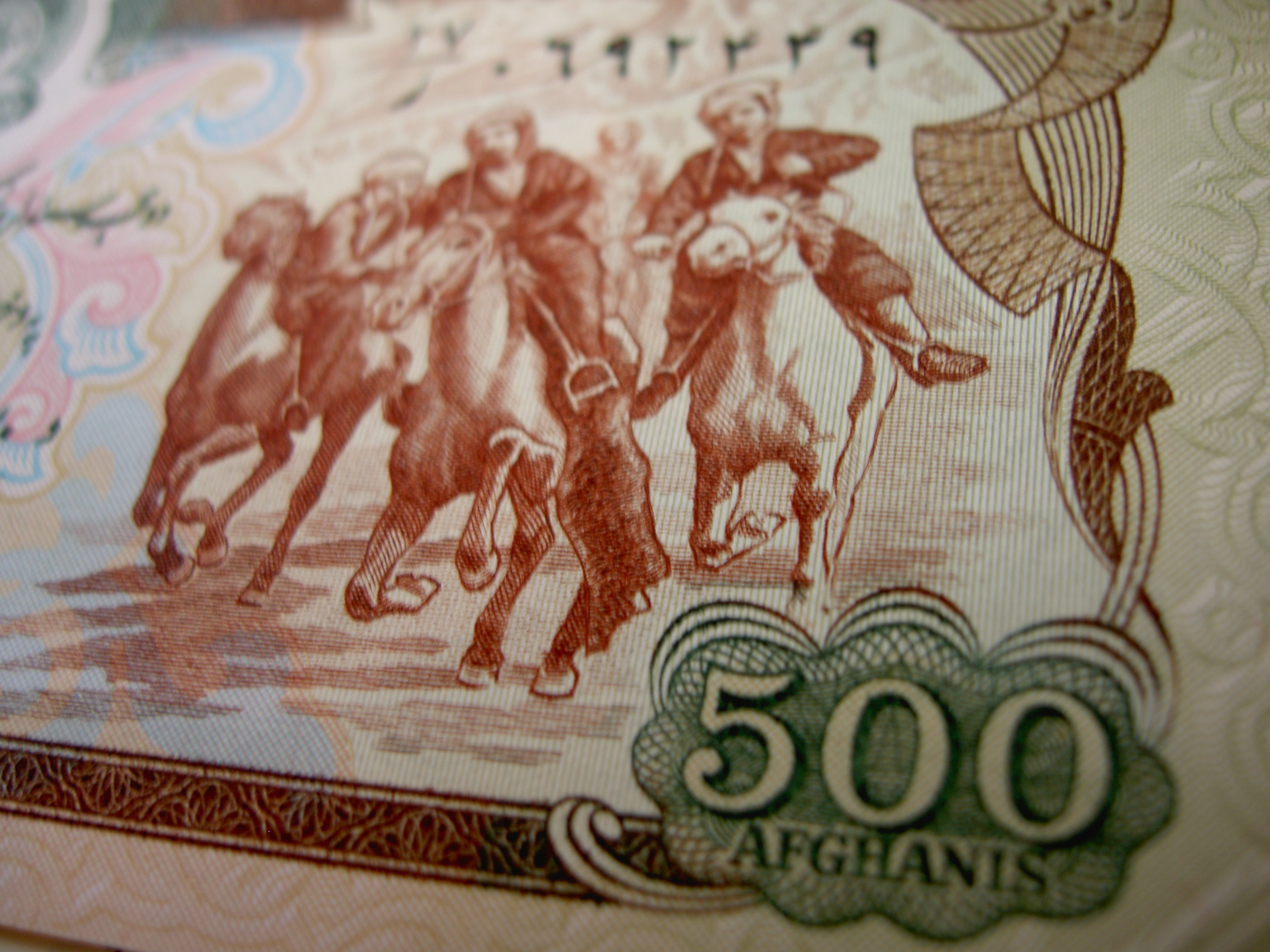
Closeup of an Afs. 500 note issued in 1990, featuring a game of Buzkashi

Between 1925 and 1928, Treasury notes were introduced in denominations of Afs. 5, Afs. 10 and Afs. 50. In 1936, Afs. 2, Afs. 20 and Afs. 100 notes were added. The Bank of Afghanistan (Da Afghanistan Bank) took over paper money production in 1939, issuing notes for Afs. 2, Afs. 5, Afs. 10, Afs. 20, Afs. 50, Afs. 100, Afs. 500 and Afs. 1,000. The Afs. 2 and Afs. 5 notes were replaced by coins in 1958. In 1993, Afs. 5,000 and Afs. 10,000 notes were introduced.

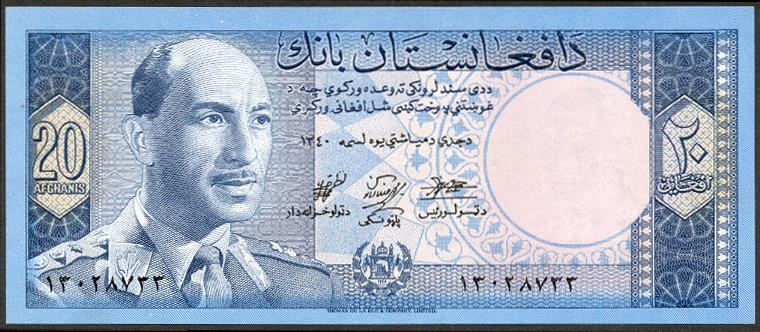
Afs. 20 banknote during the monarchy, front (1963)

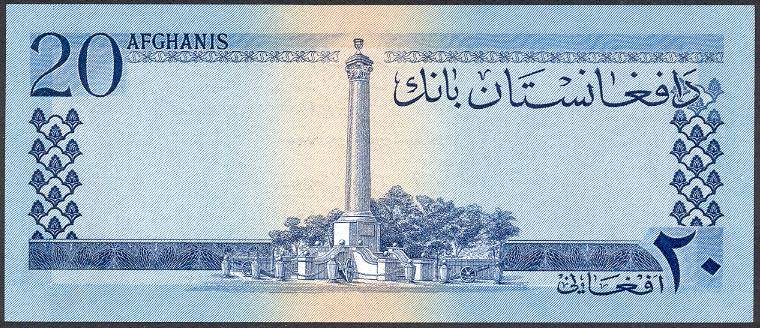
Afs. 20 banknote during the monarchy, back (1963)

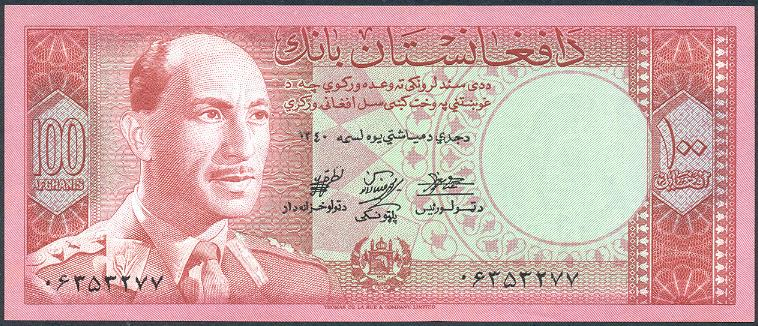
Afs. 100 banknote during the monarchy, front (1963)

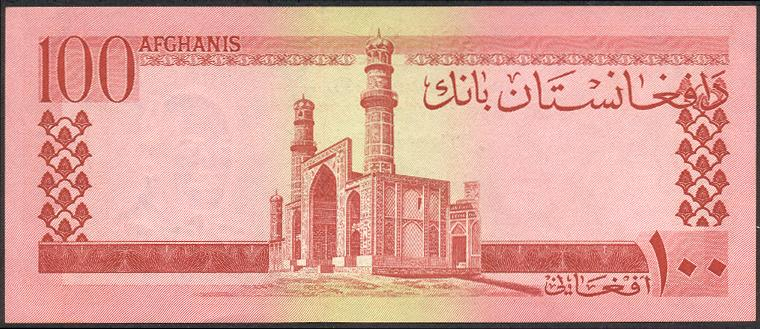
Afs. 100 banknote during the monarchy, back (1963)

"A 'pothole cave' or 'mouth of a shaft' (or Pit cave) is said to be visible on the Afs. 10,000 banknote from 1993 as a limited dark area in the hillside above the ancient 'pol' or gateway at the ruins near Lashkar Gah. This is possibly the entrance to one of the man-made undergrounds at Qala-e-Bost."

1978 Series
Image		Value	Dimensions	Main Color	Description	
Obverse	Reverse	Value	Dimensions	Main Color	Obverse	Reverse
		Afs. 10	115 × 52 mm	Green	Seal of Da Afghanistan Bank	Salang Pass
		Afs. 20	125 × 56 mm	Orange	Seal of Da Afghanistan Bank	Band-e Amir National Park
		Afs. 50	134 × 58 mm	Turquoise	Seal of Da Afghanistan Bank	Darul Aman Palace
		Afs. 100	142 × 62 mm	Pink	Seal of Da Afghanistan Bank	Dam, hydroelectric power station
		Afs. 500	151 × 66 mm	Purple	Seal of Da Afghanistan Bank, Buzkashi players	Bala Hissar fortress
		Afs. 500	151 × 66 mm	Orange and green	Seal of Da Afghanistan Bank, Buzkashi players	Bala Hissar fortress
		Afs. 1,000	160 × 70 mm	Brown	Seal of Da Afghanistan Bank, Mausoleum of Imam Ali	Taq-e Zafar and Lion Gate
		Afs. 5,000	165 × 74 mm	Purple	Seal of Da Afghanistan Bank, Pul-e Khishti Mosque	Tomb of Ahmad Shah Durrani
		Afs. 10,000	170 × 77 mm	Turquoise	Seal of Da Afghanistan Bank, Great Mosque of Herat	Qala-e-Bost

On 7 October 2002, banknotes were introduced in denominations of Af. 1, Afs. 2, Afs. 5, Afs. 10, Afs. 20, Afs. 50, Afs. 100, Afs. 500, and Afs. 1,000. The Af. 1, Afs. 2 and Afs. 5 notes were replaced by coins in 2005. In 2004 and 2008, the security features on several denominations were improved. In 2014 a new Afs. 1,000 note was introduced to prevent counterfeit notes.

2002 Series
Image		Value	Dimensions	Main Color	Description	
Obverse	Reverse	Value	Dimensions	Main Color	Obverse	Reverse
		Af. 1	131 × 55 mm	Pink	Seal of Da Afghanistan Bank with Eucratides I-era coin	Mosque in Mazar-i-Sharif
		Afs. 2	131 × 55 mm	Blue	Seal of Da Afghanistan Bank with Eucratides I-era coin	Taq-e Zafar
		Afs. 5	131 × 55 mm	Brown	Seal of Da Afghanistan Bank with Eucratides I-era coin	Bala Hissar fortress
		Afs. 10	136 × 56 mm	Yellow green	Ahmad Shah Durrani mausoleum, Kandahar	Taq-e Zafar and Lion Gate
		Afs. 20	140 × 58 mm	Brown	Mahmud of Ghazni's Tomb	Arg King's Palace
		Afs. 50	144 × 60 mm	Dark green	Shah-Do Shamshira Mosque	Salang Pass
		Afs. 100	148 × 62 mm	Violet	Pul-e Khishti Mosque	Qala-e-Bost
		Afs. 500	152 × 64 mm	Blue	Great Mosque of Herat	Kandahar International Airport tower
		Afs. 1,000	156 × 66 mm	Orange	Mausoleum of Imam Ali, Mazar-i-Sharif	Tomb of Ahmad Shah Durrani

== Exchange rate ==
The Afghani exchange rate vis-à-vis the U.S. dollar since 1950 has been shown in the following table:

Afghani exchange rate (LCU in USD)
Date	Free-market exchange rate	Official exchange rate
1950	39.0	25.5
1960	40.8	17.7
1970	84.8	39.9
1980	82.5	39.2
1990	150.5	75
1997	11,200	2,500
2001	37,500	3,400
2003	49.0	49.0
2010	45.2	45.2
2015	68	68
2019	75	75
2024	65	65

Current AFN exchange rates
From Google Finance:	AUD CAD CHF CNY EUR GBP HKD JPY USD
From Yahoo! Finance:	AUD CAD CHF CNY EUR GBP HKD JPY USD
From XE.com:	AUD CAD CHF CNY EUR GBP HKD JPY USD
From OANDA:	AUD CAD CHF CNY EUR GBP HKD JPY USD

== See also ==
- Economy of Afghanistan
