= Ajmal Ahmady =

Afghan economist and politician

Ajmal Ahmady اجمل احمدی
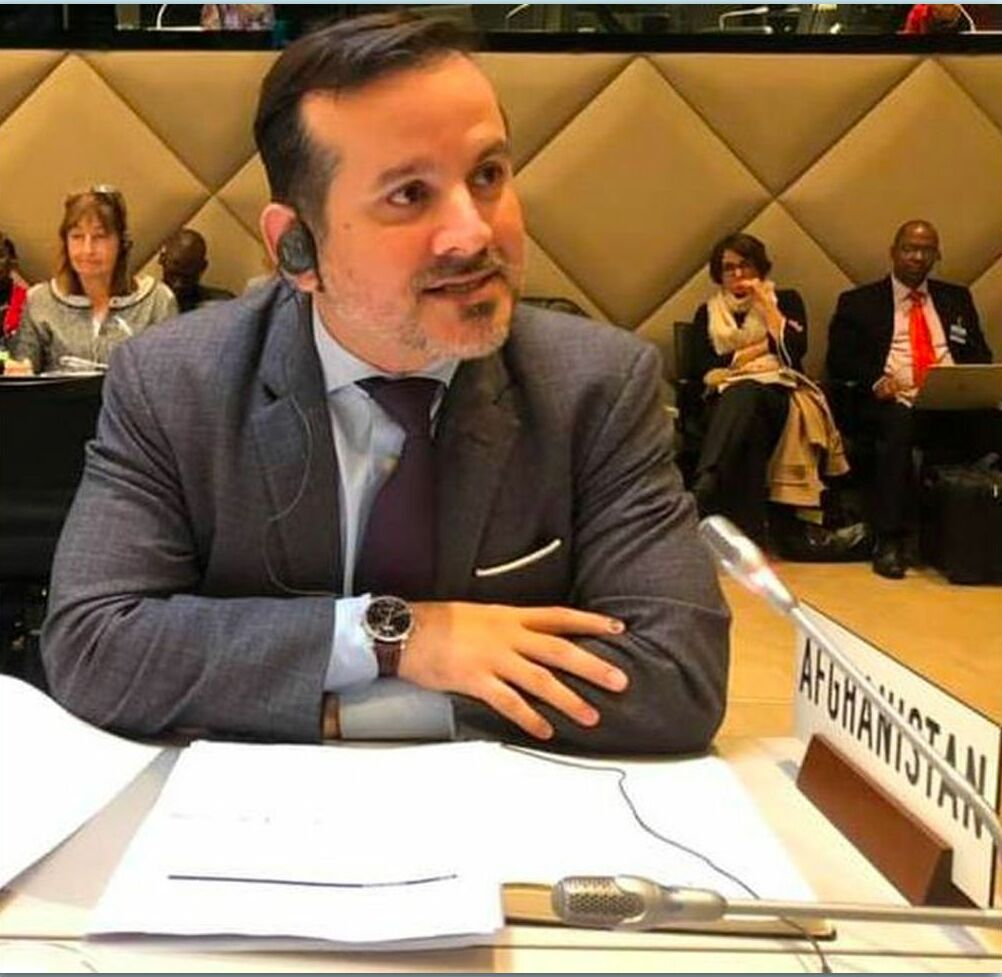
- Ajmal Ahmady

Governor of Da Afghanistan Bank
- In office 3 June 2020 – 15 August 2021
- President: Ashraf Ghani
- Succeeded by: Haji Mohammad Idris (acting)

Minister of Commerce and Industry
- In office 6 February 2019 – 3 June 2020
- President: Ashraf Ghani
- Succeeded by: Nisar Ahmad Ghoryani

Senior Economic Advisor
- In office 30 January 2014 – 6 February 2019
- President: Ashraf Ghani

Personal details
- Born: 18 April 1978 (age 48) Kabul, Afghanistan
- Party: Independent
- Education: Harvard University (MBA, MPA/ID); University of California, Los Angeles (BSc)
- Profession: Economist

Ajmal Ahmady (Persian/Pashto: اجمل احمدی) is an Afghan-American economist and politician who formerly served as the Acting Governor of the Central Bank of Afghanistan, Da Afghanistan Bank, the Acting Minister of Commerce and Industry of Afghanistan, the Senior Economic Advisor to the President of Afghanistan, and represented Afghanistan on the Turkmenistan-Afghanistan-Pakistan-India (TAPI) natural gas pipeline.

He was born in Afghanistan and grew up in the United States. He studied at Harvard University, and worked in the fields of economic development and investment management before returning to Afghanistan in 2014 to work in senior positions within the Afghan government.

== Early life ==
Ajmal Ahmady was born in Kabul during the same week as the Saur Revolution. He spent his childhood in Afghanistan, Pakistan, Germany, and the United States.

His father is from Ghazni Province and is a practicing doctor. His mother is a kindergarten teacher. His brother received a master's degree in finance from Oxford University.

== Education ==
Ajmal Ahmady received two master's degree from Harvard University. He received a Master in Business Administration (MBA) from Harvard Business School and a Master of Public Administration in International Development (MPA/ID) from the Harvard Kennedy School. For his masters thesis, he applied the Growth Diagnostic Framework to Afghanistan under the supervision of economist Dani Rodrik.

He received a Bachelor of Science in Mathematics and Economics with minors in Computer Science and Philosophy from the University of California, Los Angeles.

He is currently a Senior Fellow at the Mossovar-Rahmani Center for Business and Government (M-RCBG) at the Harvard Kennedy School. In this position, he teaches student seminars and conducts research on Central Banking in developing economies, including in monetary policy, payment systems, reserves management, and risk management and AML/CFT compliance.

== Career ==
=== Economic Development and Asset Management ===
Ahmady has had an extensive career at the intersection of economic development, asset management, and policy. He worked as a Microfinance Peace Corps Volunteer in the city of Kumba in Cameroon (2001-2003), the World Bank (2004), as a Senior Advisor at the Afghan Ministry of Finance (2004-2005), the US Treasury Department within the Office of International Monetary Policy researching sovereign debt restructurings (2005), ACAP Partners - an emerging markets private equity group, and Booz Allen Hamilton (2007).

Upon graduating from Harvard University, Ahmady spent eight years in the asset management industry investing in global macro and emerging market strategies. He began as a fixed income corporate bond analyst at T. Rowe Price (2008-2009), became a sovereign CEEMA analyst at Acadian Asset Management (2009-2012), and was the sole global economist and conducted trades at various emerging market funds at Fortress Investment Group (2012-2014).

=== Senior Economic Adviser to the President ===
After the establishment of a National unity government, Ahmady served as the senior advisor for banking and financial affairs to President Ashraf Ghani for four years. In this position, Ahmady worked to improve the business environment, where he led commercial reform efforts, including working with global law firm DLA to make changes to Afghanistan's commercial procedure code, municipal law, insolvency law, limited liabilities law, minerals law, and hydrocarbons law. He also helped coordinate a response to improve Afghanistan's banking sector.

Due to Ahmady's efforts, Afghanistan became the World Bank's largest business reformer in 2018. This included a significant increase in Afghanistan's position in the following categories: protecting minority investors, resolving insolvency, and starting a business.

He contributed to Afghanistan's anti-corruption agenda by drafting the national anti-corruption strategy and followed up with key anti-corruption benchmarks. He represented Afghanistan at the 18th International Anti-Corruption Conference in Copenhagen, where he sat on a panel with then World Bank CEO Kristalina Georgia and other dignitaries.

=== Minister of Commerce and Industry ===
While working as the acting minister of Industry and Commerce of Afghanistan, Ahmady attempted reforms to boost exports, increase industrial production, and improve the business environment.

To improve trade, Ahmady created and was instrumental in leading Afghanistan's National Air Corridor Program that now exports $100 million per year to more than 50 markets around the world and renegotiating a number of transit agreements that should help to reduce transit costs for traders and helped export $1 billion for the first time in the country's history (2020).

To improve industrial capacity, Minister Ahmady restructured the Industrial Parks Directorate, signed trilateral MOUs with our electricity provider DABS and the Chamber of Industry and Mines, and provide greater funding for the development of new industrial parks.

To improve the business environment, Minister Ahmady simplified the business licensing process and lowered the price of a business license from approximately 30,000 afghanis to only 100 afghanis.

=== Governor of Da Afghanistan Bank ===
Based on presidential decree 544 on 3 June 2020, Ahmady was appointed Acting Governor of Da Afghanistan Bank (DAB), the central bank of Afghanistan, which regulates all banking and money handling operations in Afghanistan. His responsibilities included managing monetary policy, financial sector supervision, financial intelligence, payment systems, and banking operations.

Despite challenging circumstances, Governor Ahmady was able to maintain macroeconomic stability, including bringing inflation down from double digits to only 1.6% (as of July 2021), proving strong oversight of the financial sector, and inaugurating a real-time gross settlement (RTGS) system in December 2020. Governor Ahmady launched a successful mobile payments system, and was in the process of nationally launching the program when the Taliban overthrew the government.

He negotiated an IMF Extended Credit Facility (ECF) program and loan of $370 million in November 2021 and led the successful first review of the program in June 2021.

== Departure from Afghanistan ==
Ahmady left Afghanistan on an American military flight on 15 August, as the Islamic Republic collapsed in light of the 2021 Taliban offensive. As he left he posted his final experiences in a tweet that went viral. He criticised government figures Fazel Mahmood Fazly and Hamdullah Mohib for being "too inexperienced in their roles".

== Media Appearances ==
Ahmady has given live interviews, spoken at conferences, written op-eds, interviewed in podcasts, and been featured in numerous media outlets.

His conference appearances include at the Bloomberg New Economy Forum (NEF) where he spoke on a panel with former U.K. Prime Minister Tony Blair and Ian Bremmer, at a Financial Times webinar with General Petraeus, and in India at the Indian Ocean Conference and Global Business Summit.

He has also attended multilateral forums including the IMF 2020 Annual Meetings, the 2018 Geneva Conference on Afghanistan, and the World Bank Seminar on Policy Challenges for the Financial Sector; as well as spoken at numerous think tanks, including describing economic reforms at the Wilson Center (2018), investment opportunities at the Heritage Foundation (2019), and the collapse of the government at the Atlantic Council (2021).

In his Op-Eds, he outlined three internal and three external factors that led to Afghanistan's collapse in Foreign Affairs, has argued for continued engagement in Afghanistan in the Financial Times, has outlined continued challenges that the Taliban would face in Bloomberg, highlighted earlier positive economic reforms in The Hill, and outlined financial sector reforms in Bakhtar News.

In his television and online interviews, he has described Afghanistan's challenges and his escape from the country in CNN, Sky News, BBC, TRT World, G-Zero Media, and WION News.

He has been able to provide greater detail of his time as Acting Governor of DAB in various podcasts, including in Bloomberg Odd Lots, Mercatus Center Macro Musings, and Schroder's 'Running a Central Bank with the Taliban at the Door.' He was able to provide his personal experiences and economic views in NPR's Planet Money and Marketplace.

Ahmady's work and commentary have been referenced around the world in global publications, including the New York Times, Wall Street Journal, Bloomberg, National Interest, CNBC, Axios, Al-Jazeera, Nikkei Asia, Japan Times, Radio Free Europe, Economic Times of India, Asiamoney, TRT World, Les Echos in France, Independent U.K., Khaleej Times, Straits Times of Singapore, Irish Times, Money Control, Turkish Press, and German Press publications.

He has also given briefings to representatives of the U.S. Treasury Department, U.S. State Department, and the Senate Committee on Banking and Finance. Governor Ahmady was referenced in a letter that Portman and Rubio sent to the U.S. Treasury.

== Personal life ==
Ahmady is an Afghan Muslim.
