= Afghan rupee =

Currency of Afghanistan from 1891 to 1923

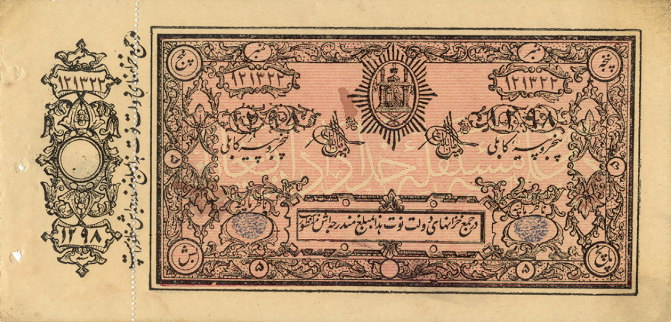
- 5 Afghan rupee banknote (1919)

Unit
- Plural: rupees
- Symbol: Re, Rs

Denominations
- Superunit
- 30: habibi
- 10: tilla
- 10: amani
- Subunit
- 1/60: paisa
- 1/12: shahi
- 1/6: sanar
- 1/3: abbasi
- 1/2: kran, qiran
- Plural
- paisa: paisas
- shahi: shahis
- sanar: sanars
- abbasi: abbasis
- kran, qiran: krans, qirans
- Banknotes: Re. 1/-, Rs. 5/-, Rs. 10/-, Rs. 50/-, Rs. 100/-

Demographics
- Date of introduction: 1891
- Replaced: Kabuli rupee Kandahari rupee
- Date of withdrawal: 1923
- Replaced by: Afghan afghani
- User(s): Afghanistan
- This infobox shows the latest status before this currency was rendered obsolete.

The Afghan rupee was the currency of Afghanistan between 1891 and 1923.

== Local rupees ==
The rupee was put into circulation by Afghan Emperor Ahmad Shah Durrani in 1754. The rupee itself was first issued by Sher Shah Suri during his rule of Sur Empire in the sixteenth century; India and Pakistan still use their variant of the rupee since their independence in 1947.

Before 1891, silver rupees circulated with copper fulus or falus, and gold mohur. The three metals had no fixed exchange rate between them, with different regions issuing their own coins.

== Afghan rupee ==
In 1891, a new currency was introduced, based on the Kabuli rupee and replacing both that and its Kandahari variant.

The rupee was subdivided into 60 paisas, each of 10 dinar. Other denominations issued included the shahi (1/12 rupee or 5 paisas), the sanar (1/6 rupee or 10 paisas), the abbasi (1/3 rupee or 20 paisas), the kran or qiran (1/2 rupee or 30 paisas), the tilla and later the amani (both of 10 rupees), and the habibi (30 rupees).

The Afghan rupee was replaced in 1923 by a new currency called the afghani.

== Banknotes ==
In 1919 following Amanullah Khan's accession to the throne, Treasury notes were introduced for the first time in denominations of 1, 5, 10, 50 and 100 rupees. Text on the note was written in Persian only.

== Coins ==
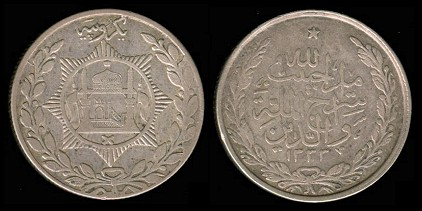
1 rupee coin

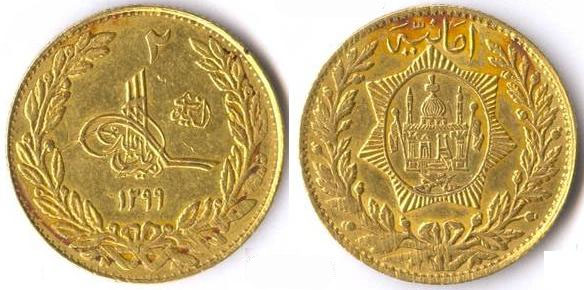
2 amani gold coin (1920)

== See also ==
- Afghan afghani
- Afghan pul
- Economy of Afghanistan
