= Afghanistan Papers =

Internal documents about the US war in Afghanistan

The Afghanistan Papers are a set of interviews relating to the war in Afghanistan undertaken by the United States military prepared by the Special Inspector General for Afghanistan Reconstruction (SIGAR) that was published by The Washington Post in 2019 following a Freedom of Information Act request. The documents reveal that high-ranking officials generally held the opinion that the war was unwinnable while keeping this view hidden from the public. Due to the difficulty of creating objective metrics to demonstrate success, information was manipulated for the duration of the conflict. NPR host Lulu Garcia-Navarro, comparing the documents with the Pentagon Papers, noted the revelation of what constituted "explicit and sustained efforts by the US government to deliberately mislead the public".

== Initial reporting in The Washington Post ==
The initial article derived from these papers, titled "At War With the Truth," was published by Washington Post reporter Craig Whitlock on December 9, 2019. Shortly thereafter, numerous publications built on Whitlock's writing.

In one of the interviews, which were conducted through the agency's Lessons Learned Program, an official estimated that 40% of U.S. aid to Afghanistan since 2001 ended up in the pockets of corrupt officials, warlords, criminals and insurgents. Ryan Crocker, former ambassador to Afghanistan and Iraq, told the investigators in a 2016 interview, "You just cannot put those amounts of money into a very fragile state and society, and not have it fuel corruption."

== Reactions of public officials ==
Due to the nature of the content within the Afghanistan Papers, numerous public officials commented on them in the days following the release of Whitlock's initial article. The following is a sampling of select politicians' comments:

Senator Rand Paul (R–KY): "I think our young men and women that we send to war, our best and our brightest, they deserve better. They deserve an open airing of what is the mission. I've been saying for several years now that I can't meet a general anywhere who can tell me really what is the mission we're trying to accomplish in Afghanistan."

Senator Kirsten Gillibrand (D–NY): "We all read today, the striking reporting by The Washington Post, suggesting that administration officials, potentially including military officials, have misled the American public about the war in Afghanistan. I am writing to request hearings to address these deeply concerning revelations about the Afghan war.”

Representative Tulsi Gabbard (D–HI) said she had introduced legislation for a congressional inquiry into "the lying and wasting of taxpayer dollars" and lives of US service members. She accused the military–industrial complex, contractors and consultancy companies of profiting from "a scam that ripped the US taxpayers off over a trillion dollars since 9/11 in Afghanistan alone." Gabbard reiterated her request to bring US troops home from Afghanistan.

Former vice president (and later president) Joe Biden distanced himself from Barack Obama's Afghan war policy, saying: "I’m the guy from the beginning who argued that it was a big, big mistake to surge forces to Afghanistan."

== Resurfacing in 2021 ==
The Post's reporting proved newly relevant in the aftermath of the Taliban's 2021 summer offensive and subsequent capture of Kabul, rekindling debates about the efficiency of U.S. state-building effort. Sharp contrasts emerged between what U.S. military officials originally planned to do—versus what actually occurred—in Afghanistan. U.S. officials and leaders such as President Joe Biden were heavily criticised for their actions during the withdrawal and the public narrative that was being told throughout August and September 2021.

Craig Whitlock published a book based on his reporting entitled The Afghanistan Papers: A Secret History of the War, by Simon & Schuster.

== See also ==
- Afghan Files (Australia)
- Israeli retaliation leak
- Corruption in Afghanistan
