= Abdul Qadir Fitrat =

Da Afghanistan Bank Governer

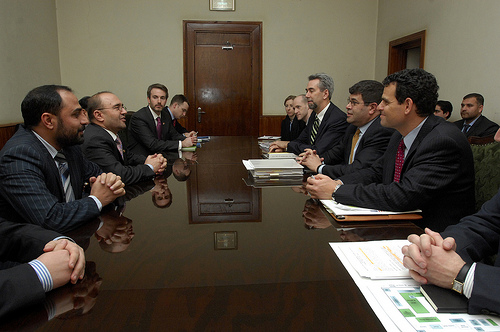
- Fitrat on left

Governor of Da Afghanistan Bank
- In office 2007–2011
- Preceded by: Noorullah Delwari
- Succeeded by: Noorullah Delwari

Personal details
- Born: Badakhshan Province, Afghanistan
- Died: April 28, 2024 Virginia

Abdul Qadir Fitrat (/ˈæbdʊl kəˈdɪər ˈfɪtræt/; died April 28, 2024) was the governor of Da Afghanistan Bank from 2007 to 2011. He fled to the United States and was wanted by the Government of Afghanistan. He was residing among the large Afghan-American community in Northern Virginia until his death in April 2024.

An ethnic Tajik, Fitrat was born in Badakhshan Province of Afghanistan. He attended primary school in his native province and secondary school in Kabul. He then moved to Pakistan and received a degree in economics from the International Islamic University in Islamabad. He immigrated to the United States and earned a master's degree from the Wright State University in Dayton, Ohio. By the late 1990s he began working for the International Monetary Fund (IMF) in Washington. Between 2000 and 2001, he worked for First Union National Bank in Northern Virginia and later for the World Bank. During the Presidency of Hamid Karzai, he was appointed as the governor of Afghanistan's central bank (Da Afghanistan Bank).

== Kabul Bank scandal and fleeing the country ==
Fitrat became one of the main figures after the 2010 Kabul Bank scandal, when its chairman Sherkhan Farnood and other insiders were spending the bank's $1 billion for their own personal lavish style living as well as lending money under the table to family, relatives and friends. In June 2011, the Afghan government issued an arrest warrant for Fitrat. In October 2012, then-President Hamid Karzai ordered Fitrat to return from the United States to Afghanistan. On April 28, 2024, Fitrat died of cancer in the United States.
