= Afghan pul =

Currency subdivision

50 Afghan pul coin (1980)
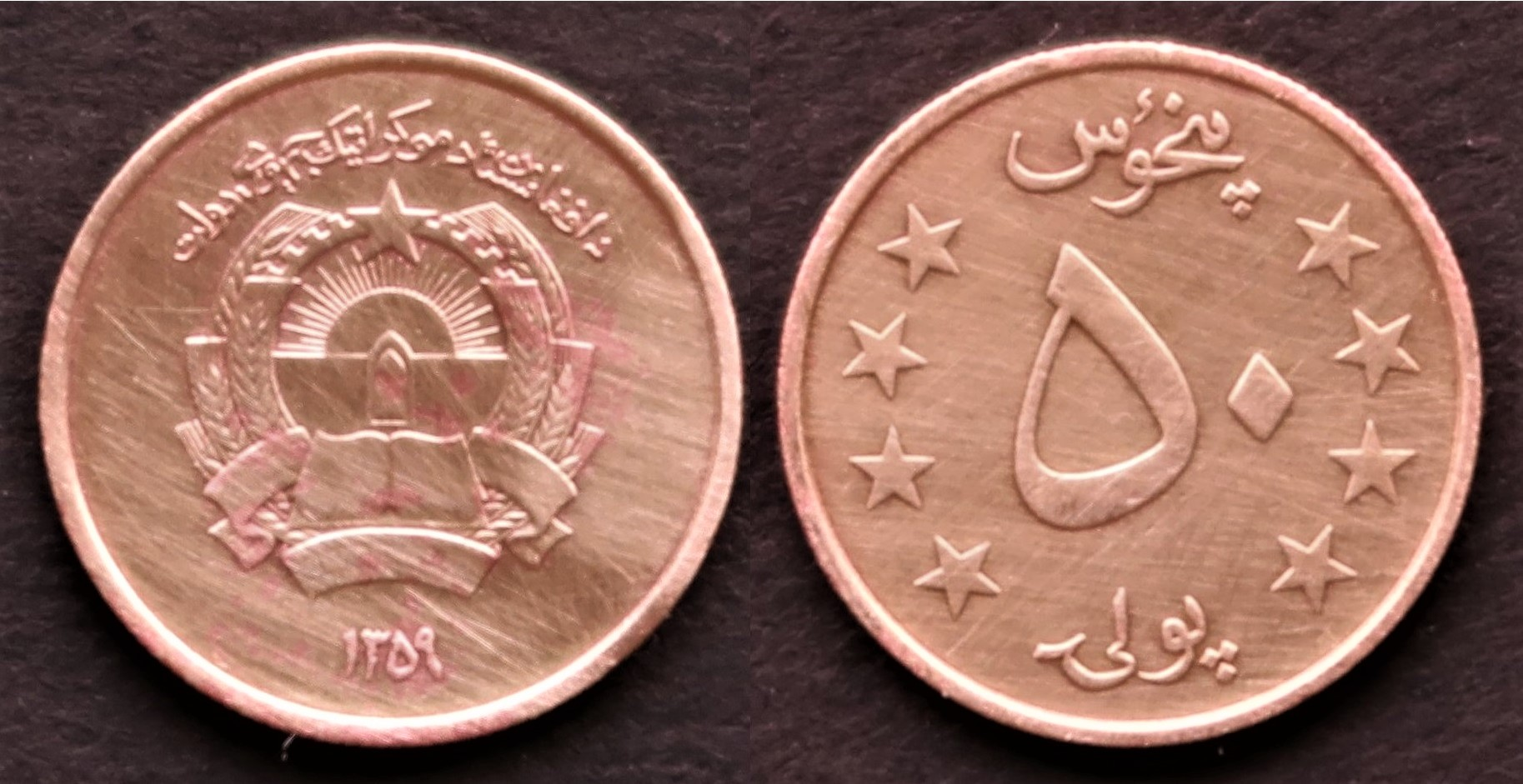
First side of the image: Obverse: Emblem of Afghanistan (1980). The text above reads دافغانستان دموکراتيک جمهورے دولت ('The Democratic Republic of Afghanistan'), and below it reads ١٣٥٩ ('1359' in Afghan calendar, equivalent to 1980).
Second side of the image: Reverse: Denomination surrounded with star at periphery. The texts read پنځوس ('Fifty Pul') and پولى٥٠.

Pul (Pashto: پول [pol]; Dari: پول [pʰʊl]) is the centesimal subdivision of the afghani, which has been the official currency of Afghanistan since the 1920s. All pul coins have been demonetized.

== History ==
Until the 1920s, the currency of Afghanistan was the Afghan rupee, which was subdivided into paisa. In 1923, the rupee was replaced by afghani as its official currency. One afghani is subdivided into 100 puls. At the time of introduction, a pul coin was made of copper and weighed one gram. However, a 10 pul coin weighed 6 grams.

== See also ==
- Postage stamps and postal history of Afghanistan
- Economy of Afghanistan
