= Bank-e-Millie Afghan =

Public sector bank in Afghanistan

Bank-e-Millie Afghan (BMA) | بانک ملی افغانستان | افغان ملي بانک
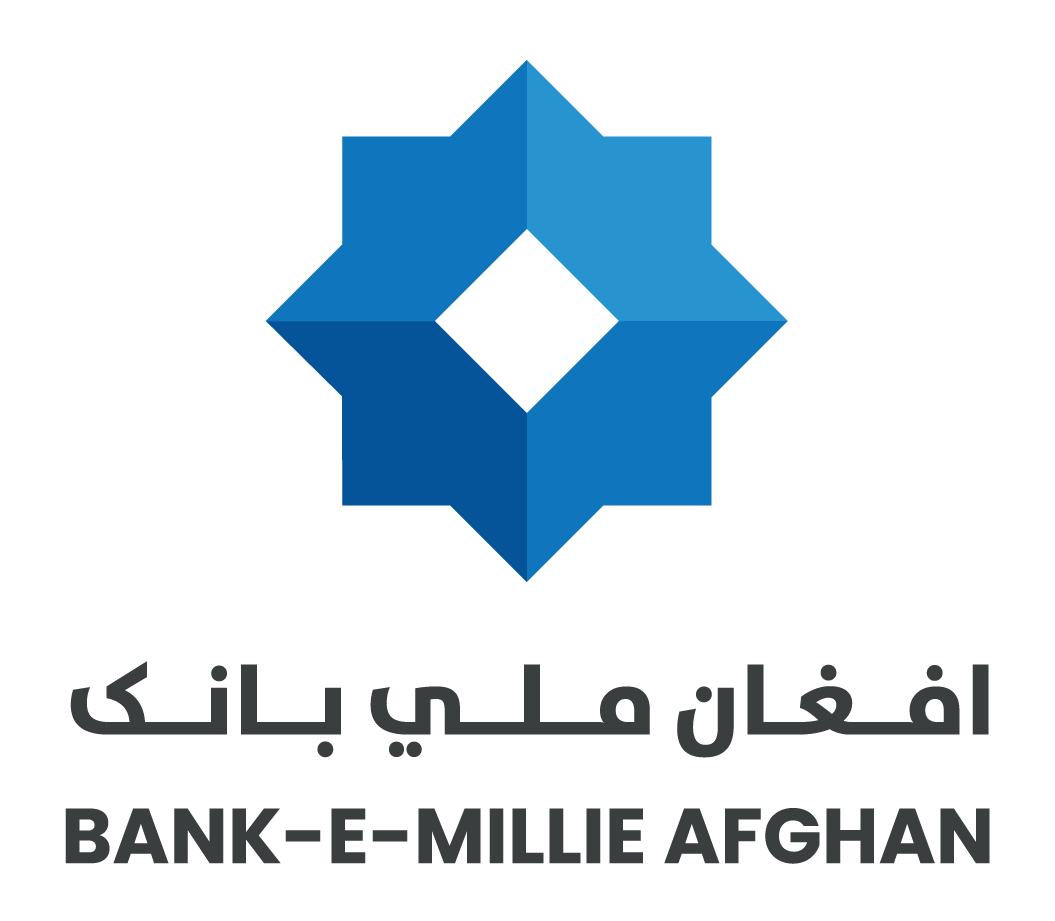
- Type: Public
- Industry: Banking
- Founded: 1933
- Founder: Abdul Majeed Zabuli
- Headquarters: Ibn-e-Sina Watt, ‌‌Beside Da Afghanistan Bank, Kabul - Afghanistan
- Number of locations: 39 Branches, 08 Counters, 23 ATMs
- Website: www.bma.com.af

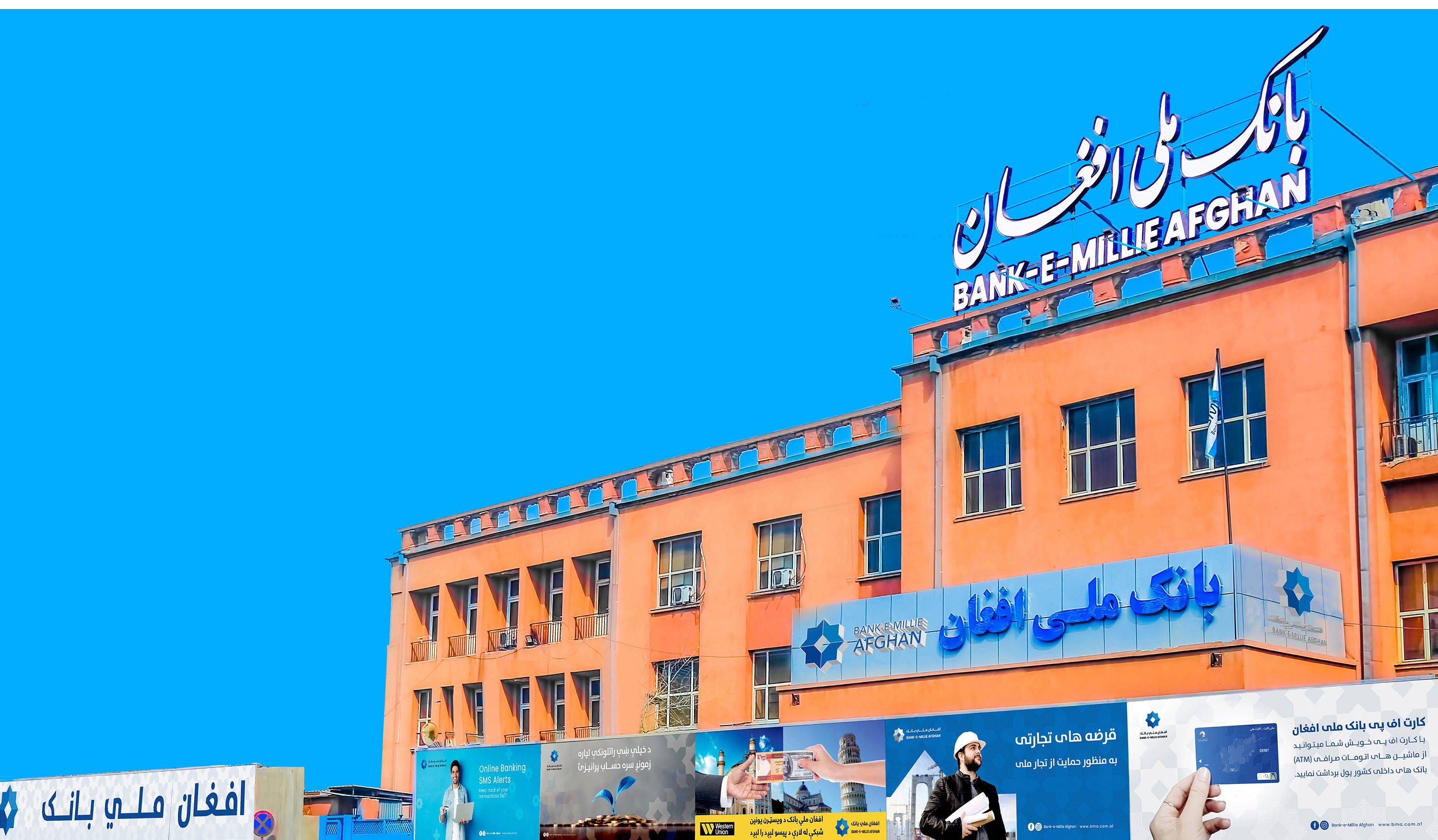
Bank-e-Millie Afghan's Head Office, Kabul

Established in 1933, Bank-e-Millie Afghan (BMA; افغان ملي بانک) is a public bank headquartered on Ibn-e-Sina Watt in Kabul. It was founded in 1933 by Abdul Majid Zabuli as the first private bank in Afghanistan, having originated from the Afghan Millie Company, to focus on the export and import activities of traders.

The bank was nationalized in 1976 under Mohammad Daoud Khan. Currently, the bank operates 15 city branches in Kabul and 21 provincial branches in Afghanistan.

== History ==
The bank was founded in 1933 as the first private bank in Afghanistan with a capital amount of around 9.6 million Afghanis. The bank's shareholder ownership was split with 72% of it held by private shareholders and the rest by the government of Afghanistan. It originated from the Afghan Millie Company. With the decree from the prime Minister of Afghanistan and the Cabinet of Afghanistan, Abdul Majid Zabuli founded the bank to focus on the export and import activities of traders in Afghanistan.

In 1933, it opened foreign branches in Berlin, Peshawar and Chaman. They continued to opened foreign branches in London in 1934 and in Panama in 1940. In Afghanistan, the bank was spread across its first six cities including Herat, Kandahar, Andkhoy, Mazar-i-Sharif, Ghazni, and Aqcha. The bank was nationalized in 1976 by Mohammad Daoud Khan and became a public bank.

== Operational ==
In 2004, the bank had five foreign branches, 10 branches in Kabul, and 13 provincial branches. It had 15 city branches in Kabul and 21 provincial branches. The headquarters is located in Ibn Sina Road, Kabul.
