= Haji Mohammad Idris =

Governor of Da Afghanistan Bank since 2021

Haji Mohammad Idris حاجی محمد ادریس

Governor of Da Afghanistan Bank (acting)
- In office 24 August 2021 – 8 October 2021
- Leader: Hibatullah Akhundzada
- Preceded by: Ajmal Ahmady
- Succeeded by: Shakir Jalali (acting)

Head of the Commission for Financial Affairs of the Islamic Emirate of Afghanistan
- Incumbent
- Assumed office c. 2001
- Leader: Mohammed Omar; Akhtar Mansoor; Hibatullah Akhundzada

Personal details
- Profession: politician

Haji Mohammad Idris (Pashto: حاجی محمد ادریس [hɑˈd͡ʒi mʊˈhamad idˈris]) who served as acting Governor of the Afghanistan Central Bank from 24 August 2021 to 8 October 2021. Idris was head of the Taliban's finance section, but he has no formal financial training or higher education.

In August 2021, Taliban spokesman Zabiullah Mujahid said in a statement that the leadership of the Islamic Emirate had given Haji Mohammad Idris the responsibility of the Central Bank of Afghanistan. The purpose of the appointment is to organize government institutions and the banking system and solve public problems.
