= Aina-i-Tirhut =

Book written by Bihari Lal Fitrat

Tawarikh-ul-Fitrat Maroof Aina-i-Tirhut
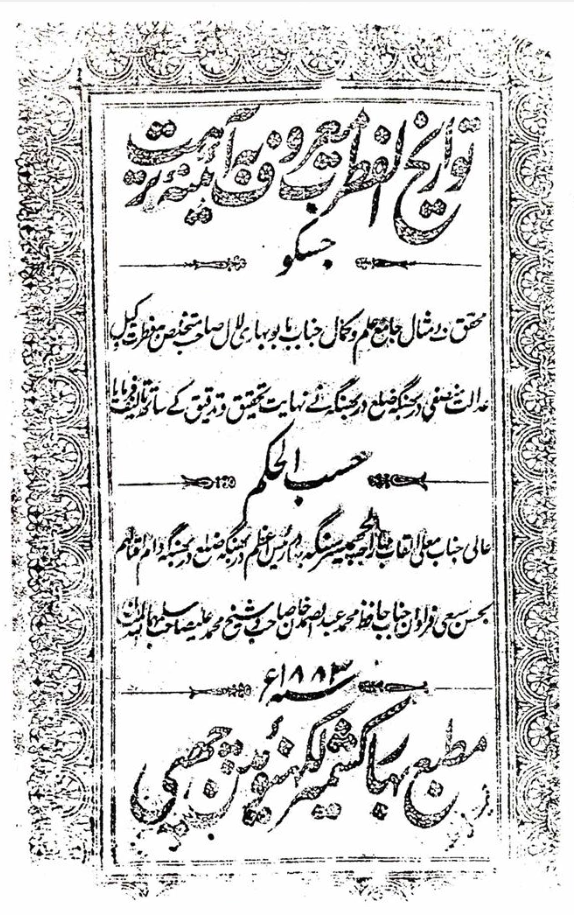
- Author: Bihari Lal Fitrat
- Language: Urdu
- Publisher: Bahar Kashmir Press, Lucknow
- Publication date: 1883

'Aina-i-Tirhut (آئینۂ ترہت) is a history book written by Bihari Lal Fitrat in Urdu language. It is one of the first attempt to cataloguing and compiling the history of Mithila, Bihar. It was first published in 1883 by Bahar Kashmir Press, Lucknow. The book full name is 'Tawarikh-ul-Fitrat Maroof Aina-i-Tirhut'.

The modern version of this book is edited by Hetukar Jha and includes materials in both Hindi and Urdu to maintain the work's original linguistic and cultural context. The book title of the new version is Mithila in the nineteenth century: Aina-i-Tirhut of Bihari Lal "Fitrat". This book has been completed with the support of then Darbhanga Maharaj Lakshmeshwar Singh.

== Contextual background ==
Print culture and print capitalism began to take hold in North India in the mid-19th century. Prior to this, there were high oral traditions. During this period, scholars from the Mithila region aimed to compile documents that would shape Mithila as a distinct “desha” (region). While the Maithili imagination of 'Desha' focused on Mithila’s social and cultural life, politically, they considered it an integral part of Bharatvarsha (India). Simultaneously, within the Hindi heartland, they sought a separate identity. The expansion of Hindi in Maithili-speaking areas coincided with tension between Hindi and Maithili. The modern Maithili community’s identity formation is tied to resisting Hindi’s expansionist agendas. Despite challenges, they assert their unique identity through language adaptation.

The first attempt to write the social and cultural history of Mithila with a distinct identity was made by scholar Ayodhya Prasad Bahar in his 1968 Urdu language book 'Riyaz-e-Tirhut'. After this, Aina-I-Tirhut came out in the Urdu language by Bihari Lal Fitrat in 1883. Later in the second decade of 20th century, Parmeshwar Jha (1856–1924) wrote 'Mithila Tatva Vimarsha', the first book on the history of Mithila in Maithili.

Ayodhya Prasad ‘Bahar’, Bihari Lal 'Fitrat', Ras Bihari Das, Parmeshwar Jha and Chanda Jha were the scholars who contributed to writing the historical and cultural landscape of Mithila in Hindi, Urdu and Maithili.

== Theme ==
The book emphasizes the unique pluralistic history of Mithila in terms of social, economic, cultural and Mithila identity. This book discusses the economic conditions of the people of Mithila, Language and dialect of the Mithila region, and Muzaffarpur as a modern city and dominant elite of this region. At that time, Maithili as a language of literature and documents had not been acknowledged but as a culture and society, it was in praxis from the ages.

In this book, there is a long list of biographies of personalities who have contributed to Mithila culture, identity and landscape. The author has also thrown light on the discussion on the language and dialect (dialect and language) of Mithila regions. How the masses and elites were talking and using language as expression. Persian, Sanskrit, Arabic and Urdu were an integral part of then Mithila culture but the local dialect was 'Ganwari' boli.

== Content ==
The book is originally in the Urdu language of then which has Persian dominants. Later, Hetukar Jha re-edited the work Bihari Lal Fitrat in English consisting of Hindi and Urdu versions of this.

In the oldest edition of this book, the book cover is in old Urdu calligraphy. Front cover shows the author name, profession and address along with the accumulation of Maharaja Darbhanga. The name of the book is written as 'Tawarikh-ul-Fitrat Maroof Aina-i-Tirhut'. The book has been came out with the order of the then Darbhanga Maharaj Lakshmeshwar Singh for his support and exclamations. On the cover it has been written as 'Hasbul Hukm' (A Royal Order). The cost has been mentioned as 2 rupees.

Aina-i-Tirhut has four part: First part has documented the early history of Mithila. There is a description of the reasons for naming Mithila, the population of Darbhanga city and the conditions from the time of the kings of ancient times till Maharaja Lakshmeshwar Singh Bahadur ascended the throne and the marriage customs of Maithili Brahmins.

The second part contains details of Vedic, Mimansa, Judicial, Grammarian, Poets, Saints and Rishis of Hindu community and Muslim Elders, Makhduman, Mashaikhan, Aliman and Kayastha scholars.

The third part contains details of the geographical and famine system of Tirhut district, details of the division of this district into two parts, details of the arrival of Nawab, Viceroy, Governor General Bahadur, description of Muzaffarpur as a modern city hub and details of the opening of the railway. Here, in this third part, a very important account of traditions related to tanks/wells has mentioned. The book has recorded the existence of dozens of tanks in each village in the region of Tirhut. This was part of the practice by the elites and landlords as social services. The book also traces the rise of Muzaffarpur as a centre of modernity and Western education. The role of Maithili Brahmins, Muslims and Bengalis in the formation of culture has been discussed in detail.

The fourth part contains details of the decency, reputation, ability, profession and arrogance of the rich, nobles, gentlemen, landlords, lawyers, judges, doctors(hakims).

This book's content is based on records, documents and surveys of the villages that author himself have conducted for five years. This book contains descriptive information related to pond, water irrigation land, indigo cultivation, farming and the condition of farmers.

== See also ==
- Mithila culture
- Mithila (region)
