= Ehsanullah Ehsan (banker) =

- Died: 1997
- Occupations: Banker, fighter
- Organization: Taliban
- Title: Governor of Da Afghanistan Bank
- Political party: Taliban

Mullah Ehsanullah Ehsan (died late 1997) was a former member of the Taliban leadership who served as the governor of Da Afghanistan Bank during the first Islamic Emirate era.

== Biography ==
He was originally from Kandahar and belongs to the Popalzai tribe. Shortly after the Taliban took over major Afghan institutions in December 1996, Ehsan, acting as Governor of Da Afghanistan Bank, declared most Afghani notes in circulation to be worthless and cancelled the contract with the Russian firm that had been printing the currency. Ehsan accused the firm of sending new shipments of Afghani notes to ousted president Burhanuddin Rabbani in northern Takhar province.

At the battle of Mazar-i-Sharif in 1997, Ehsan was captured by anti-Taliban forces, but was freed later during the battle. Afterwards, he led an elite group consisting of around 1,000 Kandaharis, ensuring his financial job received limited attention before he was killed.
