= Bihari Lal Fitrat =

Indian historian

Bihari Lal Fitrat was an Indian historian who focused on the history of Mithila. His major work was the Aina-i-Tirhut which was written in Urdu and published in 1883. The book was considered the first serious attempt at cataloguing the history of Mithila.

Bihari Lal Fitrat was born in 1829 into an elite family in Darbhanga. He qualified as a lawyer in 1856 and was made an honorary magistrate in 1877. He later worked in the court of Raj Darbhanga. He was versed in Maithili, Hindi, Urdu, Persian and Arabic.
