= Da Afghanistan Bank =

Central bank of Afghanistan

Da Afghanistan Bank د افغانستان بانک

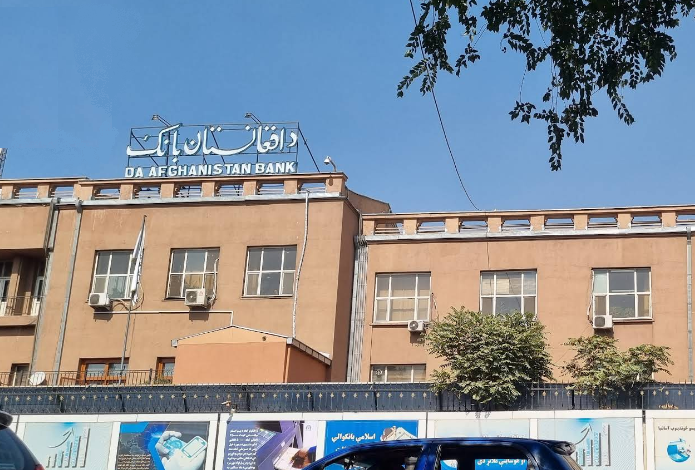
- Central bank of: Afghanistan
- Headquarters: Kabul, Afghanistan
- Established: 17 November 1939
- Ownership: 100% state ownership
- Governor: Noor Ahmad Agha
- Currency: Afghani; AFN (ISO 4217)
- Reserves: $10 billion
- Website: www.dab.gov.af

Da Afghanistan Bank (Pashto: د افغانستان بانک, romanized: Də Afǧānistān Bānk), also known as the Central Bank of Afghanistan (Dari: بانک مرکزی افغانستان, romanized: Bānk-i Markazī-yi Afǧānistān) or simply Bank of Afghanistan, regulates all banking and monetary transactions in Afghanistan. Established in 1939, the bank is wholly government-owned. It is active in developing policies to promote financial inclusion and a member of the Alliance for Financial Inclusion.

Da Afghanistan Bank currently has around 52 branches throughout the country, with seven of these in Kabul, where its headquarters is also based. Individual bank customers are allowed to withdraw up to 350,000 afghanis ($5,000 USD) a week or up to 1 million afghanis a month. Taxes are paid directly to the central bank, and there is a policy against officials handling tax money.

== Seal of the bank ==
The seal of Da Afghanistan Bank has the name of the bank in Pashto at the top and Latin script at the bottom, the year 1939 in which it was established, and a depiction of a Eucratides I-era coin with the Greek text, "ΒΑΣΙΛΕΩΣ ΜΕΓΑΛΟΥ ΕΥΚΡΑΤΙΔΟΥ" which means "Of the great king Eucratides".

== Mission ==
Basic tasks of DAB are:

- Formulate, adopt and execute the monetary policy of Afghanistan.
- Hold and manage the official foreign-exchange reserves of Afghanistan.
- Print and issue afghani banknotes and coins.
- Act as banker and adviser to, and as fiscal agent of the state.
- License, regulate and supervise banks, foreign exchange dealers, money service providers, payment system operators, securities service providers, securities transfer system operators.
- Establish, maintain and promote sound and efficient systems for payments, for transfers of securities issued by the state or DAB, and for the clearing and settlement of payment transactions and transactions in such securities.
- Accept foreign bank applications from banks that wish to operate in Afghanistan.

== List of governors ==
Legend

Acting Governor

No.	Portrait	Name	Took office	Left office	Notes	Ref.
1		Habibullah Malie Achekzai	1954	1960		
2		Abdul Hay Azizi	1960	1975		
3		Mohammad Hakim Khan	1975	1980		
4		Ghulam Hussain Jujeni	1980	1982		
5		Mehrabuddin Paktiawal	1982	1985		
6		Abdul Basir Ranjbar	1985	1988		
7		Mohammad Kabir	1988	1990		
8		Khalil Sediq	1990	1991		
9		Abdul Wahab Asefi	1991	Unknown		
10		Najibullah Sahu	1992	Unknown		
11		Zabihullah Eltezam	Unknown	1993		
12		Ghulam Mohammed Yailaqi	1993	1993		
13		Mohammad Hakim Khan	1993	1995	Second term	
14		Ehsanullah Ehsan	1996	1997	During first Taliban government	
15		Abdul Samad Sani	1997	Unknown	During first Taliban government	
16		Mohammad Ahmadi	Unknown	2001	During first Taliban government	
17		Anwar ul-Haq Ahady	2002	2004		
18		Noorullah Delwari	2011	2014	Second term	
19		Abdul Qadir Fitrat	2007	2011	Second term	
20		Noorullah Delwari	2011	14 January 2015	Second term	
21		Khan Afzal Hadawal	14 January 2015	8 July 2015	Acting	
22		Khalil Sediq	8 July 2015	2019	Second term	
23		Wahidullah Nosher	2018	unknown	Acting	
24		Ajmal Ahmady	2019	August 2021	Acting	
25		Haji Mohammad Idris	August 2021	March 2023	Acting	
26		Hidayatullah Badri	March 2023	July 2024	Acting	
27		Noor Ahmad Agha	July 2024	Incumbent	Acting	

== Members of the Supreme Council ==
In July 2021, the Supreme Council at DAB consisted of:

- Ajmal Ahmady
- Shah Mohammad Mehrabi
- Katrin Fakiri
- Abdul Wakil Muntazer
- Muhammad Naim Azimi

== Seizure of US-based assets ==
DAB owned about US$7 billion in assets held at the Federal Reserve Bank of New York. After the 2021 Taliban seizure of power, a group of about 150 relatives of victims of the September 11 attacks attempted to use a judgement from the SDNY case Havlish v. Bin Laden to gain control of these assets, asserting that they were now legally the Taliban's and thus could be used to pay damages to 9/11 victims' families. After a period of deliberation, the Biden administration went along with the request, dividing the assets into two halves, one of which would be allocated to the plaintiffs as potential damages, and the other which would be used to set up a trust fund to "support the needs of the Afghan people" but which the Taliban government would remain barred from accessing. On 26 August 2022, a judge recommended to not award damages as the bank is "immune from jurisdiction" and that it would "acknowledge" the Taliban as the legitimate Afghan government. On 21 February 2023, the request of the relatives was denied, with Judge George B. Daniels stating that he was "constitutionally restrained" from allowing access to the funds.

== See also ==
- Afghan afghani
- Afghan frozen assets
- Economy of Afghanistan
- Ministry of Finance (Afghanistan)
- New Kabul Bank
- List of central banks
- List of financial supervisory authorities by country
