= Abdul Majid Zabuli =

Afghan banker

Abdul Majid Zabuli (August 14, 1896 – November 23, 1998) was the founder of Afghanistan's banking system. He founded the Ashami company in 1932, which eventually became the Afghan National Bank (Bank-e-Mili Afghan).

== Early life and education ==
Zabuli was born in Ghazni province, Nawa district, Husain Khail village in 1896. He was then educated in Tashkent before spending some time in Berlin. Mohammed Nadir Shah's government requested that Zabuli return to Afghanistan to assist with economic affairs of the state.

== Early attempts to establish a national bank ==
Until 1930, both public and private trade and banking in Afghanistan occurred through financing provided by money bazaars. When trade was disrupted due to a revolt against Amānullāh Khān, Zabuli suggested the establishment of a national bank. This had been previously suggested by Amanullah and had been rejected on religious grounds. However, Zabuli was given permission by Mohammed Nadir Shah to establish a joint stock company in its place. Even though the company was given a monopoly over imports of sugar, petroleum and motor vehicles as well as exports of cotton, karakul and wool it was not a successful venture.

== Establishment of the Afghan National Bank (Bank-e-Mili Afghan) ==
In 1931, Abdul Majid Zabuli was able to use the investment capital he had accrued through the cotton trade with Russia to establish Afghanistan's first investment bank. While privately owned, the Bank-e-Meli Afghan was given power over currency regulation and acted as a de facto government organisation. Abdul Majid Zabuli was the major shareholder of the bank until it was nationalized in 1975 by Afghan President Sardar Daud. Until the bank was nationalized in 1975, Zabuli directed the affairs of the Bank from his residence in Nahant, Massachusetts, U.S.A. and appointed all the executives of the bank and the bank owned enterprises.

== Political career ==
Zabuli was a supporter of the Weekh Zalmian movement. It called for the youth of Afghanistan to work for the common good of their country without recourse to outside interference, the eradication of bribery and oppression, legal rights for women and the furtherance of the national economy.

In 1948, Abdul Majid Zabuli visited Washington in his role as Minister of National Economy. He requested that the US provide arms and financial assistance to Afghanistan to allay concerns in Afghanistan regarding possible Soviet aggressions following the British withdrawal from India. Both these requests were denied.
