= Special Inspector General for Afghanistan Reconstruction =

U.S. government's leading oversight authority on Afghanistan reconstruction

Office of the Special Inspector General for Afghanistan Reconstruction (SIGAR)
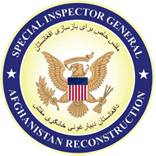

Agency overview
- Formed: 2008
- Jurisdiction: United States Government
- Headquarters: Crystal City, Virginia, U.S.
- Employees: About 60 (June 2025)
- Agency executive: Gene Aloise, acting special inspector general

The Office of the Special Inspector General for Afghanistan Reconstruction (SIGAR) was the U.S. government's leading oversight authority on Afghanistan reconstruction. Congress created the Office of the Special Inspector General for Afghanistan Reconstruction to provide independent and objective oversight of Afghanistan reconstruction funds. Under the authority of Section 1229 of the National Defense Authorization Act for Fiscal Year 2008 (PL 110-181), SIGAR conducted audits, inspections, and investigations to promote efficiency and effectiveness of reconstruction programs, and to detect and prevent waste, fraud, and abuse of taxpayer dollars. SIGAR also had a hotline that allowed individuals to report suspected fraud.

== Quarterly reports ==
Public Law 110-181 directed SIGAR to submit a quarterly report to Congress. This congressionally mandated report summarizes SIGAR's audits and investigative activities. The report also provides an overview of reconstruction activities in Afghanistan and includes a detailed statement of all obligations, expenditures, and revenues associated with reconstruction.

As part of its legislative mandate, SIGAR tracked the status of U.S. funds appropriated, obligated, and disbursed for reconstruction activities in Afghanistan in its quarterly report. As of September 30, 2019, the United States had appropriated approximately $132.55 billion for relief and reconstruction in Afghanistan since FY 2002. These funds have been allocated into four major areas:

- $82.55 billion for security ($4.57 billion for counternarcotics initiatives)
- $34.46 billion for governance and development ($4.37 billion for counternarcotics initiatives)
- $3.85 billion for humanitarian aid
- $11.70 billion for civilian operations

== History ==
=== Creation ===
The Office of the Special Inspector General for Afghanistan Reconstruction was created with the enactment of Public Law 110-181, which President George W. Bush signed into law on January 28, 2008.

=== Leadership ===
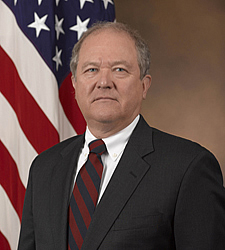
Sopko in 2012

In 2012, President Barack Obama selected John F. Sopko to serve as the special inspector general. Sopko had more than thirty years of experience in oversight and investigations as a prosecutor, congressional counsel, and senior federal government advisor. He came to SIGAR from Akin Gump Strauss Hauer & Feld LLP, an international law firm headquartered in Washington, D.C., where he had been a partner since 2009. Sopko's government experience includes over twenty years on Capitol Hill, where he held key positions in both the Senate and House of Representatives. He served on the staffs of the House Committee on Energy and Commerce, the Select Committee on Homeland Security and the Senate Permanent Subcommittee on Investigations.

The inspector general post was previously held by Steve Trent (acting), Herb Richardson (acting), and Arnold Fields.

While serving as inspector general, Sopko testified multiple times before Congress on behalf of SIGAR.

Gene Aloise joined SIGAR on September 4, 2012, as the deputy inspector general. In this role, he oversaw day-to-day operations of the agency and assisted the inspector general in executing SIGAR's mission. Aloise came to SIGAR from the Government Accountability Office (GAO), where he served for 38 years. He has years of experience developing, leading, and managing GAO domestic and international work. His experience included assignments with congressional committees as well as various offices within GAO.

John Sopko was among the inspectors general fired by President Donald Trump in late January 2025. Gene Aloise led the agency in an acting capacity after Sopko's dismissal.

=== Staffing and locations ===
According to the organization's October 2014 report to Congress, SIGAR employed 197 individuals. The report noted that SIGAR had twenty-nine employees at the U.S. embassy in Kabul and eight other employees in Afghan locations outside the U.S. embassy. SIGAR staff members were stationed at four locations across the country, including Kandahar and Bagram Airfields, Mazar-i-Sharif, and the U.S. embassy in Kabul. SIGAR employed three local Afghans in its Kabul office to support the investigations and audits directorates.

=== Recognitions ===
- In October 2014, over two dozen SIGAR staffers were recognized for outstanding achievements at the 17th Annual Inspector General Community awards ceremony. The awards included the Sentner award, two awards for audit excellence, and two awards for excellence special act.
- In October 2012, SIGAR Audit and Investigative Teams won CIGIE Awards for Excellence. The awards included the Sentner award, an award for audit excellence and an investigation award for excellence.
- In May 2012, SIGAR special agents received a Public Service Award today from the U.S. Attorney's Office for the Eastern District of Virginia for their work in a major bribery case in Afghanistan.
- In October 2011, a SIGAR audit team was presented the Sentner Award for Dedication and Courage for its work in Laghman Province auditing the Commander's Emergency Response Program.
- In October 2011, another SIGAR team won an Award for Excellence for its audit of Afghan National Security Force facilities.

=== Non-governmental organization (NGO) recognition and assistance ===
SIGAR, and its reports, findings and information have also been widely discussed and distributed on Capitol Hill, the US Congress and with U.S. policymakers, by the Washington, D.C.–based Afghanistan Foundation, a non-profit public policy research organization (NGO). SIGAR's efforts have helped educated and inform policymakers in public policy research organizations, and think tanks, about issues regarding U.S. assistance programs, aid levels, and various projects, in Afghanistan, including problems of corruption in Afghanistan, the Kabul Bank crisis, and other important matters.

=== Investigations ===
The Washington Post has filed FOIA lawsuits for government documents related to documents produced by the agency's Lessons Learned Program. While the legal matter is pending before Judge Amy Berman Jackson of the U.S. District Court in the District of Columbia, unedited transcripts of interviews have been released which reveal a pattern of disinformation on the part of U.S. government officials.

=== Activities after the 2021 Taliban takeover of Afghanistan ===
After the fall of the Islamic Republic of Afghanistan on August 15, 2021, and the US troop withdrawal from that country, SIGAR investigated the root causes of the collapse of the Afghan government and the Afghan National Defense and Security Forces (ANDSF), releasing a pair of reports that recounted each failure:

- Why the Afghan Government Collapsed November 1, 2022
- Why the Afghan Security Forces Collapsed February 1, 2023

In April 2023, SIGAR told the Congress that they can't assure American aid to Afghanistan is not currently being used to fund the Taliban government.

== Oversight activity ==
=== Audits ===
SIGAR's Audits Directorate conducted audits and inspections of reconstruction activities in Afghanistan. These audits were aimed at a range of programs and activities to fulfill SIGAR's legislative mandate. They identified problems associated with the United States' reconstruction effort, and made recommendations to improve efficiency and effectiveness.

SIGAR's audits ranged from assessments of program direction to narrower examinations of specific contracts or aspects of contract and program management. SIGAR's inspections were quick-impact assessments to determine whether infrastructure projects had been properly constructed, were being used as intended, and could be sustained. SIGAR also conducted forensic reviews of reconstruction funds managed by the Department of Defense, Department of State, and the U.S. Agency for International Development. These forensic reviews identified anomalies that may have indicated fraud.

=== Investigations ===
The Investigations Directorate conducted criminal and civil investigations of waste, fraud, and abuse relating to programs and operations supported with U.S. funds allocated for the reconstruction of Afghanistan. Results were achieved through criminal prosecutions, civil actions, forfeitures, monetary recoveries and suspension and debarments.

To accomplish its mission, SIGAR had full federal law enforcement authority through its enabling legislation as defined by the National Defense Authorization Act of 2008. SIGAR's Special Agents investigated crimes involving federal procurement fraud, contract fraud, theft, corruption, bribery of government employees and public officials, and a variety of civil matters pertaining to waste and abuse of U.S. taxpayer dollars.

- As of its October 2014 quarterly report to Congress, SIGAR had 322 ongoing investigations.

=== Special projects ===
SIGAR's Special Projects team was created to examine emerging issues and deliver prompt, actionable reports to federal agencies and the Congress. Special Project's reports covered a wide range of programs and activities and the office was made up of auditors, analysts, investigators, lawyers, subject-matter experts and other specialists who were able to quickly and jointly apply their expertise to emerging problems and questions.

=== Partners ===
Under its enabling legislation, SIGAR coordinated with and received the cooperation of the following organizations while conducting oversight of U.S. reconstruction efforts in Afghanistan:

- Office of the Inspector General, U.S. Department of Defense
- Office of the Inspector General of the Department of State
- Office of Inspector General, U.S. Agency for International Development

SIGAR and the inspectors general for the U.S. Agency for International Development, Defense Department, and Department of State jointly developed and agreed to a strategic plan for oversight of the roughly $104 billion in U.S. funds appropriated for Afghanistan reconstruction.

== See also ==
- Afghanistan Papers – Internal documents about the US war in Afghanistan
- Afghanistan War Commission – Bipartisan war commission for US war operations in Afghanistan
