= Integrity Watch Afghanistan =

Afghan non-governmental organization

Integrity Watch Afghanistan (IWA) is an Afghan non-governmental organization that works to increase transparency (social), integrity and accountability in Afghanistan through the provision of policy-oriented research, monitoring, capacity building and advocacy on political corruption and aid effectiveness.

== History ==
IWA was created in October 2005 and developed a National Corruption Survey which measures Afghans' perspective on petty corruption. Prior to 2010 the Corruption Survey included only a few of the 34 provinces and was not able to give a national overview of the corruption situation in Afghanistan. In the 2010 National Corruption Survey, 32 out of the 34 provinces of Afghanistan were covered but the survey still faces some limitations as it was unable to survey areas that are in conflict and under pure Taliban control.

IWA's research measures the evolution of corruption trends and habits in Afghanistan and produces training tools to raise awareness about corruption. The organisation also works to strengthen local capacities to prevent corruption within the Afghan public institutions, private sector, civil society organisations and the public at large. IWA has three programmatic pillars: Community Based Monitoring, Public Service Monitoring and Extractive Industries Monitoring.

IWA has partnered with numerous like minded Afghan and international organisations since its inception, solidifying its position as the premiere anti-corruption civil society organisation in Afghanistan while also furthering its mission in support of transparency and accountability for Afghans and gaining recognition as an Afghan non-governmental organisation (NGO) watch dog by the United Nations.
