= New Kabul Bank =

Private bank in Afghanistan

- Type: Private bank
- Founded: Kabul Bank (2004), New Kabul Bank (2011)
- Headquarters: Kabul, Afghanistan
- Website: New Kabul Bank

New Kabul Bank is a bank in Afghanistan that has its main branch in the capital city of Kabul. It was established in 2004 as the Kabul Bank, the first private bank in Afghanistan. After corruption and scandals it was re-established in 2011 as the New Kabul Bank.

It is the main bank used to pay the salaries of the national army and security police forces. The bank provides facilities to maintain accounts in Current, Savings Bank, and Fixed deposits; and offers its consumers branch and automated teller machine services. The bank is under the supervision of the Central Bank of Afghanistan (Da Afghanistan Bank−DAB), the General Directorate of Treasury, and the Afghanistan Ministry of Finance (MOF).

== History ==
=== Founding ===
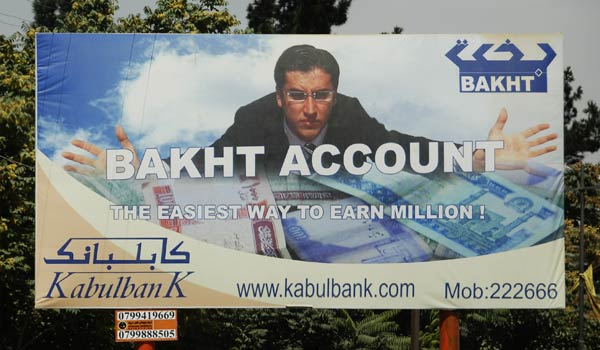
An advertisement for the Bakht Account (Lucky Account)

The Kabul Bank was established in 2004. It is connected throughout the globe with SWIFT facility, which enables fund transfer for its customers. The bank has correspondent relationship with seven international banks situated in Germany, China, Iran, Tajikistan, Saudi Arabia and India.

=== Corruption scandal ===
Kabul Bank was badly shaken in 2011, in one of "the worst banking scandals in history", according to The Guardian newspaper. In late 2012, according to the Los Angeles Times, independent investigators and journalists uncovered widespread corruption in Kabul Bank. The New York Times, in 2012, headlines indicate "Audit Says Kabul Bank Began as 'Ponzi Scheme'" following investigation and judicial action in the aftermath of the Bank's crisis and scandal.

In 2010, it was disclosed that its Chairman other insiders were spending the bank's US$1 billion for their own personal lavish style living and lending money under the table to family, relatives and friends. In September 2010, one of the principal owners of the bank said that depositors had withdrawn $180 million in two days and predicted a "revolution" in the country's financial system unless the Afghan government and the United States moved quickly to help stabilize the bank. In November 2010, reports appeared that Farnood and chief executive Khalilullah Frozi both had been sacked from duties; as of early 2011 both were effectively under house arrest and could not leave the country, and in July 2011 both were formally arrested and detained in Kabul. DAB stated in February 2011, it would seek to sell Kabul Bank within three years once it was rehabilitated, but both the International Monetary Fund and US officials subsequently pressed for a rapid wind down of the institution. A USAID inspector general report estimated that fraudulent loans diverted $850 million to bank insiders. By October 2011, more than a year after the government seized control, officials had recovered less than 10 percent of the nearly $1 billion that went missing.

In 2010, mobs of customers massed outside of bank locations. President Karzai's brother, Mahmood Karzai, is reported to have played a significant role in the bank scandal, and is alleged to have received millions of dollars in loans from Kabul Bank. He was later alleged to be under investigation by a U.S. Federal grand jury and U.S. tax authorities, including the U.S. Internal Revenue Service for tax evasion allegations. Canada's Maclean's magazine reported that Mahmoud Karzai was being investigated for racketeering, extortion and tax evasion as a result of connections to the bank and Hamid Karzai. On 27 December 2010, a suicide car bomber killed at least three Afghans, including one policeman, as he targeted police officers who lined up to withdraw their salaries in front of Kabul Bank in central Kandahar; the midday explosion also wounded 16 policemen and five civilians.

=== 2011 ===
On 19 February 2011, at least 38 people (including 13 policemen) were killed during an insurgent raid on a branch of Kabul Bank in Jalalabad, the provincial capital of Nangarhar. Three suicide bombers reportedly entered the bank and detonated themselves, and fighting between insurgents and security forces continued for over four hours; President Hamid Karzai and a NATO International Security Assistance Force spokesman condemned the attack, which was the deadliest in the country since June 2010. Two surviving attackers, including teenageer Zar Ajam, were swiftly tried and hanged at Pul-e-Charkhi prison in Kabul in June 2011.

In its July 2011 review of the Kabul Bank scandal and aftermath, international non-governmental organization (NGO) Transparency International raised repeated concerns about problems of corruption in Afghanistan and its impact on the economy, business investment, security and civil society. In October, the Washington Post reported that Mahmood Karzai could soon be indicted for tax evasion in the U.S., though he denied the charges, telling the newspaper: "I'm very clean", and insisting his only interest was "rebuilding Afghanistan."

In mid-January 2011, acting chief financial officer and other Pakistani employees of Kabul Bank fled to Pakistan, apparently out of fear for their lives and possible arrest, though some said they were being made scapegoats for powerful shareholders. Afghan authorities also called in several bank managers, including foreigners, for questioning and detained some in southern Afghanistan's Helmand Province in connection with illicit transfers of bank funds.

In early February 2011, DAB Governor Abdul Qadir Fitrat said the central bank would impose stricter rules on banks wanting to handle about US$1.5 billion worth of salaries for government and security officials, which until now has been done by Kabul Bank. Fitrat also told Reuters the total amount of money at risk over suspected irregularities at Kabul Bank amounted to $579 million, almost twice the figure estimated when the bank's troubles first surfaced. Fitrat dismissed concerns that it faced liquidation, saying it would be privately owned again within three years. "Kabulbank is stabilised, it has enough cash at its disposal and the central bank is trying to rehabilitate the bank and then at some point sell it to potential buyers in two or three years," Fitrat told Reuters. In early July 2011, Fitrat resigned as head of the central bank after fleeing to the United States, claiming his life had been threatened and that he was being made a scapegoat for politically connected individuals.

After a mid-February 2011 visit by Neal Wolin, the U.S. deputy Treasury secretary, the Afghan finance ministry said that weak international support had exacerbated the crisis. "Afghan and US officials agreed that (the crisis)... was compounded by the erroneous audit by PricewaterhouseCoopers, and ineffective international technical assistance and supervision", the ministry said. However, Wolin pressed the government to rapidly place the lender into receivership, echoing calls made by a previous International Monetary Fund (IMF) delegation. Since 2011, the Karzai Government has rejected banking oversight and reform efforts by the United States in the wake of the Kabul Bank scandal and collapse according to reports by the U.S. Special Inspector General for Afghanistan Reconstruction (SIGAR) in 2013–14.

Following the departure of Hamid Karzai in 2014, Ashraf Ghani re-opened efforts to recover funds lost by embezzlement, corruption, and fraud by the bank's insiders. Ghani vowed to seek to continue the investigation of the Kabul Bank crisis and fight corruption in Afghanistan. In October 2014, the Ghani Administration in Kabul reportedly officially re-opened the investigation.

In September 2010, the Afghan Central Bank said it was prepared to provide loans to the Kabul Bank, "if it requests". After the bailout by the government, by 2015, authorities were inviting bids to privatize the new bank. In 2016, Afghanistan's Joint-Stock Company offered to buy New Kabul Bank for $31 million. Pakistan's MCB Bank also made a bid, as New Kabul Bank was to be privatized in October 2018.

== See also ==
- Corruption in Afghanistan
- Da Afghanistan Bank
- Karzai family
- Special Inspector General for Afghanistan Reconstruction
- Transparency International
- Ferozi FC
