= Mayor of Depok =

- Wali Kota Depok
- Coat of arms of Depok

- 120px

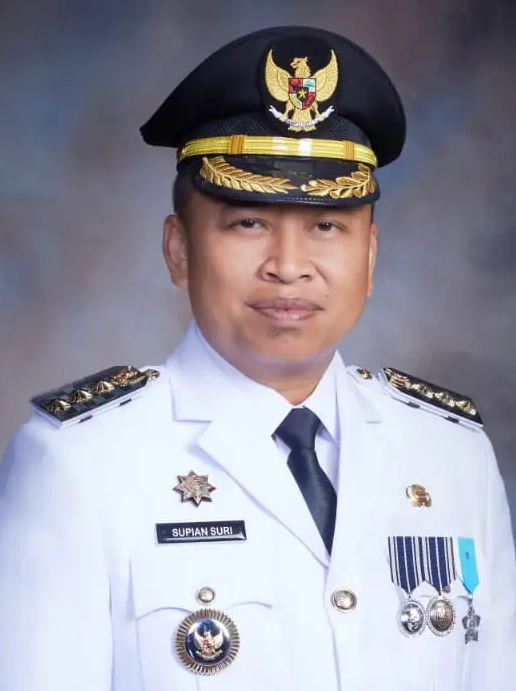
- Incumbent; Supian Suri since 20 February 2025
- Term length: 5 years
- Inaugural holder: Mochammad Rukasah Suradimadja
- Formation: March 18, 1981; 45 years ago
- Website: Official website

Mayor of Depok is the head of the second-level region who holds the government in Depok together with the Vice Mayor and 50 members of the Depok City Regional House of Representatives. The mayor and vice mayor of Depok are elected through general elections held every 5 years. The first mayor of Depok was Mochammad Rukasah Suradimadja, who governed the city period from 1981 to 1984.

Before becoming an autonomous city, Depok was an administrative city and was part of Bogor Regency.

== List ==
The following is a list of the names of the Mayors of Depok from time to time.

Administrative Mayor of Depok
Num.	Portrait	Mayor	Beginning of office	End of Term	Political Party / Faction	Period	Note.	Vice mayor
1		Mochammad Rukasah Suradimadja	18 March 1981	28 November 1984	Golkar (Note: The Joint Secretariat of Golongan Karya was not a political party during the period 1964 to 1998. Golkar is a group of Golkar groups that oversees several Parent Organization Groups (KINO), including the Republic of Indonesia Civil Servant Corps (KORPRI) which includes civil servants. This official was formerly a bureaucrat in the Ministry of Home Affairs of the Republic of Indonesia who was "employed" as an administrative mayor as well as a member of Golkar.)	1		N/A
2		Mochammad Ibid Tamdjid	28 November 1984	8 August 1988	Golkar	2		N/A
3		Abdul Wachyan	8 August 1988	26 March 1991	Golkar	3		N/A
4		Mohammad Masduki	26 March 1991	20 June 1992	Golkar	4		N/A
5		Sofyan Safari Hamim	20 June 1992	14 May 1996	Golkar	5		N/A
6		Yuyun Wirasaputra	14 May 1996	31 October 1997	Golkar	6		N/A
7		Badrul Kamal	31 October 1997	27 April 1999	Golkar	7		N/A
Mayor of Depok
Num.	Portrait	Mayor	Beginning of office	End of Term	Political Party / Faction	Period	Note.	Vice mayor
1		Badrul Kamal (1945–2026)	15 March 2000	15 March 2005	Golkar	8		Yus Ruswandi (2000–2005)
2		Nur Mahmudi Ismail (born 1961)	26 January 2006	26 January 2011	PKS	9 (2005)		Yuyun Wirasaputra (2006–2011)
2		Nur Mahmudi Ismail (born 1961)	26 January 2011	26 January 2016	PKS	10 (2010)		Mohammad Idris (2011–2016)
3		Mohammad Idris (born 1961)	17 February 2016	17 February 2021	Independent (until 2022) PKS (since 2022)	11 (2015)		Pradi Supriatna (2016–2021)
3		Mohammad Idris (born 1961)	26 February 2021	20 February 2025	Independent (until 2022) PKS (since 2022)	12 (2020)		Imam Budi Hartono (2021–2025)
4		Supian Suri (born 1975)	20 February 2025	Incumbent	Gerindra	13 (2024)		Chandra Rahmansyah (2025–now)

== Temporary replacement ==
In the government stack, a regional head who submits himself to leave or temporarily resigns from his position to the central government, then the Minister of Home Affairs prepares a replacement who is a bureaucrat in the regional government or even a vice mayor, including when the mayor's position is in a transition period.

Portrait	Mayor	Party	Beginning	End	Duration	Period	Definitive	Ref.
	Badrul Kamal (Acting)	Independent	27 April 1999	15 March 2000	323 days	–	Transition (1999–2000)	
	Warma Sutarman (Acting Officer)	Independent	15 March 2005	28 August 2005	177 days	–	Transition (2005–2006)	
	Warma Sutarman (Acting Officer)	Independent	28 August 2005	8 September 2005	177 days	–	Transition (2005–2006)	
	Nu'man Abdul Hakim (Daily executive)	Independent	8 September 2005	21 September 2005	13 days	–	Transition (2005–2006)	
	Warma Sutarman (Acting)	Independent	21 September 2005	26 January 2006	127 days	–	Transition (2005–2006)	
	Mohammad Idris (Acting Officer)	Independent	19 January 2015	3 February 2015	15 days	10 (2010)	Nur Mahmudi Ismail; 2011–2016	
	Arifin Harun Kertasaputra (Acting)	Independent	26 January 2016	17 February 2016	22 days	–	Transition (2016)	
	Dedi Supandi (Acting Officer)	Independent	26 September 2020	5 December 2020	70 days	11 (2015)	Mohammad Idris; 2016–2021	
	Sri Utomo (Daily executive)	Independent	17 February 2021	26 February 2021	9 days	–	Transition (2021)	

== See also ==
- Depok
- List of incumbent regional heads and deputy regional heads in West Java
