= 2024 Depok mayoral election =

- 27 November 2024
- Registered: 1,423,747
- Turnout: 61.71% (▼1.55pp)
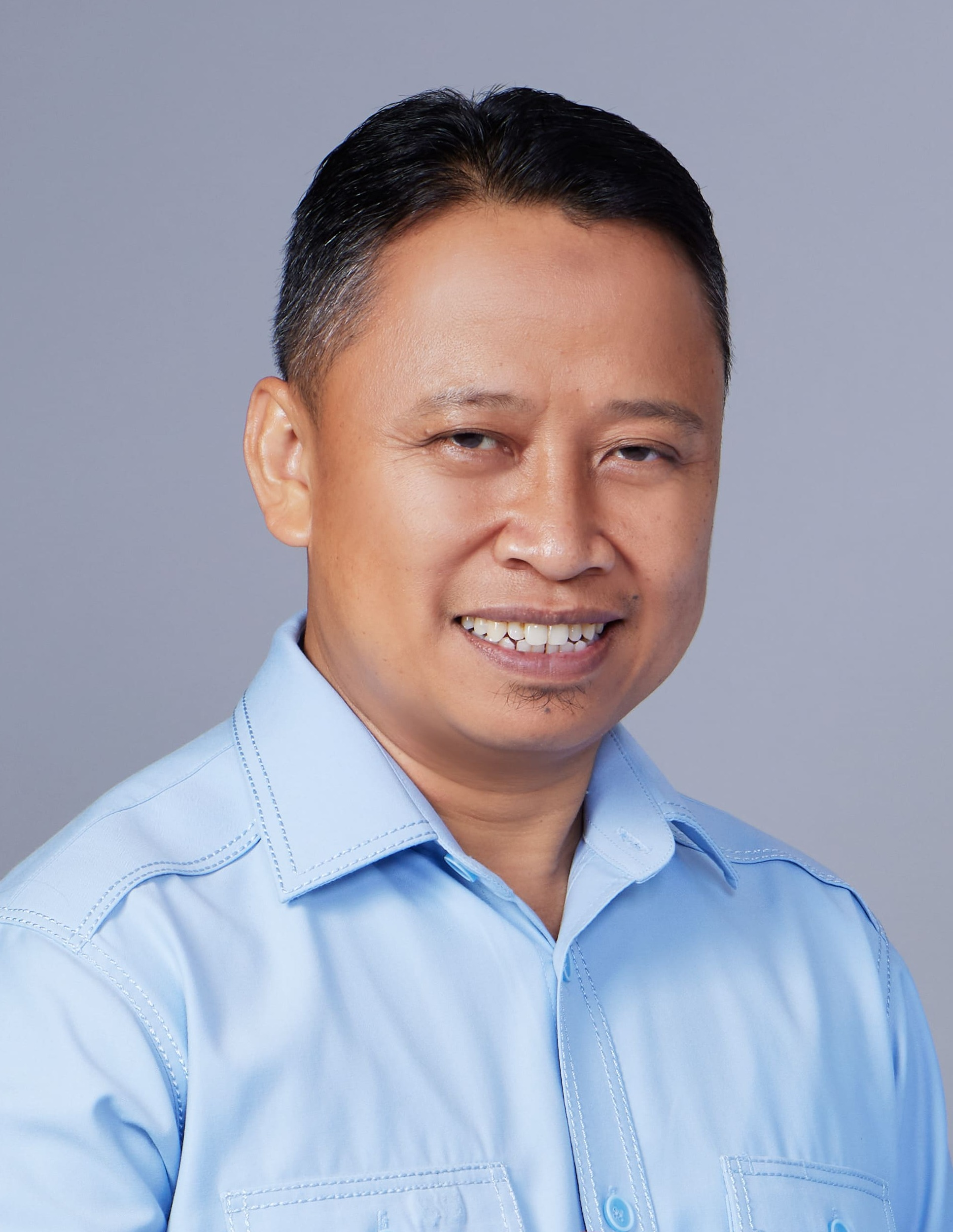

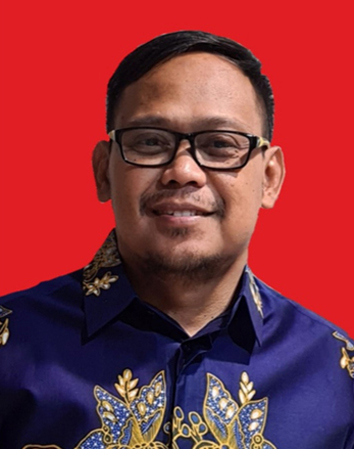
Candidate	Supian Suri	Imam Budi Hartono
Party	Gerindra	PKS
Running mate	Chandra Rahmansyah	Ririn Farabi
Popular vote	451,785	396,863
Percentage	53.24%	46.76%
- Results map by subdistrict and district (Interactive version)
Mayor before election
Mohammad Idris
PKS
Elected mayor
Supian Suri
Gerindra

The 2024 Depok mayoral election was held on 27 November 2024 as part of nationwide local elections to elect the mayor and vice mayor of Depok for a five-year term. The previous election was held in 2020. Gerindra Party member Supian Suri won the election with 53% of the vote, ending nearly 20 years of Prosperous Justice Party (PKS) control of the municipal government. Vice Mayor Imam Budi Hartono of the PKS received 46%.

== Electoral system ==
The election, like other local elections in 2024, follow the first-past-the-post system where the candidate with the most votes wins the election, even if they do not win a majority. It is possible for a candidate to run uncontested, in which case the candidate is still required to win a majority of votes "against" an "empty box" option. Should the candidate fail to do so, the election will be repeated on a later date.

== Candidates ==
According to electoral regulations, in order to qualify for the election, candidates are required to secure support from a political party or a coalition of parties controlling 10 seats in the Depok Regional House of Representatives (DPRD). The Prosperous Justice Party, with 13 seats from the 2024 legislative election, is the only party eligible to nominate a mayoral candidate without a coalition. Candidates may alternatively demonstrate support in form of photocopies of identity cards, which in Depok's case corresponds to 90,563 copies. Although there were consultations, no such candidates registered with the General Elections Commission (KPU) within the allowed time.

Incumbent mayor Mohammad Idris had served two full terms as mayor, and hence was ineligible to run in the election.

=== Declared ===
These are candidates who have been nominated by political parties in the election:

1
Candidate from PKS and Golkar
Imam Budi Hartono	Ririn Farabi
for Mayor	for Vice Mayor
Vice Mayor of Depok (2021–2025)	Doctor
Parties
20 / 50 (40%) PKS (13 seats); Golkar (7 seats)

The Mayor for the 2021–2025 period, Mohammad Idris, according to applicable law, cannot run again as a candidate in the mayoral or regental elections. Therefore, PKS is re-advancing its cadres in the mayoral elections. PKS has proposed five names of potential mayoral candidates, namely the incumbent Deputy Mayor of Depok, Imam Budi Hartono; legislators of Depok, Farida Rahmayanti, Hafid Nasir, and Khairulloh; and bureaucrat Supian Suri. Over time, other names have emerged in the candidacy pool, including Gamal Albinsaid, Muhammad Kholid, and Imam Budi Hartono.The three potential candidates are PKS cadres. In the middle of the process, Gamal and Kholid did not continue their candidacy as mayoral candidates, considering that they were also participating in the general election as legislative candidates for the House of Representatives. However, the two were not withdrawn because the internal election process was ongoing.

When Gamal and Kholid finally withdrawn their candidacy, Imam Budi Hartono became the sole candidate from PKS to run as mayor. In internal party voting, Imam gained 81% of the votes while the two withdrawn candidates received 9% each. Imam was a legislator in the Depok Regional House of Representatives until 2009 and has since become a rising star on the provincial level. In 2015, he was named as one of the potential candidates to run for mayor and he stated his willingness to be nominated. His candidacy was backed by then-mayor Nur Mahmudi and then-Governor of West Java Ahmad Heryawan. Nur Mahmudi instead became the running mate for Mohammad Idris, who became the eventual candidate for mayor. On the 2020 Depok mayoral election, Imam was again named as a potential candidate but ultimately became Mohammad Idris' running mate.

In addition to Imam, another potential name is Farabi El Fouz from Golkar. Farabi was given a mandate by the party to run as a mayoral candidate in 2024. After that, Farabi withdrew from the mayoral nomination exchange. He nominated his wife, also a Golkar cadre, Ririn Farabi, to be nominated in the regional elections. Golkar then collaborated with PKS by nominating Imam as a mayoral candidate and Ririn as his deputy. Initially, Golkar planned to join together with their partners in the Advanced Indonesia Coalition to nominate Suprian Suri as a mayoral candidate, but ends up declaring for Imam. Another party, NasDem, who initially declared for Kaesang Pangarep as mayoral candidate also ends up supporting Imam and Ririn. Ririn was also named by PSI as a potential mayoral candidate. PKS has already broke off cooperation with PPP and Demokrat from Idris' previous coalition, the Coalition of Order, Fair, and Prosperous. Even so, PKS can actually nominate their own pair of candidates without the need to form a coalition with other parties. Meanwhile, PKS politician Engkur proposed the name Ahmad Syihan Ismail from the Nur Mahmudi Ismail as Imam's running mate.

The pair became the first candidates to be issued a letter of recommendation by a proposing party that political analyst Yusfitriadi from the Nusantara Vision Study Institute viewed that Imam's candidacy may have to challenge an empty ballot box. PKS became the first party to declare for the pair, followed by Golkar who issued their own letter on 1 August 2024. When their candidacy is accepted, Imam and Ririn declared a "soft launch" on their mayoral campaign at Cimanggis, Depok as the beginning of political cooperation ahead of the mayoral election while also confirming the coalition between PKS and Golkar. On that occasion, the pair echoed green politics in their speeches to convince voters by promising ecology that is synergized with development in Depok. Their nomination also confirmed the vision of sustainable development that had been pioneered since Nur Mahmudi's leadership, when he stated that public policy under his government would be in accordance with the policies of previous leaders.

2
Candidate from Gerindra and PDIP
Supian Suri	Chandra Rahmansyah
for Mayor	for Vice Mayor
Secretary of Depok (2021–2024)	MP candidate for Depok 6 in 2024
Parties
30 / 50 (60%) Gerindra (8 seats); PDIP (6 seats); PKB (5 seats); Demokrat (5 seats); PPP (2 seats); PAN (2 seats); PSI (1 seat); Nasdem (1 seat)

Former Deputy Mayor of Depok for the 2016–2021 term who is also the chairman of Gerindra in Depok, Pradi Supriatna ran as a legislative candidate in the 2024 legislative election and was successfully elected as a member of the West Java Regional House of Representatives representing the cities of Depok and Bekasi. After the legislative election, Pradi decided not to submit his candidacy as a candidate for Mayor of Depok after previously being a candidate for the same position with Afifah Alia in 2020. Apart from Pradi, two other names from Gerindra, namely Yeti Wulandari and Hamzah, are also potential candidates. Hamzah was endorsed by Ahmad Muzani after Prabowo-Gibran won in Depok during the 2024 Indonesian presidential election. Potential candidates who entered the nomination exchange were responded positively by Gerindra. In the end, Pradi handed over his candidacy to a civil servant in the Depok City Government, Supian Suri. Supian's name was proposed when he was still holding the position of regional secretary. Supian's candidacy is reacted positively by the Labour Party.

Supian's name was previously proposed by PDI-P to accompany the son of the 7th President of Indonesia Joko Widodo, Kaesang Pangarep. At that time, he had not yet decided to contest in the political arena. To start the nomination, Supian submitted supporting documents as a prospective mayoral candidate for the first time to the National Mandate Party (PAN) on April 26, 2024, followed by the National Awakening Party (PKB), the United Development Party (PPP), and the Democratic Party. PPP had given their letter of recommendation to Supian on 13 June 2024. Supian has also submitted his candidacy to Gerindra. The four parties approved his nomination in the mayoral election, followed by PDI-P and PSI. The nominating parties then formed a grand coalition and called the coalition as the Together Coalition (Indonesian: Koalisi Sama-Sama) with the acronym of SS, a similar acronym used by Supian. The coalition's name also rhymes with its slogan, Building Depok Together.

After the coalition was formed and his candidacy was convincing, Supian submitted a request to the city government to temporarily resign from his job as a civil servant and also to resign from his position as regional secretary and commissioner at the Regional Drinking Water Company under the auspices of the Depok City Government. Idris approved Supian's temporary leave on June 1, 2024 and he only received leave two days after signing. When the decision letter was handed over to him, Supian prepared his documents in preparation of his campaign. Before being accepted, the state facilities he used during his service were withdrawn by the government. In fact, he was not allowed to ask permission from the civil servants in his ranks. As his replacement at the regional secretariat, the government appointed Nina Suzana, the daughter of Naming Djamhari Bothin who worked in the government. His advancement as a mayoral candidate made him one of the regional secretaries who contested in the regional head elections in Indonesia and became the only regional secretary to temporarily resign from his position.

On his running mate, PDI-P gave Supian prerogative rights to choose his own running mate. Regional Representative Council Senator Alfiansyah Komeng was included in Supian's consideration as running mate. Other names included Ririn Farabi from Golkar, Yeti Wulandari from Gerindra and Intan Fauzi from PAN. PAN initially proposed Hasbullah Rahmad as a candidate for mayor. However, on the recommendation of PAN chairman Zulkifli Hasan, PAN finally proposed the name Intan Fitriana Fauzi, a member from the House of Representatives. The coalition reacted convincingly to make the pair possible. The pairing was proposed to Gerindra's party council to be formalized. At the end of July 2024, the coalition nominated Chandra Rachmansyah as Supian's running mate. Intan Fauzi was skipped due to media's speculation of a possible appointment by president-elect Prabowo Subianto as a deputy minister. Intan however denied this rumor and formally backed the pairing. Previously, Chandra was not even being considered in any opinion polling by several polling institutions. As a candidate, Chandra promoted youth politics and populism by raising the issue of unemployment to convince voters. These activities are in relation to his background as an entrepreneur.

On early August 2024, Babai from PKB who acted as a spokesperson of the coalition announced that the Together Coalition has changed its name to Change for Advanced Depok Coalition. This is in line with the vision brought by this pair about progressivism and transformation, and progress. They claim that the name change was proposed by elements of society. The change of the coalition name occurred before a series of joint declarations were carried out to carry Supian Suri and his deputy. The coalition initially agreed to the declaration on August 9, 2024.

=== Potential ===
The following are individuals who have either been publicly mentioned as a potential candidate by a political party in the DPRD, publicly declared their candidacy with press coverage, or considered as a potential candidate by media outlets:

- Kaesang Pangarep (PSI), chairman of the Indonesian Solidarity Party, youngest son of president Joko Widodo and younger brother to vice president-elect Gibran Rakabuming Raka.

=== Declined ===
The following are individuals who have either been publicly mentioned as a potential candidate by a political party in the DPRD, but declined to run:

- Pradi Supriatna, Deputy Mayor of Depok (2016–2021)

== Political map ==
Following the 2024 Indonesian general election, ten political parties are represented in the Depok Regional House of Representatives:

Political parties	Seat count
Prosperous Justice Party (PKS)	13 / 50
Great Indonesia Movement Party (Gerindra)	8 / 50
Party of Functional Groups (Golkar)	7 / 50
Indonesian Democratic Party of Struggle (PDI-P)	6 / 50
National Awakening Party (PKB)	5 / 50
Democratic Party (Demokrat)	5 / 50
United Development Party (PPP)	2 / 50
National Mandate Party (PAN)	2 / 50
NasDem Party	1 / 50
Indonesian Solidarity Party (PSI)	1 / 50

== Results ==
Candidate	Running mate	Party	Votes	%
Supian Suri	Chandra Rahmansyah	Gerindra Party	451,785	53.24
Imam Budi Hartono	Ririn Farabi Ahmad Rafiq	Prosperous Justice Party	396,863	46.76
Total			848,648	100.00
Valid votes			848,648	96.33
Invalid/blank votes			32,364	3.67
Total votes			881,012	100.00
Registered voters/turnout			1,427,674	61.71
Source: KPU
