= Mohamed Idris =

Mohamed Idris may refer to:

- Mohamed Younis Idris, Sudanese athlete
- Mohamed Idris (Ethiopian politician)
- S. M. Mohamed Idris, Malaysian advocate of consumer rights, environmental protection, and worker's rights
- Mohammed Idris Alkali, Nigerian major general
- Mohammed Idris, Bengali politician

== See also ==
- Mohammad Idris (disambiguation)
