= Mohammad Idris =

Mohammad Idris may refer to:

- Mohammad Idris (Indonesian politician)
- Mohammad Idris Shakur (Bangladeshi politician)
- Mohammad Idris (Indian politician)
- Mohammed Idris, Benagli politician

== See also ==
- Dewan Mohammad Idris (1920–1990), Bangladesh Nationalist Party politician
- Haji Mohammad Idris, former Governor of the Afghanistan Central Bank
- Mohammed Idris Alkali, Nigerian Major general
- Mohamed Idris (disambiguation)
