= Supian Suri =

Indonesian politician (born 1975)

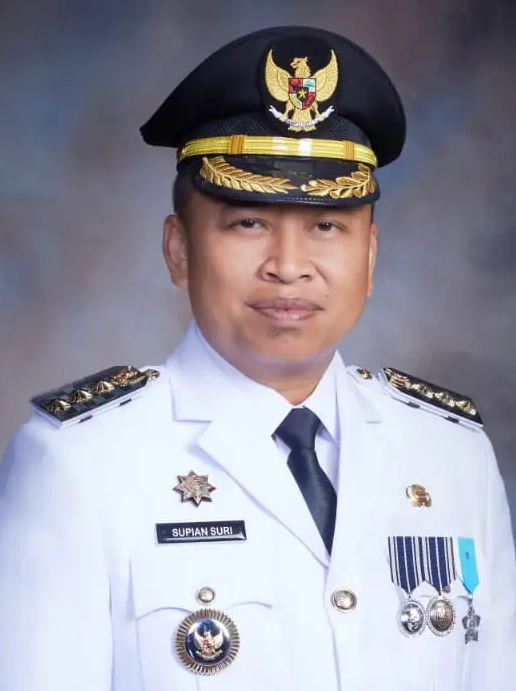
- Official portrait, 2025

4th Mayor of Depok
- Incumbent
- Assumed office 20 February 2025
- Governor: Dedi Mulyadi
- Deputy: Chandra Rahmansyah
- Preceded by: Mohammad Idris

Regional Secretary of Depok
- In office 22 July 2021 – 1 June 2024
- Mayor: Mohammad Idris
- Preceded by: Hardiono; Sri Utomo (act)
- Succeeded by: Nina Suzana (act); Mangnguluang Mansur

Personal details
- Born: 27 February 1975 (age 51) Bogor, West Java, Indonesia
- Party: Gerindra
- Spouse: Siti Barkah Hasanah (m. 2004)
- Education: IPDN

Supian Suri (born 27 February 1975) is an Indonesian politician of the Gerindra Party and bureaucrat who is the mayor of Depok, West Java, serving since February 2025. He was previously regional secretary of the city in 2021–2024.

== Early life ==
Supian Suri was born on 27 February 1975 at the village of Kalimulya, today part of Depok but then within Bogor Regency, to Mohammad Ali and Lani Nihayati. Ali was the village head of Kalimulya from 1977 and 1995. After completing elementary school at Kalimulya in 1989, Supian completed middle school in Cibinong and high school in Bogor. He then studied at the Institute of Domestic Governance in Sumedang, receiving a diploma in 1999 and a bachelor's in local government finances in 2002.

== Career ==
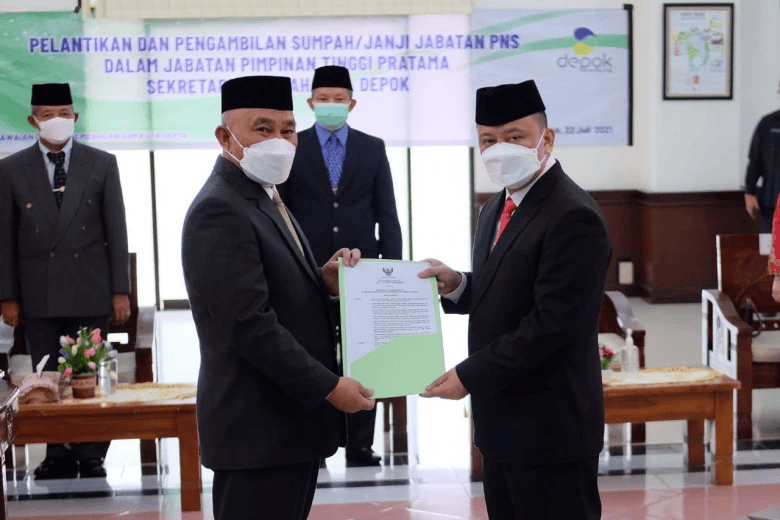
Supian (right) being sworn as city secretary in 2021.

Supian began to work for the municipal government of Bekasi in 1999. In 2000, due to a request from his father, Supian moved to Depok's municipal government, and he became an adjutant to the city's vice-mayor. Within Depok's city government, he would become head of several urban villages (kelurahan), and by 2017 he was head of the municipal government's human resources department. He headed other departments within the city before he was appointed city secretary on 22 July 2021 by mayor Mohammad Idris.

In 2024, Supian resigned from his city secretary position in order to run in Depok's mayoral election. He had been discussing a bid since 2022, holding discussions with the Gerindra party, which he joined following his resignation as city secretary. Supian received support from a coalition of eight parties with members in Depok's municipal legislature and four parties without. His running mate was Chandra Rahmansyah from the National Awakening Party. In the election, he won 451,785 votes (53.24%) and defeated Imam Budi Hartono, the incumbent vice-mayor from the Prosperous Justice Party (PKS). Supian's victory marked the end of 20 years of PKS mayors in Depok.

Supian and Rahmansyah were sworn in as mayor and vice-mayor on 20 February 2025. Early in his term, he announced several priority programs, which included the removal of property taxes for small units, the establishment of a heritage area in the city's old town, and the repairing of toilets in state-owned schools in the city. In April 2025, he announced that city employees would be permitted to use their official cars to go on Mudik trips, which resulted in Supian receiving a reprimand from West Java governor Dedi Mulyadi. Following the establishment for a military training program for misbehaving teenagers by Mulyadi, Supian announced a similar program for Depok in May 2025.

== Personal life ==
Supian is married to Siti Barkah Hasanah, and the couple has two children.
