= Badrul Kamal =

Indonesian politician (1945–2026)

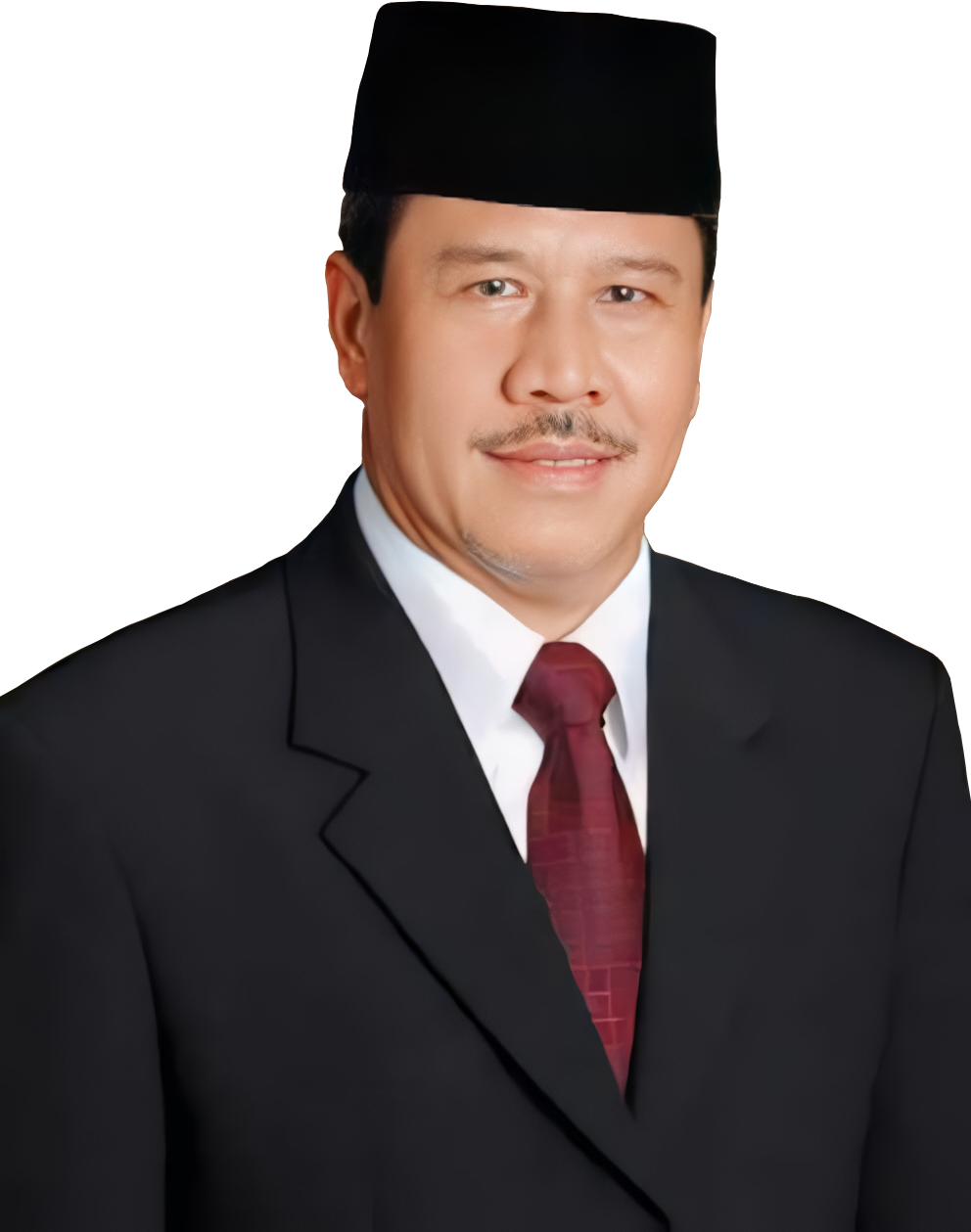
- Kamal in 2010

1st Mayor of Depok
- In office 15 March 2000 – 15 March 2005; Acting from 27 April 1999
- Preceded by: Himself (as administrative mayor)
- Succeeded by: Nur Mahmudi Ismail

6th Administrative Mayor of Depok
- In office 31 October 1997 – 27 April 1999
- Preceded by: Yuyun Wirasaputra (act.)
- Succeeded by: Himself (as mayor)

Personal details
- Born: 20 December 1945 Bogor, West Java, Indonesia
- Died: 9 November 2026 (aged 80) Jakarta, Indonesia
- Party: Golkar (until 1998, 2000–2010)

Badrul Kamal (20 December 1945 – 9 November 2026) was an Indonesian politician and civil servant. He served as the first mayor of Depok upon the city's formation in 1999 and served until 2005, after previously heading Depok's administration between 1997 and 1999 while it was an administrative city. He unsuccessfully ran for a second term in 2005 and 2010.

== Early life ==
Badrul Kamal was born in Ciawi district of Bogor Regency in West Java, on 20 December 1945. He was a son of Yahya Sudja'i and Siti Djuariah. Kamal studied at public schools in Bogor Regency, completing high school in 1966 before enrolling at the Academy of Home Affairs Administration (Akademi Pemerintahan Dalam Negeri/APDN) in Bandung. He graduated from APDN in 1970. In 1999, he obtained a master's in management from Satyagama University.

== Career ==
After graduating from APDN, Kamal began to work for the municipal government of Bogor Regency, initially as municipal police officer at Cigudeg district. By 1972, he was appointed the district head (camat) of Cigudeg, and by 1973 Kamal was camat of Ciawi. He held this post until 1982, when he was appointed to developmental roles in the main municipal government office. His last post outside of Depok was assistant for developmental administration, starting in 1991.

=== Mayor of Depok ===
On 31 October 1997, Kamal was appointed mayor of the administrative city of Depok by Bogor's regent. The office had been vacant for some time at the time of Kamal's appointment. He was the sixth and final person to hold the office. On 27 April 1999, Depok was upgraded to a full city, and Kamal continued to serve as the city's acting mayor. According to Kamal in a 2009 interview, he proposed splitting up Depok's districts from three to six upon hearing the news of the municipal status change, citing developmental needs.

In 2000, Kamal was elected by Depok's city council as mayor with 33 votes out of 45, and he was sworn in on 15 March 2000. At the time, he was a member of the Golkar party. During his mayoral term, Kamal initiated the project of a new thoroughfare for Depok (Margonda Street) and began acquiring the land needed for the project, although construction did not commence until after his term ended. His tenure also saw the establishment of Depok's new public hospital (also completed in his successor's term). In 2004, he was examined as a witness following a corruption case which implicated much of Depok's city councillors.

=== Elections ===
Following the end of his first term, Kamal took part in Depok's first direct mayoral election in 2005, with Nur Mahmudi Ismail as his opponent. Kamal received the endorsement of Golkar and the National Awakening Party in the election. The city's electoral commission announced Ismail's victory in the election, with 232,610 votes to Kamal's 204,828. Kamal filed a lawsuit, and the West Java High Court revised the electoral results in Kamal's favor (269,551 Kamal votes to 204,828 Ismail votes). Ismail appealed to the Supreme Court of Indonesia, which reversed the high court's decision and sanctioned the ruling judge while confirming Ismail's victory.

In 2010, Kamal again ran for Depok's mayoral office, and again lost to Ismail who secured his second term. Kamal and two other candidates filed another lawsuit against the election's result, which was rejected by the Constitutional Court of Indonesia.

== Personal life and death ==
Kamal was married to Yuliesda, and the couple had three children. Kamal was also an in-law of West Java governor Danny Setiawan. He was active in scouting organizations in the city, later becoming an advisor for the organization in Bogor and Depok.

Kamal died from lung cancer at the Persahabatan Hospital in East Jakarta, on 9 November 2026, at the age of 80. He was buried the following day at his family's grave in Ciawi, Bogor Regency.
