= 2020 Depok mayoral election =

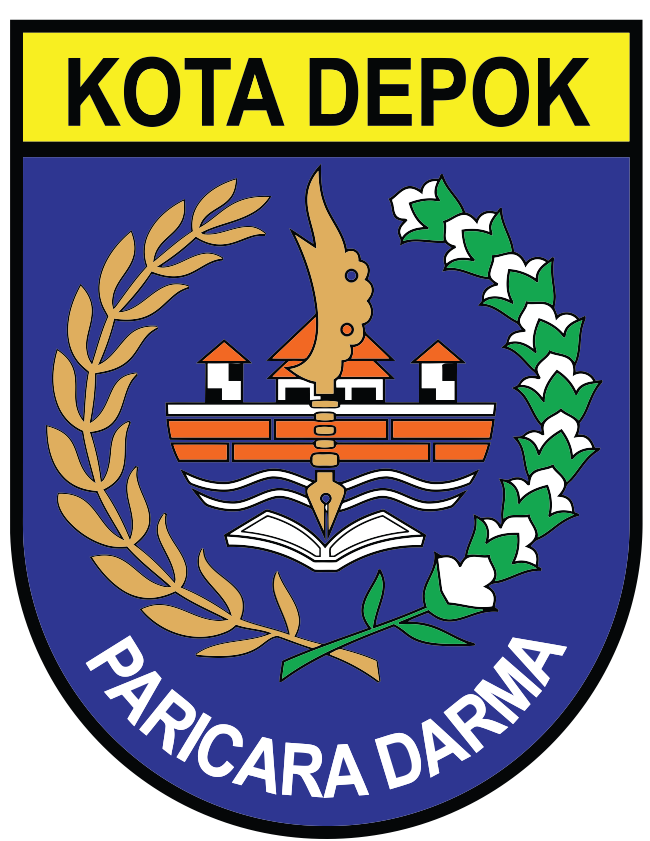
- 9 December 2020
- Registered: 1,240,448
- Turnout: 777,737 (63.26%)
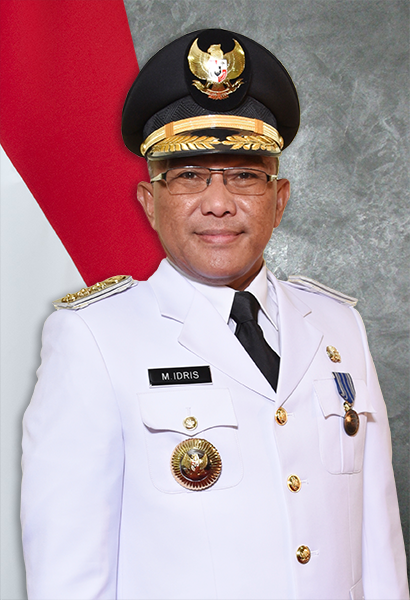

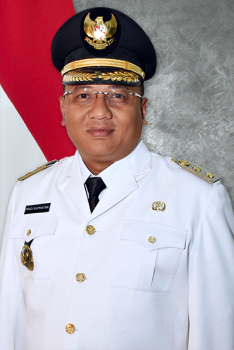

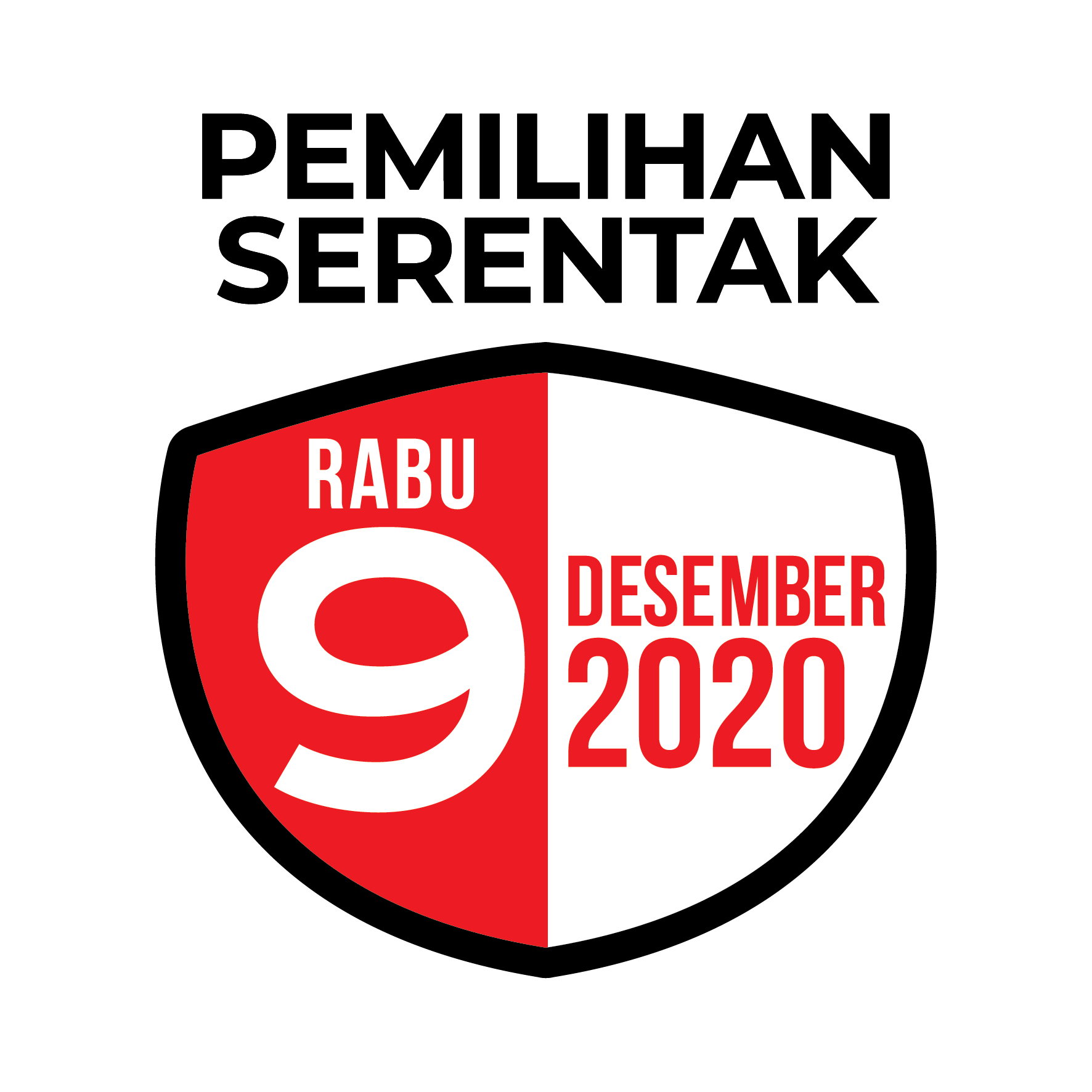

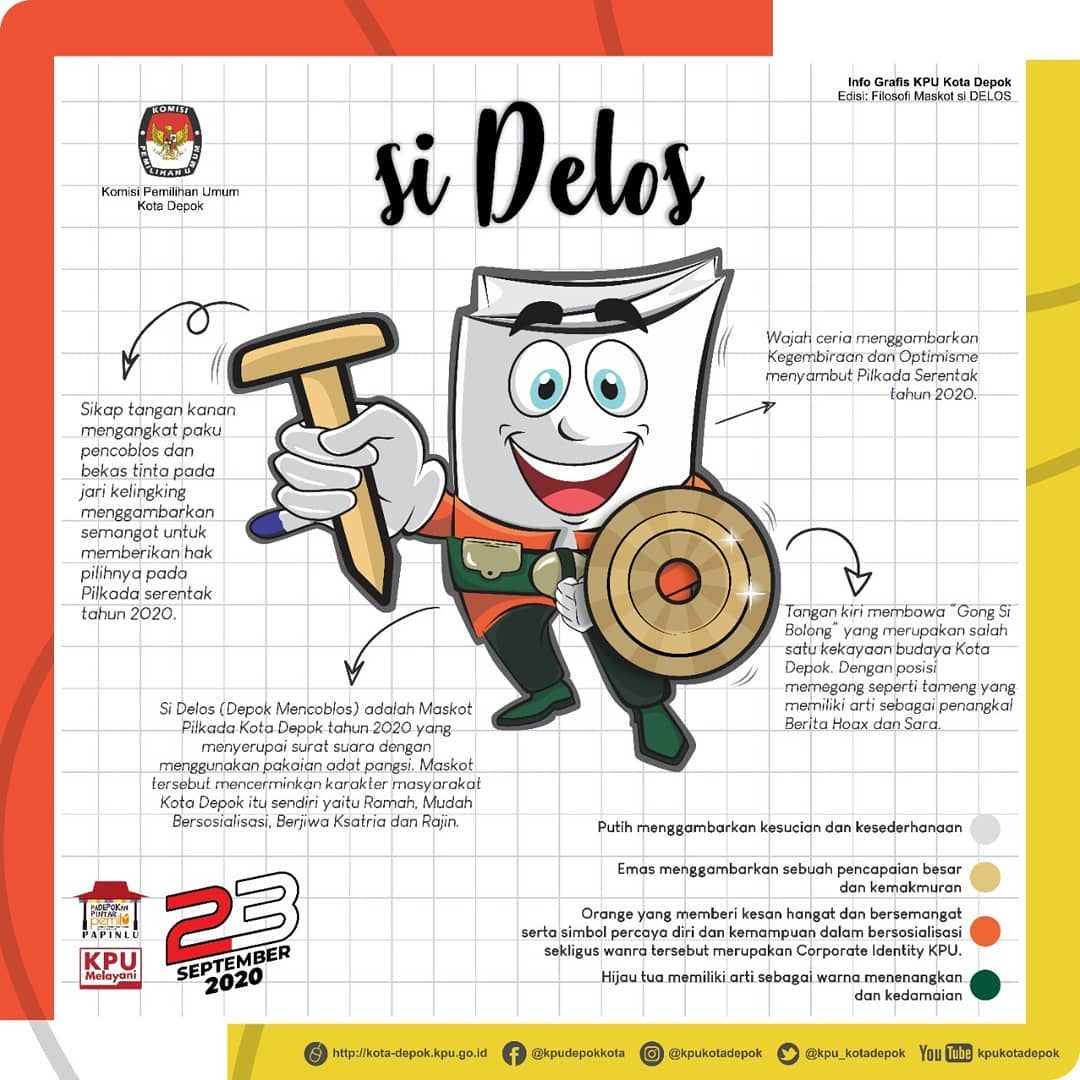
Candidate	Mohammad Idris	Pradi Supriatna
Party	PKS	Gerindra
Alliance	Koalisi Tertata Adil Sejahtera (Note: Including Prosperous Justice Party, the Democratic Party (Indonesia), the United Development Party and the Berkarya Party.)	Koalisi Depok Bangkit (Note: Including Gerindra, the PDI-P, Golkar, the National Awakening Party, the PSI, the Perindo, the Nasdem, the People's Conscience Party, the Crescent Star Party (Indonesia), the PKPI, the Garuda Party and the Gelora.)
Running mate	Imam Budi Hartono	Afifah Alia
Popular vote	415,657	332,689
Percentage	55.54%	44.46%
Logo
Mascot
- Results map by subdistrict and district (Interactive version)
Mayor before election
Mohammad Idris
Independent
Elected mayor
Mohammad Idris
Independent

2020 Depok mayoral election is the general election to elect the Mayor and Deputy Mayor of Depok for the period 2021 – 2024. This election was held by the Depok City Election Commission (KPU) which was held on December 9, 2020.

== Background ==
This election is the fourth regional head election which is conducted directly elected by the community. Mohammad Idris who was elected as mayor in the 2015 election can apply for re-nomination as Mayor of Depok in this election. In addition, the Mayor and Deputy Mayor of Depok applied for 71 days of leave from 26 September 2020 to 5 December 2020. Thus, the Governor of West Java Ridwan Kamil appointed the Head of the West Java Provincial Education Office, Dedi Supandi as the Acting Mayor of Depok.

=== Election ===
Regional General Elections Commission (KPUD) Depok City increased the number of polling stations (TPS) due to the quota limiting the maximum quota for the number of voters in each TPS, which is 500 peoples. Initially, the TPS had 3,417 places, but the number of TPS became 4,015 places. The determination of the voter quota made the number of TPS in Depok City increase by 598 points or around 17.5 percent. Included in the ballot box are 4,049 boxes. and ballot papers totaling 2,262,051 sheets or an increase of 2.5% as a reserve from the number of the Final Voters List (DPT), meanwhile, the number of damaged ballots was 137 and had been replaced by the ballot provider. A total of 16,060 voting booths have also been prepared in each polling station (TPS). The ballot boxes and voting booths are then stored in the KPUD warehouse in Depok City in Tugu, Cimanggis, Depok. In fact, the KPUD of Depok City is willing to go to COVID-19 patients to be able to exercise their voting rights. The voters who became COVID-19 patients totaled 2,280 people with details of 1,280 patients being treated in hospital and 1,152 people who were doing self-isolation or people without symptoms.

==== Date ====
The central government with DPR RI agreed to change the agenda simultaneous regional head elections in 2020 and set a date for simultaneous elections on 9 December 2020 after previously being postponed on 23 September 2020 due to COVID-19 pandemic. There are three election date options in delaying the simultaneous regional elections, namely 9 December 2020 with pre-voting Pilkada stages at the end of May 2020, 17 March 2021, and 29 September 2021.

President Joko Widodo emphasized the Presidential Decree of the Republic of Indonesia Number 22 of 2020 concerning Voting Day for the Election of Governors and Deputy Governors, Regents and Deputy Regents, as well as Mayors and Deputy Mayors in 2020, the election date is declared on December 9, 2020 national holidays. Continuing this decision, the Depok City Government also issued Mayor Circular Letter Number 270/581-ORB, concerning Depok City Head Election (Pilkada) Day 9 December 2020 as a holiday.

== Nomination ==
The following are the pairs of nominees that have been appointed as candidates for mayor and deputy mayor by the Depok City Regional General Election Commission (KPUD) on September 23, 2020:

Candidate; 1
Pradi Supriatna	Afifah Alia
Candidate for mayor	Candidate for deputy mayor
Deputy Mayor of Depok (2016–present); Chairman of Gerindra Depok City (2010–present)	Chairman of Baitul Muslimin Indonesia, Depok City (2019–present); Candidate Member of DPR RI 2019
Campaign

Candidate; 2
Mohammad Idris	Imam Budi Hartono
Candidate for mayor	Candidate for deputy mayor
Mayor of Depok (2016–present); Deputy Mayor of Depok (2011–2016)	Members of DPRD of West Java (2009–2014, 2018–2020); Members of DPRD of Depok City (1999–2009)
Campaign

== Political Map ==
=== Parliamentary Chairs ===
Results of 2019 Indonesian general election in Depok City there were 9 Political Parties with a total of 50 seats in Depok City People's Representative Council, namely:

Political parties	Amount		
Political parties	Chairs	%	▲ ▼ (2014)
Prosperous Justice Party (PKS)	12 / 50	24.0%	▲6
Great Indonesia Movement Party (Gerindra)	10 / 50	20.0%	▲9
Indonesian Democratic Party of Struggle (PDI-P)	10 / 50	20.0%	▼11
Party of Functional Groups (Golkar)	5 / 50	10.0%	5
National Mandate Party (PAN)	4 / 50	8.0%	▼6
Democratic Party (Demokrat)	3 / 50	6.0%	▼5
National Awakening Party (PKB)	3 / 50	6.0%	▲1
United Development Party (PPP)	2 / 50	4.0%	▼4
Indonesian Solidarity Party (PSI)	1 / 50	2.0%	New

=== Alliance ===
In this election, there are two camps that will carry candidates for mayor and deputy mayor candidates, including the Gerindra & PDI-P agreed to support the mayor candidate who came from the Gerindra Party, while the Deputy Mayor's candidate came from the PDI-P and the four parties that agreed to build the Depok Organized Coalition on 1 February 2020.

== Survey Results ==
=== After Candidacy ===
Survey Institute	Date	Samples	Pradi-Afifah	Idris-Imam	others
DEEP (source)	15 - 30 September 2020	582	42,2	36,4	14,4%
DEEP (source)	24 October - 4 November 2020	2.684	49,6	47,8	2,6%
DEEP (source)	29 November - 2 December 2020	800	60,0	31,0	9,0%
LSVN (source)	1 - 4 December 2020	800	45,0	35,0	20,0%

=== Before Candidacy ===
==== Candidate for Mayor ====
Figure	Survey			
Figure	Klinik Digital Vokasi Universitas Indonesia	Jaring Suara Indonesia	Masyarakat Madani Peduli Depok	Radar Depok
Mohammad Idris	12.0	26.6	—	17.83
Alya Rohali	—	—	24.6	—
Pradi Supriatna	10.0	14.3	—	19.17
Imam Budi Hartono	3.0	—	18.7	—
Iwan Fals	13.0	—	—	—
Farabi El Fouz	—	—	—	8.07
Hardiono	—	—	8.0	—
Qonita Lutfiah	—	—	7.5	—
Acep Azhari	—	—	7.5	—
Nuroji	4.0	—	—	—
Ahmad Riza Alhabsyi	—	4.0	—	—
Hendrik Tangke Allo	3.0	—	—	—
Babai Suhaimi	3.0	—	—	—
Respondents	2,800	440	658	150–200
Date	14 September 2019	21–27 November 2019	16–19 December 2019	26 February 2020

==== Candidate for Deputy Mayor ====
Date	Source	Yeti	Farida	Qonita	Afifah	Respondents
26 February 2020	Klinik Digital Vokasi Universitas Indonesia	11.55	6.46	5.89	3.06	150–200

== Results ==
=== Quick Count ===
Source / Institute	Candidate		Sample	Grafic
Source / Institute	Pradi-Afifah	Idris-Imam	Sample	Grafic
Voxpol Centre	46,64%	53,35%	93,57%	

=== Official Results ===
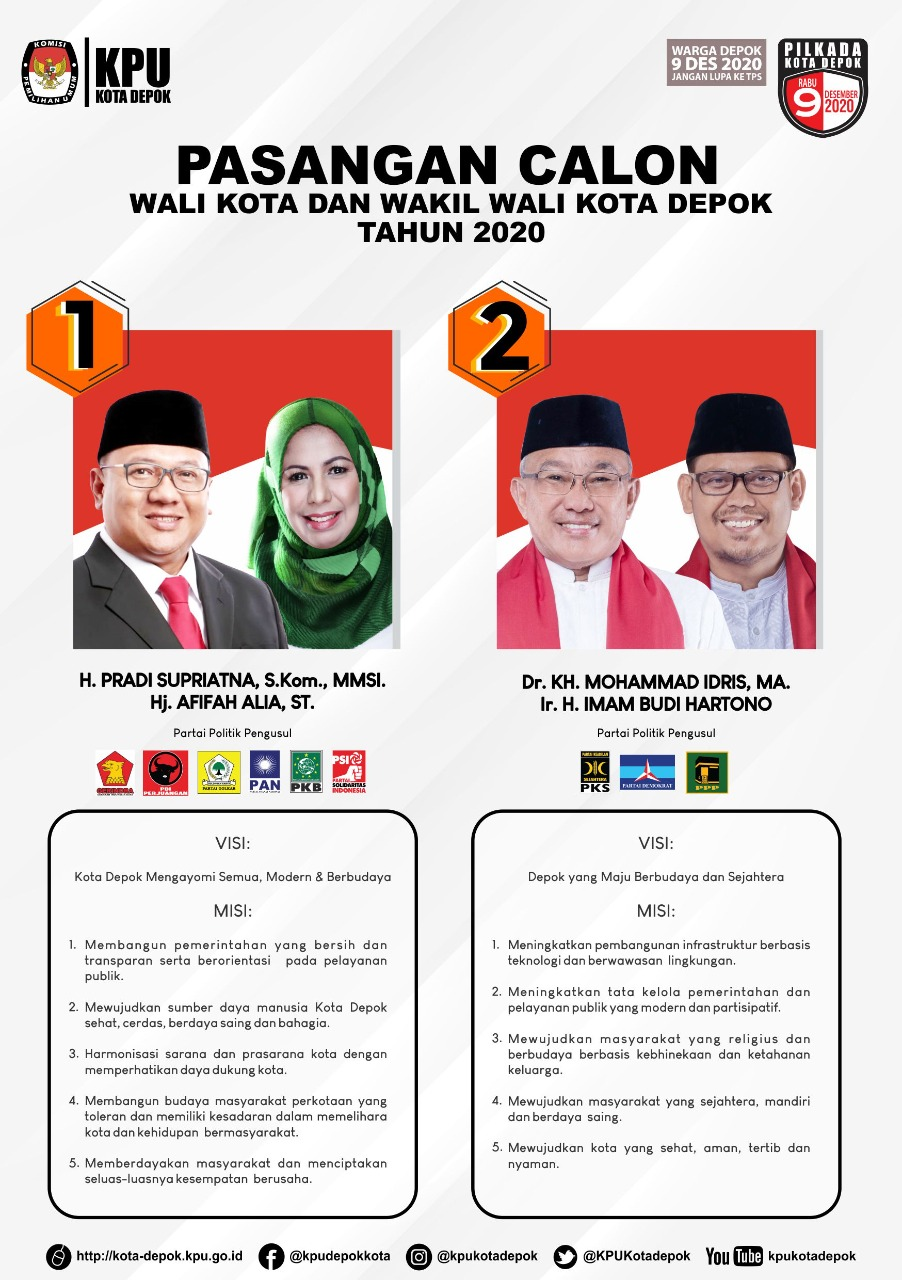
Poster for 2020 Mayor and Deputy Mayor of Depok Candidates

Summary of 9 December 2020 Depok mayoral election result
Candidate	Running mate	Parties	Votes	%
Pradi Supriatna	Afifah Alia	Great Indonesia Movement Party	332,689	44.46
Mohammad Idris	Imam Budi Hartono	Prosperous Justice Party	415,657	55.54
Total			748,346	100.00
Valid votes			748,346	60.87
Spoilt and null votes			29,391	2.39
Turnout			777,737	63.26
Abstentions			481,016	39.12
Registered voters			1,240,448	
Source: KPU

Votes by district					Total votes	Grafic
Votes by district	Pradi Supriatna Gerindra		Mohammad Idris PKS		Total votes	Grafic
Votes by district	Votes	%	Votes	%	Total votes	Grafic
Beji	29,238	47,10	32,781	52,90	62,019	
Bojongsari	17,560	34,70	33,036	65,30	50,596	
Cilodong	24,194	40,80	35,048	59,20	59,242	
Cimanggis	35,719	42,70	47,983	57,30	83,702	
Cinere	12,704	44,20	16,038	55,80	28,742	
Cipayung	27,602	44,80	34,006	55,20	61,608	
Limo	21,007	53,20	18,454	46,80	39,461	
Pancoran Mas	46,732	48,0	50,471	52,0	97,203	
Sawangan	31,794	45,0	38,730	55,0	70,524	
Sukmajaya	42,499	45,60	50,630	54,40	93,129	
Tapos	43,640	42,70	58,480	57,30	102,120	
Total	332,689	44,46	415,657	55,54	748,346	
Source: KPU

== Gallery ==
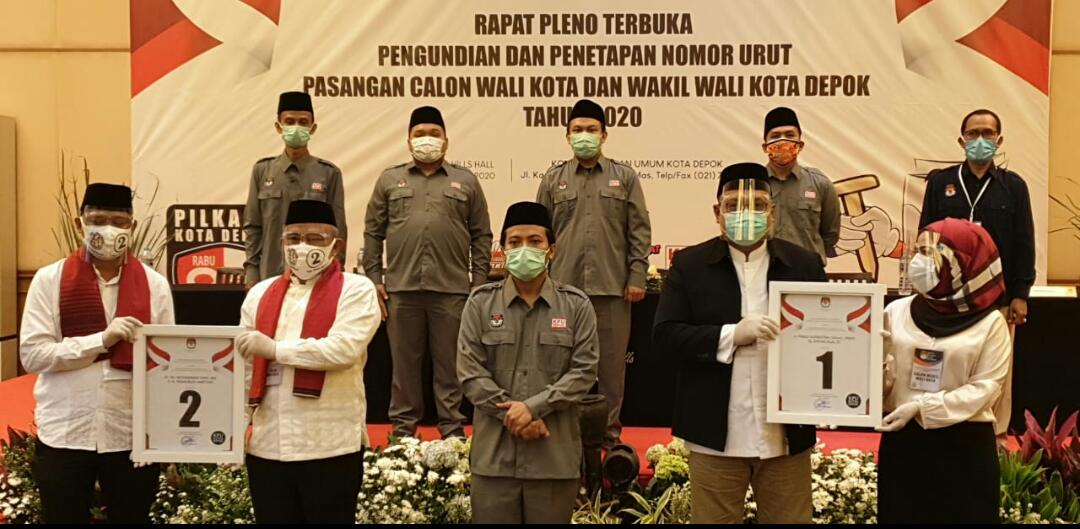
Determination of Serial Number of Candidate Pairs

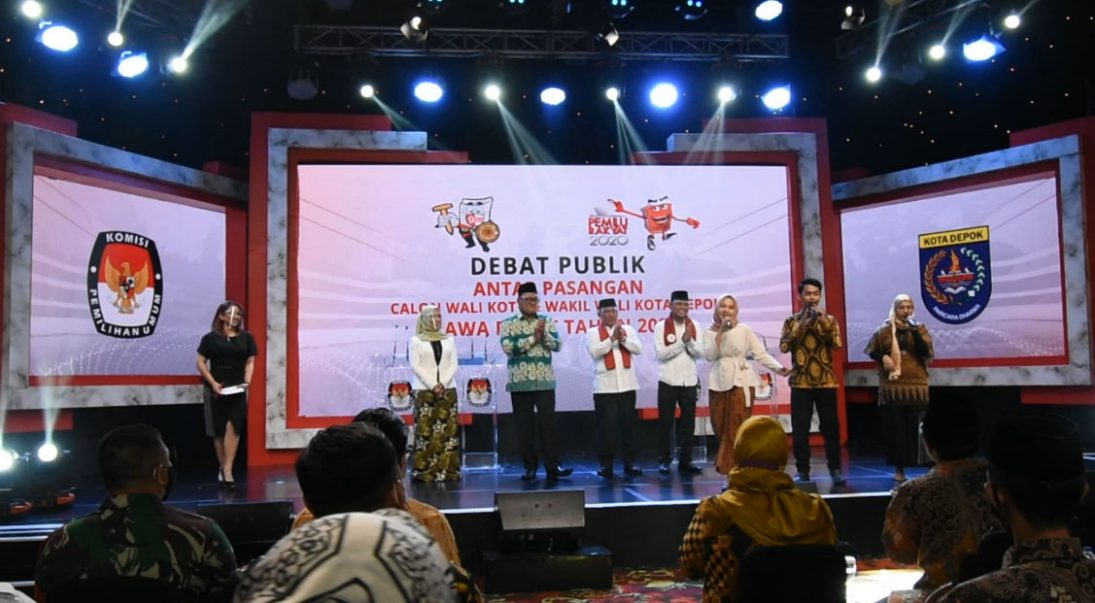
First Debate on 22 November 2020

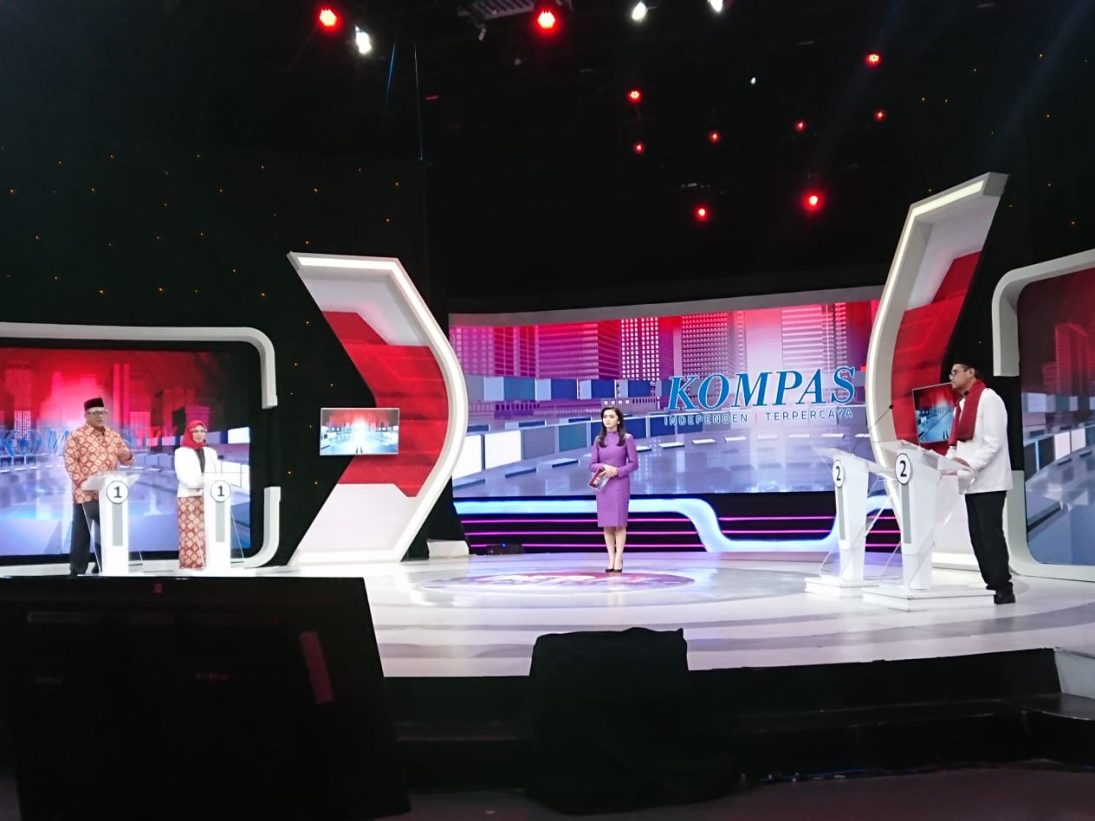
Second Debate on 30 November 2020

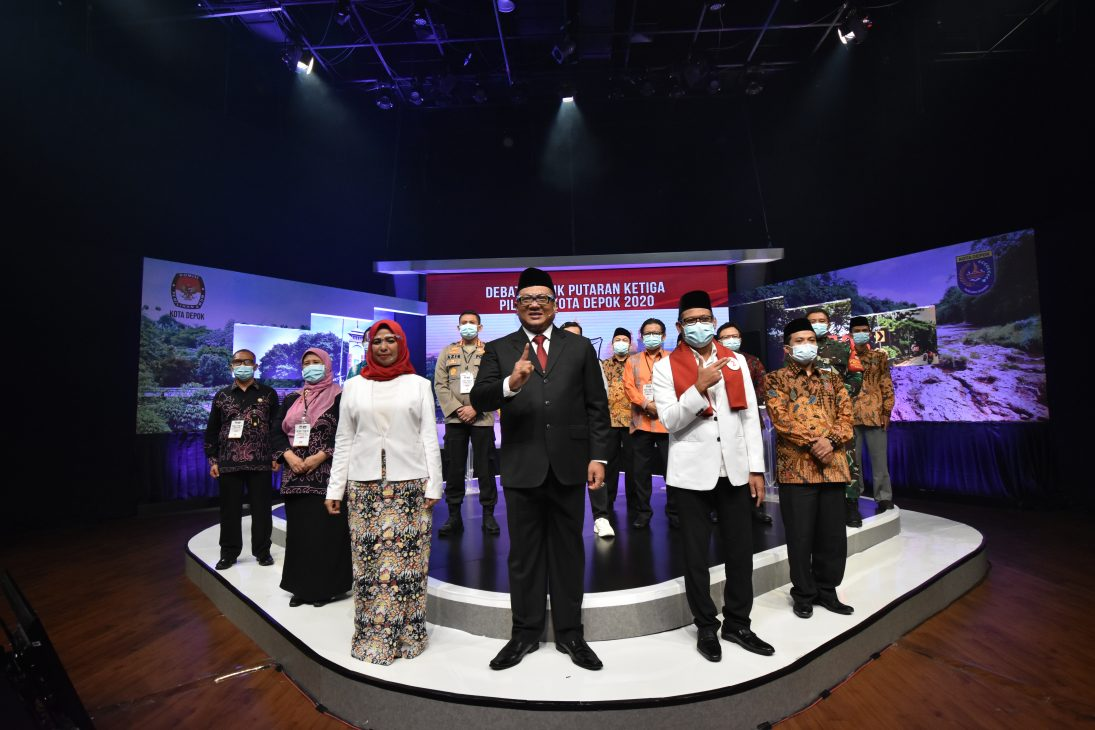
Third Debate on 4 December 2020
