= Idris Alkali =

Nigerian army major general

Major general Idris Alkali
- Nickname: Nuri
- Born: Mohammed Idris Alkali
- Allegiance: Nigeria
- Branch: Nigerian Army
- Service years: 1983–2018
- Rank: Major general
- Education: Nigerian Defence Academy
- Buried: Gudu Cemetery, Abuja, Nigeria

Mohammed Idris Alkali (1960–2018), also known as Nuri, was a Nigerian retired Major general who was declared missing on 3 September 2018 and found dead on 31 October 2018. It would later be revealed after investigations that he was ambushed and killed by a group of angry mob along JOS bypass in Plateau state. During his military career, he served as the Chief of Administration, Army Headquarters, Abuja.

== Early life and education ==
Mohammed Idris Alkali was from Potiskum, Yobe State, Nigeria. He started his education at Central Primary School, Potiskum.

== Career ==
On commission, Alkali was posted to Infantry Corps and was later redeployed to the Intelligence Corps. He was of the 34th Regular Course. On 28 June 1986, he was granted regular combatant commission in the rank of second lieutenant with seniority in the same rank from 4 July 1983. Alkali was of the Nigeria Army Armour Corps and became a major general in 2014. He has served as commandant of the Nigerian Army Armour School, commander of the Armour Corps Headquarters, director of veteran affairs Defence Headquarters Directorate and chief of administration, Army Headquarters, Abuja. Alkali retired from the Nigerian Army on 7 August 2018 after 35 years of service.

== Assault and killing of Idris Alkali ==
=== Assault and killing ===
On 2 September 2018, unknown gunmen attacked a shopping complex at Lafande community, Dura-Du district, Jos South, Plateau State. During the course of the attack, eleven people were killed, while several others were injured. Due to the attack, residents of the area started a protest the following morning. The protesters mostly youths, barricaded the roads during the protest and on the same morning, Alkali was traveling on his Toyota Corolla car to his farm without his driver and orderly, he traveled from Abuja to Bauchi State through the Jos road. The general was stopped and after he introduced himself, he was attacked and killed by the protesters, while his phones, cash and laptop were stolen.

=== Investigation and arrest ===
On 5 September 2018, wife of Alkali, Salamatu Alkali raised an alarm and drew the attention of the Nigerian Army over the disappearance of her husband. According to the wife, the husband called her during the course of his journey and claimed he had passed Jos and was on his way to Bauchi State. Reacting to the disappearance, the Nigerian Army contacted MTN and GLO networks, requesting for the general's call records. In the course of the investigation, his phone was tracked to Du district. The army headquarters then directed the headquarters 3 division in Rukuba, Bassa, Plateau State headed by Garrison Commander 3 Armoured Division, Brigadier general Umar Muhammad to conduct a search and rescue operation in Dura-Du District to find the retired general dead or alive. The army headquarters tasked the search and rescue team to find the vehicle of the general and if he has been killed, they should find and prosecute those responsible. When the operation was ongoing, issues of indiscriminate arrests and detention, unprofessional conduct, human rights abuses and harassment and intimidation were raised and the Nigerian army denied any wrongdoing. The search and rescue team collaborated with Operation Safe Haven, Nigerian Police Force, State Fire Service and local divers during the operation.

On 20 September 2018, the team said that intelligence has revealed that Alkali's car was dumped in an abandoned mining pit in Dura. When the team made attempts to evacuate water from the pit, the residents, all women dressed in black began a protest seeking to stop them from draining the water from the pond. The women protesters in their hundreds claimed that the evacuation of the water from the pond would spiritually affect their children, making them fall sick and leading to the death of their husbands. The team ignored the protesters and proceeded to drain the water.

After two weeks of draining the water from the pond, the general's car, a blood-stained customized white t-shirt with Nigerian Army logo and the general's name inscribed on it and a pair of canvass shoes belonging to the general were found in the car, alongside other two vehicles on 29 September 2018, while the search for his body continued. On 3 October 2018, few days after the general's car was found, thirty suspects, including a pregnant woman were arrested in Dura-Du district by the army and kept at Rukuba barracks, after which they were handed over to the police after interrogation. On 17 October 2018, thirteen of the suspects were paraded by the army and subsequently handed over to the police. The army disclosed that some of the thirteen suspects handed over to the police, were in possession of firearms without licence and others heard and saw the criminals that attacked the general without reporting it to the security agencies.

On 21 October 2018, the police declared a further eight suspects wanted after a thorough interrogation with the thirteen suspects. Through further investigation, on 26 October 2018, the army revealed that the arrested suspects had given credible information which led them to an open shallow grave in a place called "No man's land" in the same community where Alkali's body was buried initially, according to the investigation, the body was later exhumed when his car was discovered. On 31 October 2018, Alkali's lifeless body was recovered from an abandoned well in Guchwet, Shen, Jos South, after the water was drained with a water pump generator to allow access to his body parts.

On 3 November 2018, the remains of the general was buried at Gudu Cemetery in Abuja in accordance with Islamic rites. On 4 November 2018, nineteen suspects were paraded by the police. The nineteen paraded suspects include the thirteen earlier handed over to the police by the army and a further six that were among the eight suspects declared wanted on 21 October 2018. According to the police, two out of the eight suspects that were declared wanted, failed to report themselves to the command. On 10 January 2019, after further investigations, the police declared more 13 suspects wanted. The suspects were consisting of twelve males from Dwei village in Du district and one other male from Gushen village, Jos South.

=== Legal process ===
On 5 November 2018, the nineteen suspects were arraigned by the police on a two-count charge bordering on criminal conspiracy and culpable homicide before Justice Daniel Longjin at the State High Court 5, Jos. After the charges were read to the suspects, they all pleaded not guilty and the judge thereafter adjourned the case till 10 December 2018 for hearing, while remanding the suspects in Jos prison. On 7 November 2018, the accused filed their bail application before the judge. At the resumed hearing of the case on 10 December 2018, Plateau State Government applied and took over the case, while praying the court to grant them time to enable them to study the case file. The judge granted the prayers and adjourned the case to 17 December 2018.

On 17 December 2018, nine more suspects were arraigned before the court, rising the number of the suspects to twenty eight. The charges were also amended from two to five, while adding unlawful assembly, hoarding of information and resisting search of the body. The judge granted bail to twenty of the suspects in the sum of ₦1 million each, alongside a surety of the status of a community leader who will swear to an affidavit and identify each of the accused. The judge adjourned the matter to 25 January 2019 to decide the bail application of the remaining eight suspects.

On 20 December 2018, The Muslim Rights Concern, MURIC condemned the bail granted to the twenty suspects, noting it as "a travesty of justice", they further added that the bail "is pregnant with ethnic and religious prejudice", while also calling it "a judicial namby-pamby." On 25 January 2019, the judge said that the ruling for the remaining suspects seeking to be bailed was not ready, noting that he will go through the arguments and be ready with the ruling in February 2019. During the case, the state government made an oral application to amend the charges by reducing the number of suspects from 28 to 24, while noting that the four suspects separated will be charged for illegal possession of firearms in a fresh case. The judge subsequently adjourned the ruling to 13 February 2019.

On 13 February 2019, the judge granted bail to seven of the suspects in the sum of ₦5 million each, alongside a surety who must deposit a certificate of occupancy of landed property within the court's jurisdiction. The judge adjourned the matter to 16 and 18 April 2019. On 18 July 2019, the presiding judge, Daniel Longji recused himself from the case, citing limited time and retirement as reasons. Kyari Gadzama then appeared in the court as head of prosecuting counsel alongside three other counsels and took over from the Plateau state ministry of justice. The judge subsequently referred the case to the chief judge to assign it to another judge. In November 2019, judge of high court 6, Arum Ashom was assigned the case and he subsequently fixed 29 January 2020 for continuation.

On 29 January 2020, the prosecution counsel in the case told the court that a principal suspect who was at large has been arrested, while seeking leave from the court to include the suspect and amend the charges. The prosecution counsel further told the court that he was served application for bail for some of the suspects, while urging the court for more time to go through it and decide if he will oppose it or not. The prosecution counsel also urged the court to adjourn the case to 24 and 25 March 2020 for application for bail, amendment of charges and hearing of the case. The judge adjourned the matter to 24, 25 and 26 March 2020 for all the applications, amended charges and commencement of hearing. Due to the COVID-19 pandemic which resulted in the closure of courts in Nigeria, judges were absent at the state high court on the March 2020 adjourned date and the case was fixed for 26, 27 and 28 April 2020 for continuation of hearing on the matter.
