= Nur Mahmudi Ismail =

Indonesian politician

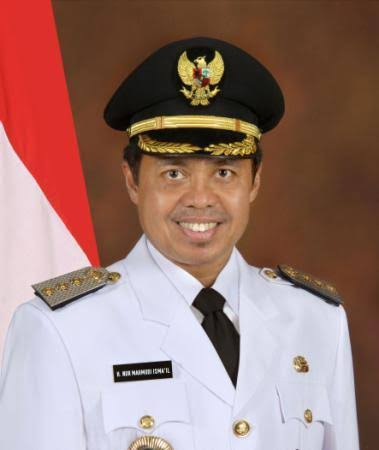

Mayor of Depok
- In office 26 January 2006 – 26 January 2016
- President: Susilo Bambang Yudhoyono; Joko Widodo
- Governor: Danny Setiawan; Ahmad Heryawan
- Lieutenant: Yuyun Wirasaputra; Mohammad Idris
- Preceded by: Badrul Kamal
- Succeeded by: Mohammad Idris

2nd President of Prosperous Justice Party
- In office 9 August 1999 – 16 April 2000
- Preceded by: Didin Hafidhuddin
- Succeeded by: Hidayat Nur Wahid

Personal details
- Born: November 11, 1961 (age 65) Kediri, East Java
- Party: Prosperous Justice Party

Nur Mahmudi Ismail (born November 11, 1961) is an Indonesian former politician who was the mayor of Depok City, a satellite city of West Java located in the southern part of Jakarta. He was born in Kediri.

== Political career ==
Ismail was the first chairman of Prosperous Justice Party (formerly Justice Party) when the party was created in 1998. Later, after the 1999 general election, Ismail resigned from his position as the chairman of the party after being chosen by President Abdurrahman Wahid to serve as the minister of forestry in the National Unity Cabinet. He held this position from 1999 to 2000, when President Wahid replaced him with Marzuki Usman.

== Mayor ==
In 2005, together with his running mate, Yuyun Wirasaputra, Ismail narrowly won the mayoral election, beating the incumbent Badrul Kamal.

Political offices
Preceded by Badrul Kamal	Mayor of Depok, Indonesia; 2006–2016	Succeeded by Mohammad Idris
Preceded by Muslimin Nasution	Minister of Forestry, Indonesia; 1999–2000	Succeeded by Marzuki Usman
Preceded by Position created	Chairman of Justice Party; 1998–2000	Succeeded by Hidayat Nur Wahid (as Chairman of Prosperous Justice Party)
