= Mohammad Idris (Indonesian politician) =

Indonesian politician (born 1961)

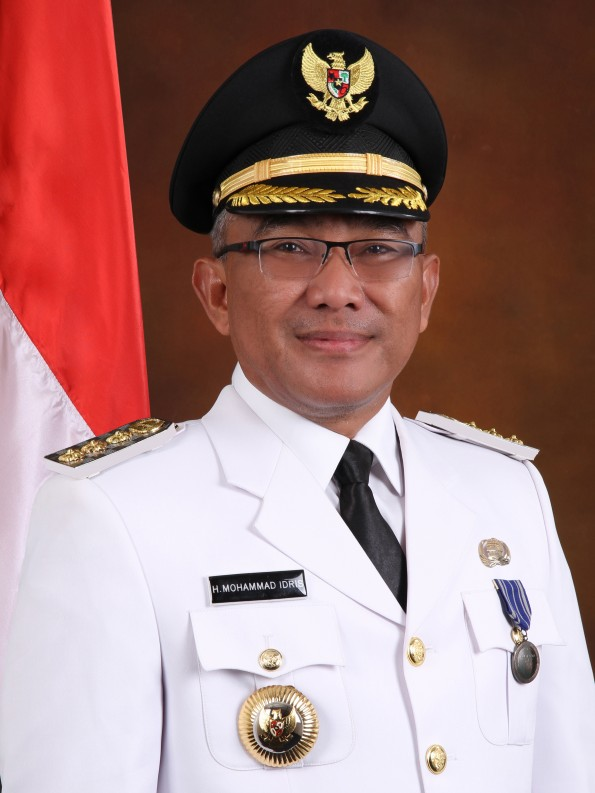

3rd Mayor of Depok
- In office 17 February 2016 – 20 February 2025
- Deputy: Pradi Supriatna (2016–2021); Imam Budi Hartono (2021–2025)
- Preceded by: Nur Mahmudi Ismail
- Succeeded by: Supian Suri

3rd Deputy Mayor of Depok
- In office 26 January 2011 – 16 February 2016
- Preceded by: Yuyun Wirasaputra
- Succeeded by: Pradi Supriatna

Personal details
- Born: 25 July 1961 (age 65) Jakarta, Indonesia
- Party: Independent (2011–2022); PKS (2022–present)
- Spouse: Elly Farida (m. 1988)
- Education: Imam Muhammad ibn Saud Islamic University

Mohammad Idris Abdul Shomad (born 25 July 1961) is an Indonesian politician who served as mayor of Depok from 2016 to 2025. Active in various Islamic organizations in Indonesia, he was first elected in the 2015 local elections and was officially made mayor in 2016. Before becoming mayor, he served as deputy between 2011 and 2016.

== Personal life ==
As a child, he studied in a Muhammadiyah-run primary school, before continuing to a madrasa and later to a pesantren in Ponorogo, East Java. After receiving a scholarship in 1982, he went to Saudi Arabia and obtained his Bachelor's, Master's, and Doctorate degrees after 15 years of Shari'a studies at Imam Muhammad ibn Saud Islamic University, Riyadh.

== Career ==
After returning to Indonesia, he became a lecturer at Syarif Hidayatullah State Islamic University Jakarta, teaching communication science, da'wah, and civilization history. He also acted as a Sharia consultant and taught Islam-related subjects at several other universities, including being a lecturer on Islamic economics at the University of Indonesia between 2002 and 2006.

He also acted as the secretary-general of IKADI (Indonesian Islamic proselytizing organization) between 2005 and 2015, and the chief of the Depok chapter of the Indonesian Ulema Council.

=== City administration ===
In the 2010 local elections, he ran as a deputy mayoral candidate with Nur Mahmudi Ismail, who had been mayor of Depok in the 2006-2011 term as the first directly-elected regional leader in Indonesia. The couple won the election, and during their five-year tenure, the city's government received several awards from the central government on sanitation, health, and child-friendliness.

In the 2015 elections, with Ismail being constitutionally prohibited from getting a third term, Idris ran with Great Indonesia Movement Party politician Pradi Supriatna. The pair secured 411,367 votes (59.4%) and defeated a PDIP-supported pair. He was reelected as mayor in the 2020 election with 415,657 votes (55.5%), defeating Pradi who ran as a mayoral candidate.

Upon his appointment as mayor in 2016, his first officially issued order was to cease issuing permits for new convenience stores (minimarket).

After the conviction of Indonesian national and serial rapist Reynhard Sinaga in the United Kingdom, Idris announced that he planned to raid the local LGBT community in Depok. This announcement was swiftly condemned by human rights activists.
